= Cellular frequencies in the United States =

Cellular frequencies in the United States are allocated by the US Federal Communications Commission. As cellular mobile telephone technology has evolved over time, periodically bands of frequencies are reassigned from other radio services. Companies wishing to provide cellular services in a geographic region compete for the right to license radio spectrum in spectrum auctions. Different cellular companies in the same region may use different levels of cellular technology and different parts of the radio spectrum. In addition to radio frequencies used to connect handsets with cellular base stations, other parts of the radio spectrum are used to interconnect base stations and the wired telephone network. Some frequency bands may be vulnerable to interference by existing services in adjacent frequency bands, such as UHF television broadcasting.

== United States Carrier Bands ==
Legend:	in use	partially in use	not in use

Carrier		AT&T	C Spire	T-Mobile	Verizon
2G GSM (MHz)	PCS (1900)	—N/a	—N/a	Partial	—N/a
4G LTE (MHz)	DD (600) (Note: Band 71)	—N/a	No	Partial	—N/a
4G LTE (MHz)	SMH (700) (Note: Band 12) (Note: Band 13) (Note: Band 14) (Note: Band 17) (Note: Band 29)	Yes	Yes	Yes	Yes
4G LTE (MHz)	CLR (850) (Note: Band 5) (Note: Band 26)	Partial	Yes	Partial	Yes
4G LTE (MHz)	AWS _{(1700}^{2100)} (Note: Band 4) (Note: Band 66) (Note: Band 70)	Yes	Yes	Yes	Yes
4G LTE (MHz)	PCS (1900) (Note: Band 2) (Note: Band 25)	Yes	Yes	Yes	Yes
4G LTE (MHz)	WCS (2300) (Note: Band 30)	Yes	—N/a	—N/a	—N/a
4G LTE (MHz)	BRS / EBS (2500) (Note: Band 41)	—N/a	No	Partial	—N/a
4G LTE (MHz)	CBRS (3500) (Note: Band 48)	Partial	—N/a	Partial	Partial
4G LTE (MHz)	U-NII (5200) (Note: Band 46)	Partial	No	Partial	Partial
5G NR (MHz)	DD (600) (Note: Band n71)	—N/a	Yes	Yes	—N/a
5G NR (MHz)	SMH (700) (Note: Band n12) (Note: Band n13) (Note: Band n14) (Note: Band n29)	No	Yes	No	No
5G NR (MHz)	CLR (850) (Note: Band n5) (Note: Band n26)	Yes	No	No	Yes
5G NR (MHz)	AWS _{(1700}^{2100)} (Note: Band n66) (Note: Band n70)	No	No	No	Yes
5G NR (MHz)	PCS (1900) (Note: Band n2) (Note: Band n25)	Yes	Yes	Yes	Yes
5G NR (MHz)	WCS (2300) (Note: Band n30)	No	—N/a	—N/a	—N/a
5G NR (MHz)	BRS / EBS (2500) (Note: Band n41)	—N/a	Yes	Yes	—N/a
5G NR (MHz)	CBRS (3500) (Note: Band n48)	—N/a	—N/a	—N/a	Partial
5G NR (MHz)	C-Band (3700) (Note: Band n77)	Yes	No	No	Yes
5G NR (MHz)	K-Band (26000) (Note: Band n258)	Partial	No	Partial	No
5G NR (MHz)	Ka-Band (28000) (Note: Band n261)	No	Yes	Partial	Yes
5G NR (MHz)	Ka-Band (39000) (Note: Band n260)	Partial	No	Partial	Yes
5G NR (MHz)	V-Band (47000) (Note: Band n262)	—N/a	—N/a	No	—N/a

== Distribution and regulation ==
The usage of frequencies within the United States is regulated by the Federal Communications Commission (FCC). When distributing initial spectrum licenses in a band the FCC divides the US geographically into a number of areas. A mobile operator (or other interested party) must bid on each area individually. A license owner can use any technology within the licensed area and frequency range subject only to the band rules defining various analog limits. A license owner can also partition the license (split geographically) or disaggregate it (split the whole licensed frequency range into two sub-ranges). Whole, partitioned, and disaggregated licenses can be sold to virtually any other entity.

The Cellular band occupies 824–849 MHz and 869–894 MHz ranges. To issue cellular licenses, the FCC divided the U.S. into 734 geographic markets called Cellular Market Areas (CMAs) and divided the 40 MHz of spectrum into two, 20 MHz amounts referred to as channel blocks; channel block A and channel block B. A single license for the A block and the B block were made available in each market. The B block of spectrum was awarded to a local wireline carrier that provided landline telephone service in the CMA. The A block was awarded to non-wireline carriers. In 1986, the FCC allocated an additional 5 MHz of spectrum for each channel block, raising the total amount of spectrum per block to the current total of 25 MHz. The wireline/non-wireline distinction for Cellular Service licensees no longer exists.

The 1850–1990 MHz PCS band is divided into six frequency blocks (A through F). Each block is between 10 MHz and 30 MHz in bandwidth. License (A or B) is granted for Major Trading Areas (MTAs). License (C to F) is granted for Basic Trading Areas (BTAs). License (G), where issued, is granted for Economic Areas (EAs). There are 51 MTAs, 493 BTAs and 175 EAs in the United States.

- A: 1850–1865 MHz and 1930–1945 MHz (30 MHz)
- B: 1870–1885 MHz and 1950–1965 MHz (30 MHz)
- C: 1895–1910 MHz and 1975–1990 MHz (30 MHz, 15 MHz or 10 MHz)
- D: 1865–1870 MHz and 1945–1950 MHz (10 MHz)
- E: 1885–1890 MHz and 1965–1970 MHz
- F: 1890–1895 MHz and 1970–1975 MHz
- G: 1910–1915 MHz and 1990–1995 MHz

The Advanced Wireless Services (AWS) bands, auctioned in the summer of 2006, were for 1,710–1,755 MHz, and 2,110–2,155 MHz. The spectrum was divided into blocks: A blocks were for Cellular Market Areas, based on existing cellular (1G) licenses, and were 2 × 10 MHz. B and C blocks (2 × 10 MHz and 2 × 5 MHz respectively) were for Basic Economic Areas, larger than CMAs, usually comprising large portions of single states. D, E, and F blocks covered huge areas of the country, typically several states at a time, and covered 2 × 5 MHz for D and E blocks, 2 × 10 MHz for F.

The 700 MHz band was auctioned in early 2008 using spectrum previously used by television stations' analog broadcasts, with Verizon Wireless and AT&T Mobility winning the majority of available spectrum. Qualcomm and Echostar were winners of a significant amount of broadcast-oriented spectrum. Verizon Wireless will use the upper band of the 700 MHz spectrum to deploy their LTE network starting on Dec 5, 2010.

Initially the SMR band could only be used for narrowband wireless technologies such as iDEN technology. In 2004 the FCC developed a new band plan where narrowband operations are provided in 806–816 and 851–861 MHz ranges while wideband operations are allowed in 817–824 MHz and 862–869 MHz separated from narrowband services by a 1 MHz wide guard band. The wideband services part of the SMR band was called ESMR (Enhanced SMR). The new band plan allowed Sprint Corporation to deploy CDMA and LTE technologies on this band. The transition to the new band plan is still ongoing as of August 2016 although it's reaching its final stages.

Citizens Broadband Radio Service (CBRS) is the first shared access band available to the carriers. Unlike other bands listed above carriers do not have to buy exclusive access licenses to use the band. Carriers can acquire optional non-renewable priority access licenses a size of census tract for three years. All network equipment using the band is managed by Spectrum Access System that assigns channels are regulates power levels of the network devices in order to share the spectrum in the most efficient manner. Carriers plan to use the band for indoor small cells in enterprises, hotels, airports, convention centers and stadiums and outdoor small cells serving large campuses, metro areas, downtown areas and suburban areas.

== Interference and limitations ==
- Professional wireless microphones used the 700 MHz band until 2010 when they were made illegal, but equipment still exists in use that may interfere with 3G and 4G technologies.
- Due to immediate adjacency to channel 51 lower 700 MHz A block license holders were prohibited to use it within channel 51 station service areas. Initially almost one third of US population was in the channel 51 exclusion zones. As of August 2016 T-Mobile US has cleared almost all exclusion zones by either subsidizing relocation of channel 51 stations or by obtaining a permission to use 700 A block while the stations still operate on channel 51.

== See also ==
Detailed lists:

- Networks by technology:
  - List of UMTS networks
  - List of LTE networks
  - List of 5G NR networks
  - List of CDMA2000 networks
- Bands by technology:
  - GSM frequency bands
  - UMTS frequency bands
  - LTE frequency bands
  - 5G NR frequency bands
  - CDMA frequency bands

Other articles:

- Comparison of mobile phone standards
- 3GPP
- Roaming
- Dual-band
- Tri-band
- Quad-band
- 700 MHz wireless spectrum auction
- Microwave
- 4G
- 3GPP Long Term Evolution (LTE)
- Title 47 of the Code of Federal Regulations
- List of United States wireless communications service providers
