= Cellular network =

Telecommunications networks transmitted by radio waves

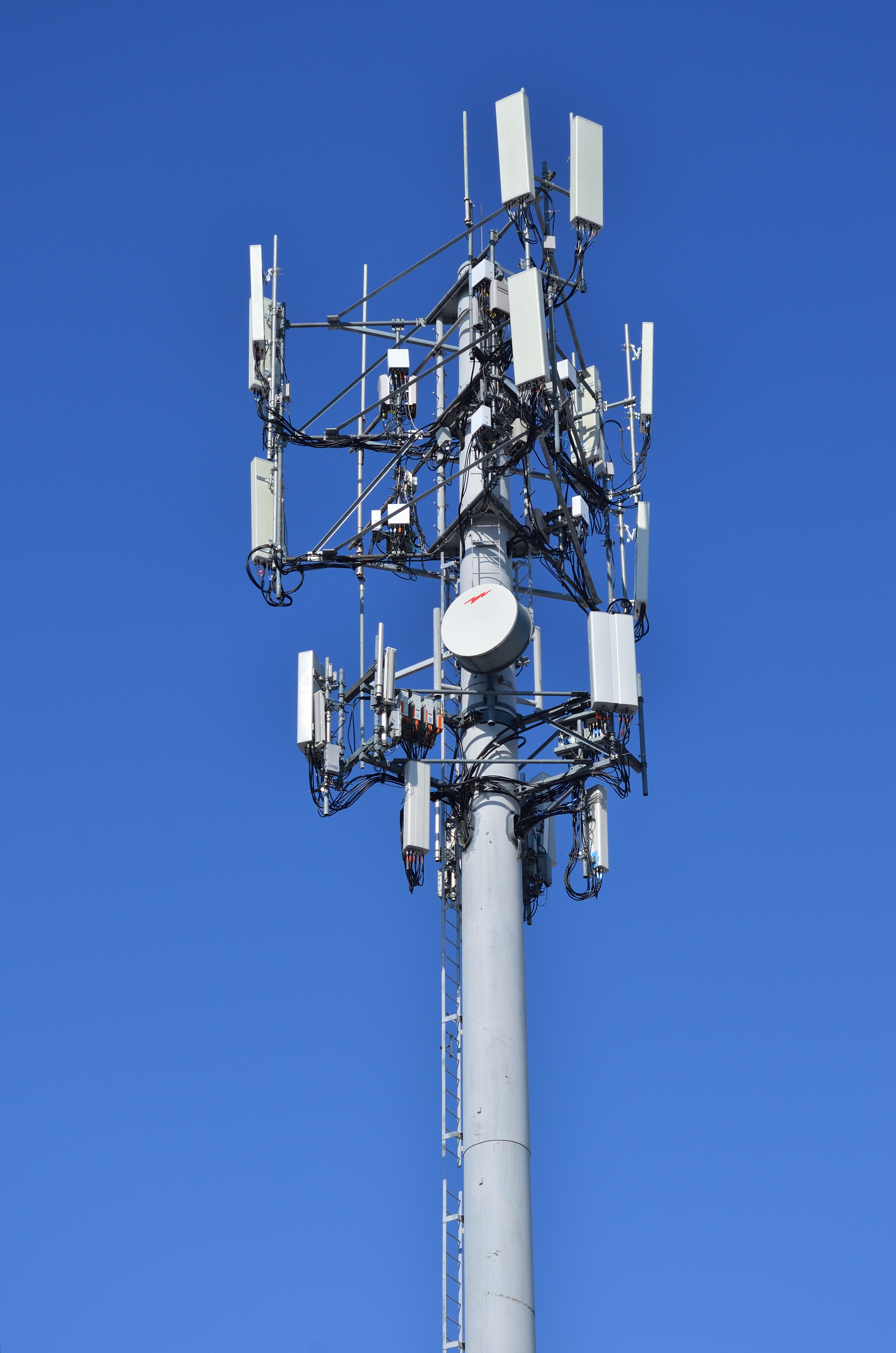
Top of a cellular radio tower

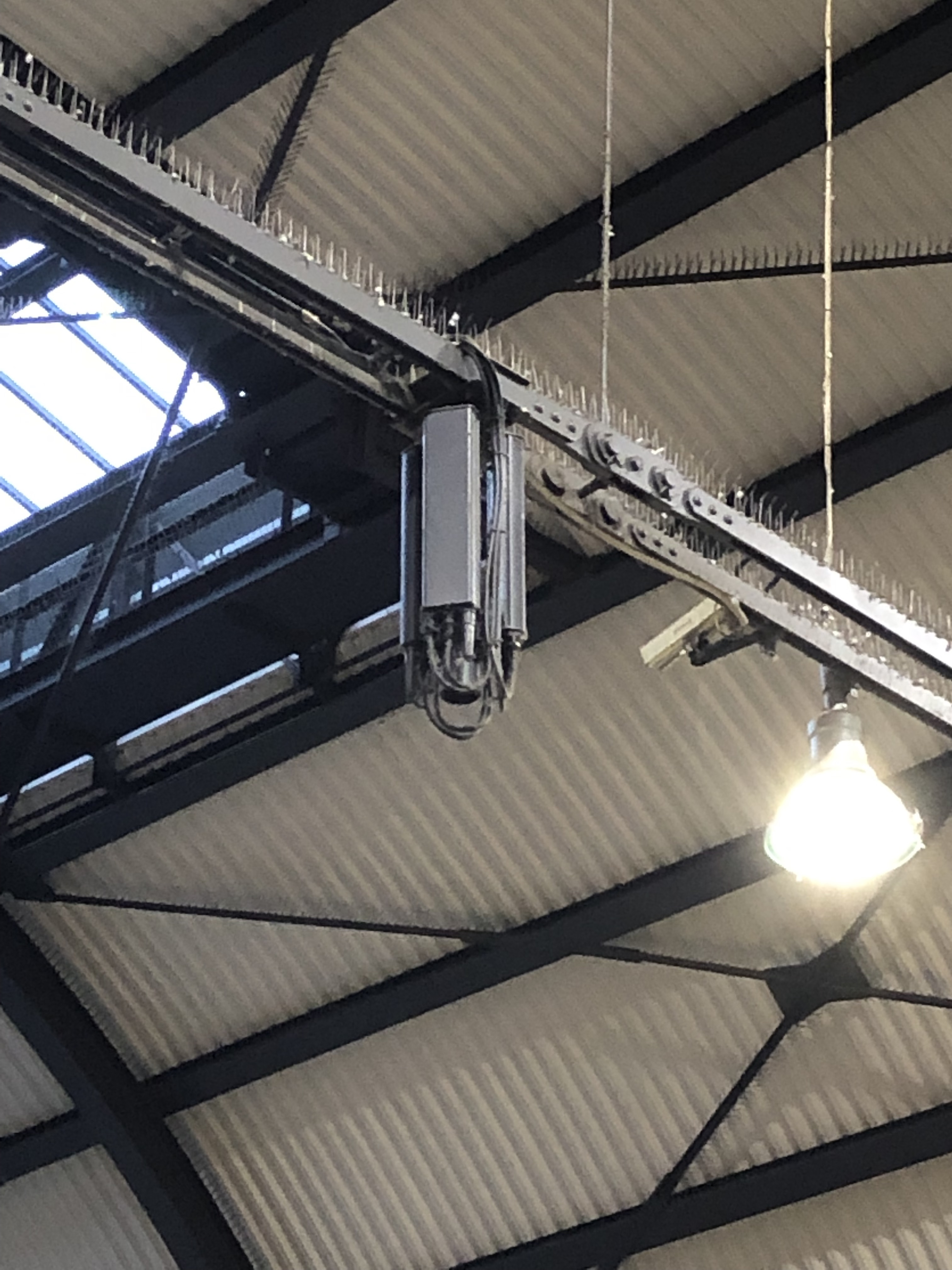
Indoor cell site in Germany

A cellular network or mobile network (sometimes known as cellular communication network or mobile communication network) is a telecommunications network where the link to and from end nodes is wireless and the network is distributed over land areas called cells, each served by at least one fixed-location transceiver (such as a base station). These base stations provide the cell with the network coverage which can be used for transmission of voice, data, and other types of content via radio waves. Each cell's coverage area is determined by factors such as the power of the transceiver, the terrain, and the frequency band being used. A cell typically uses a different set of frequencies from neighboring cells, to avoid interference and provide guaranteed service quality within each cell.

When joined, these cells provide radio coverage over a wide geographic area. This enables numerous devices, such as mobile phones, tablets, laptops equipped with mobile broadband modems, and wearable devices such as smartwatches, to communicate with each other and with fixed transceivers and telephones anywhere in the network, via base stations, even if some of the devices are moving through more than one cell during transmission. The design of cellular networks allows for seamless handover, enabling uninterrupted communication when a device moves from one cell to another.

Modern cellular networks utilize advanced technologies such as Multiple Input Multiple Output (MIMO), beamforming, and small cells to enhance network capacity and efficiency.

Cellular networks can offer a number of desirable features:

- More capacity than a single large transmitter, since the same frequency can be used for multiple links as long as they are in different cells
- Mobile devices use less power than a single transmitter or satellite since the cell towers are closer
- Larger coverage area than a single terrestrial transmitter, since additional cell towers can be added indefinitely and are not limited by the horizon
- Capability of utilizing higher frequency signals (and thus more available bandwidth / faster data rates) that are not able to propagate at long distances
- With data compression and multiplexing, several video (including digital video) and audio channels may travel through a higher frequency signal on a single wideband carrier

Major telecommunications providers have deployed voice and data cellular networks over most of the inhabited land area of Earth. This allows mobile phones and other devices to be connected to the public switched telephone network and public Internet access. In addition to traditional voice and data services, cellular networks now support internet of things (IoT) applications, connecting devices such as smart meters, vehicles, and industrial sensors.

The evolution of cellular networks from 1G to 5G has progressively introduced faster speeds, lower latency, and support for a larger number of devices, enabling advanced applications in fields such as healthcare, transportation, and smart cities.

Private cellular networks can be used for research or for large organizations and fleets, such as dispatch for local public safety agencies or a taxicab company, as well as for local wireless communications in enterprise and industrial settings such as factories, warehouses, mines, power plants, substations, oil and gas facilities and ports.

== Concept ==
Example of frequency reuse factor or pattern, with four frequencies (F1-F4)

In a cellular radio system, a land area to be supplied with radio service is divided into cells in a pattern dependent on terrain and reception characteristics. These cell patterns roughly take the form of regular shapes, such as hexagons, squares, or circles although hexagonal cells are conventional. Each of these cells is assigned with multiple frequencies (f_{1} – f_{6}) which have corresponding radio base stations. The group of frequencies can be reused in other cells, provided that the same frequencies are not reused in adjacent cells, which would cause co-channel interference.

The increased capacity in a cellular network, compared with a network with a single transmitter, comes from the mobile communication switching system developed by Amos Joel of Bell Labs that permitted multiple callers in a given area to use the same frequency by switching calls to the nearest available cellular tower having that frequency available. This strategy is viable because a given radio frequency can be reused in a different area for an unrelated transmission. In contrast, a single transmitter can only handle one transmission for a given frequency. Inevitably, there is some level of interference from the signal from the other cells which use the same frequency. Consequently, there must be at least one cell gap between cells which reuse the same frequency in a standard frequency-division multiple access (FDMA) system.

Consider the case of a taxi company, where each radio has a manually operated channel selector knob to tune to different frequencies. As drivers move around, they change from channel to channel. The drivers are aware of which frequency approximately covers some area. When they do not receive a signal from the transmitter, they try other channels until finding one that works. The taxi drivers only speak one at a time when invited by the base station operator. This is a form of time-division multiple access (TDMA).

== Orbital Cellular ==
Orbital cellular networks, also known as Direct-to-Cell satellite networks (D2C), Direct-to-Device networks, Satellite-to- Smartphone and Non-Terrestrial Networks (NTN) represent an evolution in mobile telephony where standard terrestrial cellular frequencies are broadcast directly from low Earth orbit (LEO) satellites to unmodified consumer smartphones. Unlike traditional satellite phones that require proprietary hardware and bulky antennas, these space-based networks use advanced phased array antennas to project highly precise, moving cell coverage sectors onto the Earth's surface. These satellite-based cells seamlessly interoperate with ground-based networks by utilizing roaming partnerships and existing mobile network operator (MNO) spectrum. The primary objective of orbital cellular networks is to eliminate rural coverage gaps, provide critical emergency communication infrastructure in disaster-stricken zones, and establish a foundational layer for global Internet of Things (IoT) connectivity across remote land masses and oceans where building terrestrial masts is economically or logistically unfeasible.

== History ==
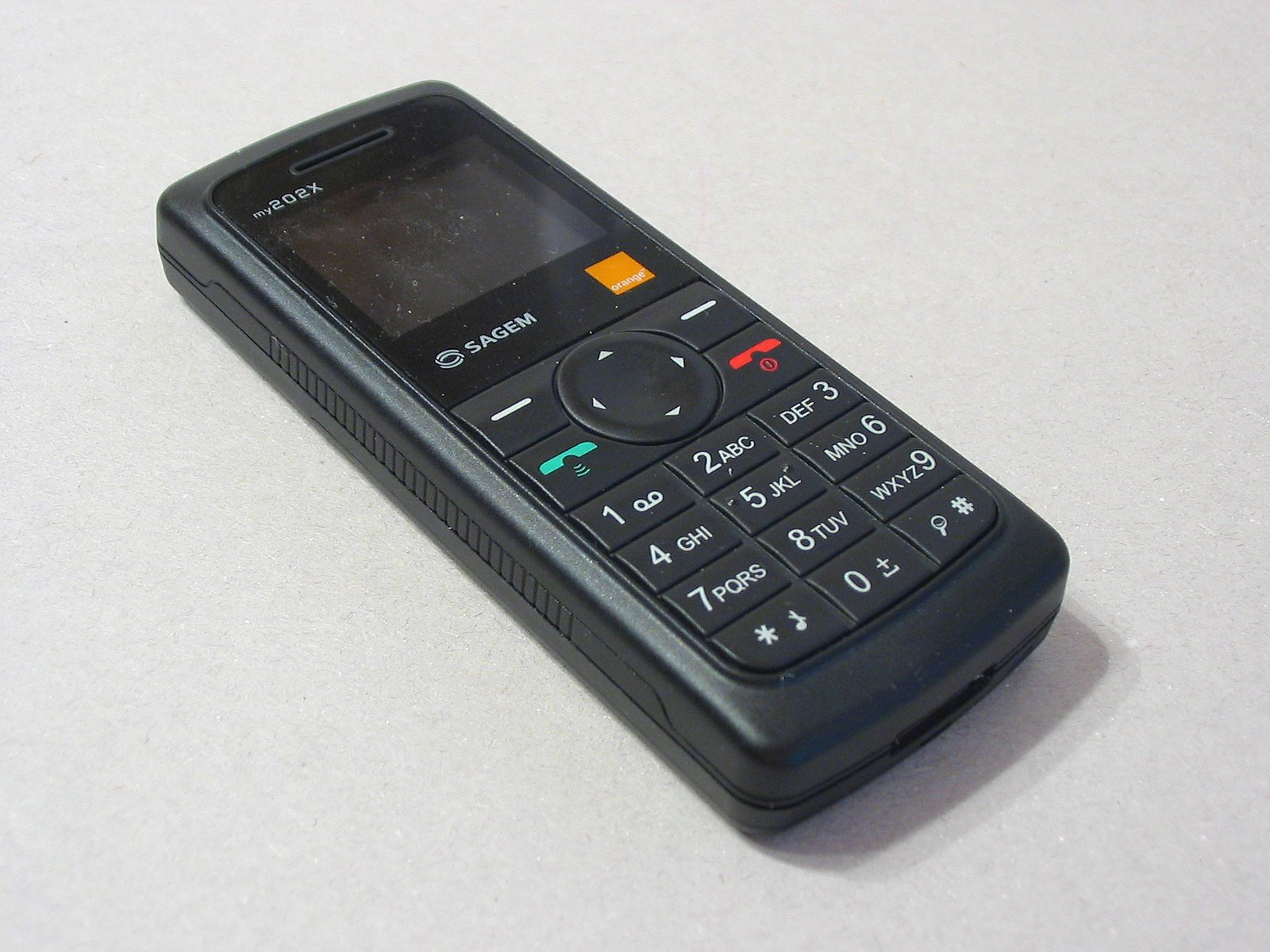
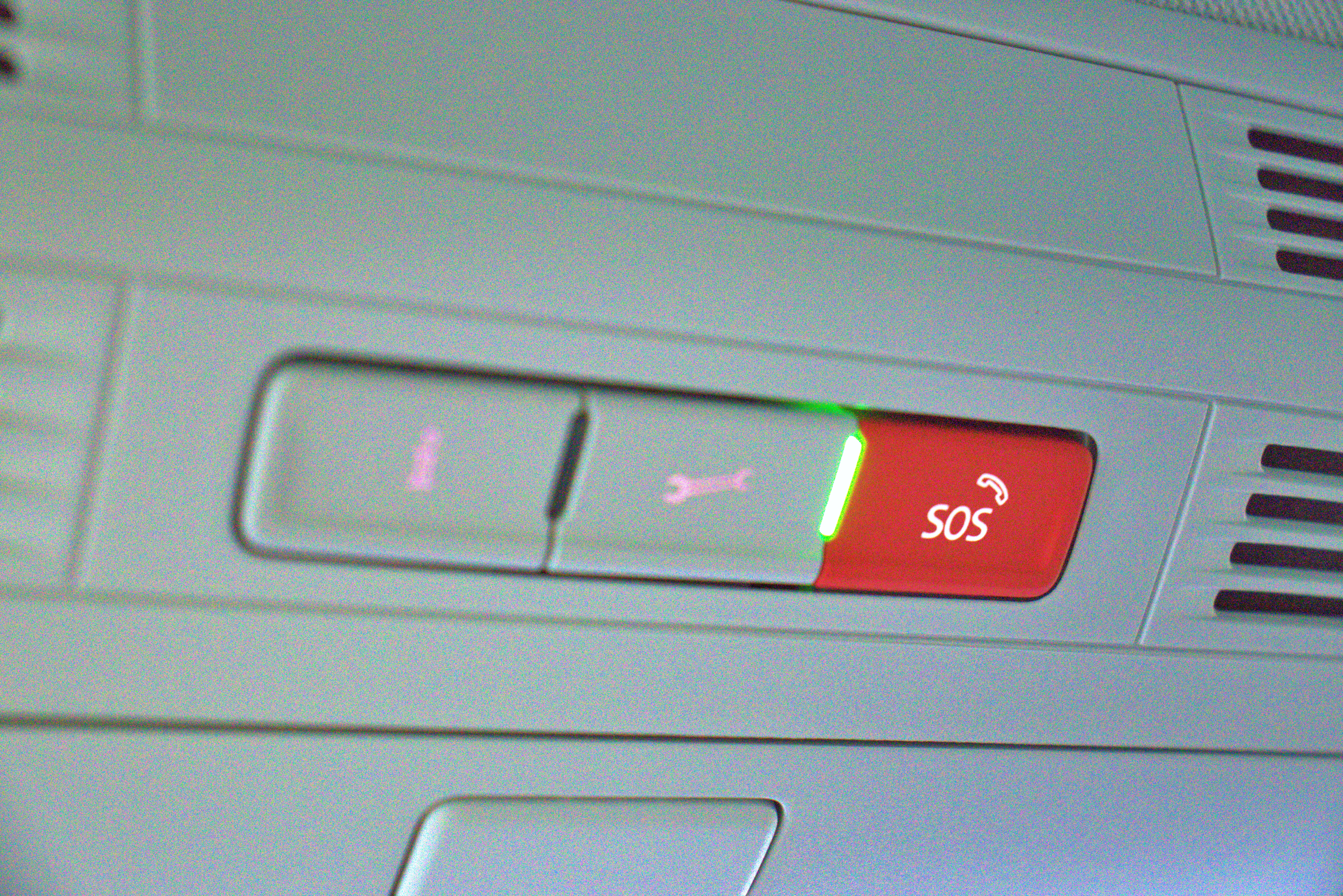
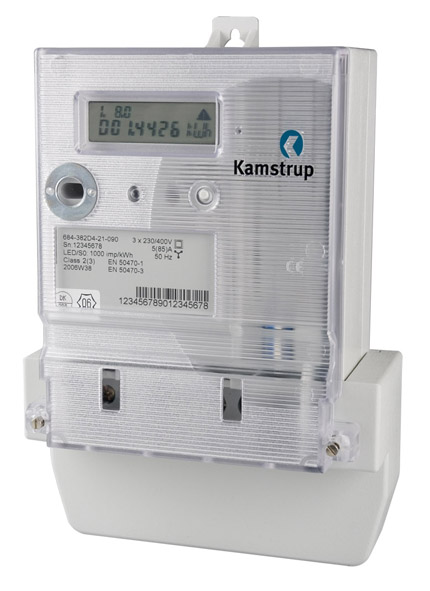
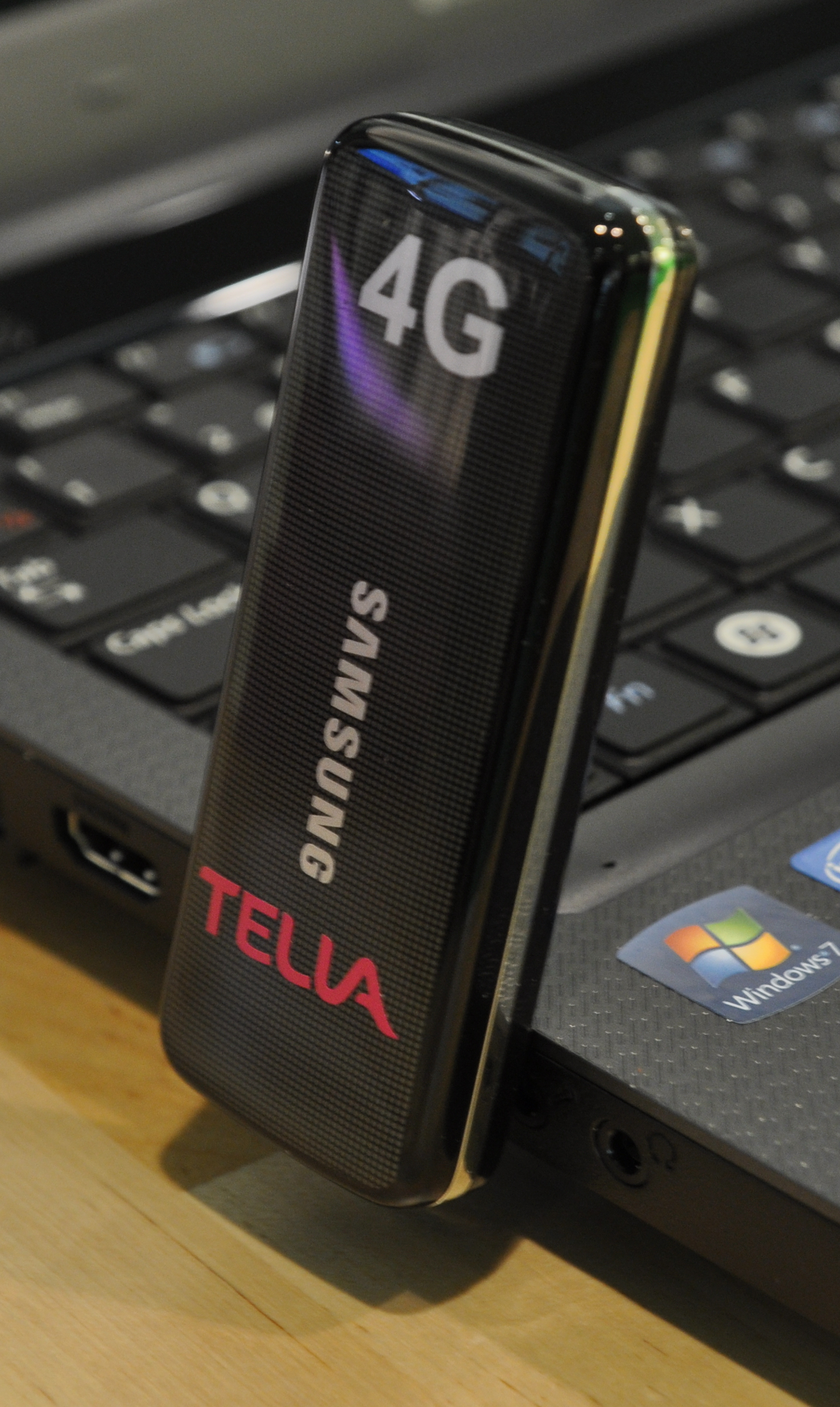
Examples of modern devices that may use cellular networks: a mobile phone (top-left), an emergency/panic button in a car (top-right), an electricity smart meter (bottom-left) and a mobile broadband USB modem attached to a laptop (bottom-right)

The idea to establish a standard cellular phone network was first proposed on December 11, 1947. This proposal was put forward by Douglas H. Ring, a Bell Labs engineer, in an internal memo suggesting the development of a cellular telephone system by AT&T.

The first commercial cellular network, the 1G generation, was launched in Japan by Nippon Telegraph and Telephone (NTT) in 1979, initially in the metropolitan area of Tokyo. However, NTT did not initially commercialize the system; the early launch was motivated by an effort to understand a practical cellular system rather than by an interest to profit from it. In 1981, the Nordic Mobile Telephone system was created as the first network to cover an entire country. The network was released in 1981 in Sweden and Norway, then in Finland and Denmark in early 1982. Televerket, a state-owned corporation responsible for telecommunications in Sweden, launched the system.

In September 1981, Jan Stenbeck, a financier and businessman, launched Comvik, a Swedish telecommunications company. Comvik was the first European telecommunications firm to challenge the state's telephone monopoly on the industry. According to sources, Comvik was the first to launch a commercial automatic cellular system before Televerket launched its own in October 1981. However, at the time of the new network's release, the Swedish Post and Telecom Authority threatened to shut down the system after claiming that the company had used an unlicensed automatic gear that could interfere with its own networks. In December 1981, Sweden awarded Comvik with a license to operate its own automatic cellular network in the spirit of market competition.

The Bell System had developed cellular technology since 1947, and had cellular networks in operation in Chicago, Illinois, and Dallas, Texas, prior to 1979; however, regulatory battles delayed AT&T's deployment of cellular service to 1983, when its Regional Holding Company Illinois Bell first provided cellular service.

First-generation cellular network technology continued to expand its reach to the rest of the world. In 1990, Millicom Inc., a telecommunications service provider, strategically partnered with Comvik's international cellular operations to become Millicom International Cellular SA. The company went on to establish a 1G systems foothold in Ghana, Africa under the brand name Mobitel. In 2006, the company's Ghana operations were renamed to Tigo.

The wireless revolution began in the early 1990s, leading to the transition from analog to digital networks. The MOSFET invented at Bell Labs between 1955 and 1960, was adapted for cellular networks by the early 1990s, with the wide adoption of power MOSFET, LDMOS (RF amplifier), and RF CMOS (RF circuit) devices leading to the development and proliferation of digital wireless mobile networks.

The first commercial digital cellular network, the 2G generation, was launched in 1991. This sparked competition in the sector as the new operators challenged the incumbent 1G analog network operators.

== Cell signal encoding ==
To distinguish signals from several different transmitters, a number of channel access methods have been developed, including frequency-division multiple access (FDMA, used by analog and D-AMPS systems), time-division multiple access (TDMA, used by GSM) and code-division multiple access (CDMA, first used for PCS, and the basis of 3G).

With FDMA, the transmitting and receiving frequencies used by different users in each cell are different from each other. Each cellular call was assigned a pair of frequencies (one for base to mobile, the other for mobile to base) to provide full-duplex operation. The original AMPS systems had 666 channel pairs, 333 each for the CLEC "A" system and ILEC "B" system. The number of channels was expanded to 416 pairs per carrier, but ultimately the number of RF channels limits the number of calls that a cell site could handle. FDMA is a familiar technology to telephone companies, which used frequency-division multiplexing to add channels to their point-to-point wireline plants before time-division multiplexing rendered FDM obsolete.

With TDMA, the transmitting and receiving time slots used by different users in each cell are different from each other. TDMA typically uses digital signaling to store and forward bursts of voice data that are fit into time slices for transmission, and expanded at the receiving end to produce a somewhat normal-sounding voice at the receiver. TDMA must introduce latency (time delay) into the audio signal. As long as the latency time is short enough that the delayed audio is not heard as an echo, it is not problematic. TDMA is a familiar technology for telephone companies, which used time-division multiplexing to add channels to their point-to-point wireline plants before packet switching rendered TDM obsolete.

The principle of CDMA is based on spread spectrum technology developed for military use during World War II and improved during the Cold War into direct-sequence spread spectrum that was used for early CDMA cellular systems and Wi-Fi. DSSS allows multiple simultaneous phone conversations to take place on a single wideband RF channel, without needing to channelize them in time or frequency. Although more sophisticated than older multiple access schemes (and unfamiliar to legacy telephone companies because it was not developed by Bell Labs), CDMA has scaled well to become the basis for 3G cellular radio systems.

Other available methods of multiplexing such as MIMO, a more sophisticated version of antenna diversity, combined with active beamforming provides much greater spatial multiplexing ability compared to original AMPS cells, that typically only addressed one to three unique spaces. Massive MIMO deployment allows much greater channel reuse, thus increasing the number of subscribers per cell site, greater data throughput per user, or some combination thereof. Quadrature Amplitude Modulation (QAM) modems offer an increasing number of bits per symbol, allowing more users per megahertz of bandwidth (and decibels of SNR), greater data throughput per user, or some combination thereof.

== Frequency reuse ==
The key characteristic of a cellular network is the ability to reuse frequencies to increase both coverage and capacity. As described above, adjacent cells must use different frequencies, however, there is no problem with two cells sufficiently far apart operating on the same frequency, provided the masts and cellular network users' equipment do not transmit with too much power.

The elements that determine frequency reuse are the reuse distance and the reuse factor. The reuse distance, D is calculated as

$$D=R\sqrt{3N}$$,

where R is the cell radius and N is the number of cells per cluster. Cells may vary in radius from 1 to 30 kilometres (0.62 to 18.64 mi). The boundaries of the cells can also overlap between adjacent cells and large cells can be divided into smaller cells.

The frequency reuse factor is the rate at which the same frequency can be used in the network. It is 1/K (or K according to some books) where K is the number of cells which cannot use the same frequencies for transmission. Common values for the frequency reuse factor are 1/3, 1/4, 1/7, 1/9 and 1/12 (or 3, 4, 7, 9 and 12, depending on notation).

In case of N sector antennas on the same base station site, each with different direction, the base station site can serve N different sectors. N is typically 3. A reuse pattern of N/K denotes a further division in frequency among N sector antennas per site. Some current and historical reuse patterns are 3/7 (North American AMPS), 6/4 (Motorola NAMPS), and 3/4 (GSM).

If the total available bandwidth is B, each cell can only use a number of frequency channels corresponding to a bandwidth of B/K, and each sector can use a bandwidth of B/NK.

Code-division multiple access-based systems use a wider frequency band to achieve the same rate of transmission as FDMA, but this is compensated for by the ability to use a frequency reuse factor of 1, for example using a reuse pattern of 1/1. In other words, adjacent base station sites use the same frequencies, and the different base stations and users are separated by codes rather than frequencies. While N is shown as 1 in this example, that does not mean the CDMA cell has only one sector, but rather that the entire cell bandwidth is also available to each sector individually.

Recently also orthogonal frequency-division multiple access based systems such as LTE are being deployed with a frequency reuse of 1. Since such systems do not spread the signal across the frequency band, inter-cell radio resource management is important to coordinate resource allocation between different cell sites and to limit the inter-cell interference. There are various means of inter-cell interference coordination (ICIC) already defined in the standard. Coordinated scheduling, multi-site MIMO or multi-site beamforming are other examples for inter-cell radio resource management that might be standardized in the future.

== Directional antennas ==
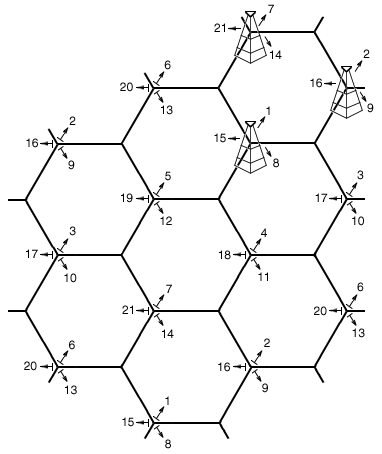
Cellular telephone frequency reuse pattern. See U.S. patent 4,144,411

Cell towers frequently use a directional signal to improve reception in higher-traffic areas. In the United States, the Federal Communications Commission (FCC) limits omnidirectional cell tower signals to 100 watts of power. If the tower has directional antennas, the FCC allows the cell operator to emit up to 500 watts of effective radiated power (ERP).

Although the original cell towers created an even, omnidirectional signal, were at the centers of the cells and were omnidirectional, a cellular map can be redrawn with the cellular telephone towers located at the corners of the hexagons where three cells converge. Each tower has three sets of directional antennas aimed in three different directions with 120 degrees for each cell (totaling 360 degrees) and receiving/transmitting into three different cells at different frequencies. This provides a minimum of three channels, and three towers for each cell and greatly increases the chances of receiving a usable signal from at least one direction.

The numbers in the illustration are channel numbers, which repeat every 3 cells. Large cells can be subdivided into smaller cells for high volume areas.

Cell phone companies also use this directional signal to improve reception along highways and inside buildings like stadiums and arenas.

== Broadcast messages and paging ==
Practically every cellular system has some kind of broadcast mechanism. This can be used directly for distributing information to multiple mobiles. Commonly, for example in mobile telephony systems, the most important use of broadcast information is to set up channels for one-to-one communication between the mobile transceiver and the base station. This is called paging. The three different paging procedures generally adopted are sequential, parallel and selective paging.

The details of the process of paging vary somewhat from network to network, but normally we know a limited number of cells where the phone is located (this group of cells is called a Location Area in the GSM or UMTS system, or Routing Area if a data packet session is involved; in LTE, cells are grouped into Tracking Areas). Paging takes place by sending the broadcast message to all of those cells. Paging messages can be used for information transfer. This happens in pagers, in CDMA systems for sending SMS messages, and in the UMTS system where it allows for low downlink latency in packet-based connections.

In LTE/4G, the Paging procedure is initiated by the MME when data packets need to be delivered to the UE.

Paging types supported by the MME are:

- Basic.
- SGs_CS and SGs_PS.
- QCI_1 through QCI_9.

== Movement from cell to cell and handing over ==
In a primitive taxi system, when the taxi moved away from a first tower and closer to a second tower, the taxi driver manually switched from one frequency to another as needed. If communication was interrupted due to a loss of a signal, the taxi driver asked the base station operator to repeat the message on a different frequency.

In a cellular system, as the distributed mobile transceivers move from cell to cell during an ongoing continuous communication, switching from one cell frequency to a different cell frequency is done electronically without interruption and without a base station operator or manual switching. This is called the handover or handoff. Typically, a new channel is automatically selected for the mobile unit on the new base station which will serve it. The mobile unit then automatically switches from the current channel to the new channel and communication continues.

The exact details of the mobile system's move from one base station to the other vary considerably from system to system (see the example below for how a mobile phone network manages handover).

== Mobile phone network ==
WCDMA network architecture

The most common example of a cellular network is a mobile phone (cell phone) network. A mobile phone is a portable telephone which receives or makes calls through a cell site (base station) or transmitting tower. Radio waves are used to transfer signals to and from the cell phone.

Modern mobile phone networks use cells because radio frequencies are a limited, shared resource. Cell-sites and handsets change frequency under computer control and use low power transmitters so that the usually limited number of radio frequencies can be simultaneously used by many callers with less interference.

A cellular network is used by the mobile phone operator to achieve both coverage and capacity for their subscribers. Large geographic areas are split into smaller cells to avoid line-of-sight signal loss and to support a large number of active phones in that area. All of the cell sites are connected to telephone exchanges (or switches), which in turn connect to the public telephone network.

In cities, each cell site may have a range of up to approximately 1/2 mile (0.80 km), while in rural areas, the range could be as much as 5 miles (8.0 km). It is possible that in clear open areas, a user may receive signals from a cell site 25 miles (40 km) away. In rural areas with low-band coverage and tall towers, basic voice and messaging service may reach 50 miles (80 km), with limitations on bandwidth and number of simultaneous calls.

Since almost all mobile phones use cellular technology, including GSM, CDMA, and AMPS (analog), the term "cell phone" is in some regions, notably the US, used interchangeably with "mobile phone". However, satellite phones are mobile phones that do not communicate directly with a ground-based cellular tower but may do so indirectly by way of a satellite.

There are a number of different digital cellular technologies, including: Global System for Mobile Communications (GSM), General Packet Radio Service (GPRS), cdmaOne, CDMA2000, Evolution-Data Optimized (EV-DO), Enhanced Data Rates for GSM Evolution (EDGE), Universal Mobile Telecommunications System (UMTS), Digital Enhanced Cordless Telecommunications (DECT), Digital AMPS (IS-136/TDMA), and Integrated Digital Enhanced Network (iDEN). The transition from existing analog to the digital standard followed a very different path in Europe and the US. As a consequence, multiple digital standards surfaced in the US, while Europe and many countries converged towards the GSM standard.

=== Structure of the mobile phone cellular network ===
A simple view of the cellular mobile-radio network consists of the following:

- A network of radio base stations forming the base station subsystem.
- The core circuit switched network for handling voice calls and text
- A packet switched network for handling mobile data
- The public switched telephone network to connect subscribers to the wider telephony network

This network is the foundation of the GSM system network. There are many functions that are performed by this network in order to make sure customers get the desired service including mobility management, registration, call set-up, and handover.

Any phone connects to the network via an RBS (Radio Base Station) at a corner of the corresponding cell which in turn connects to the Mobile switching center (MSC). The MSC provides a connection to the public switched telephone network (PSTN). The link from a phone to the RBS is called an uplink while the other way is termed downlink.

Radio channels effectively use the transmission medium through the use of the following multiplexing and access schemes: frequency-division multiple access (FDMA), time-division multiple access (TDMA), code-division multiple access (CDMA), and space-division multiple access (SDMA).

=== Small cells ===
Small cells, which have a smaller coverage area than base stations, are categorised as follows:

- Microcell -> less than 2 kilometres,
- Picocell -> less than 200 metres,
- Femtocell -> around 10 metres,
- Attocell -> 1–4 metres

=== Cellular handover in mobile phone networks ===
As the phone user moves from one cell area to another cell while a call is in progress, the mobile station will search for a new channel to attach to in order not to drop the call. Once a new channel is found, the network will command the mobile unit to switch to the new channel and at the same time switch the call onto the new channel.

With CDMA, multiple CDMA handsets share a specific radio channel. The signals are separated by using a pseudonoise code (PN code) that is specific to each phone. As the user moves from one cell to another, the handset sets up radio links with multiple cell sites (or sectors of the same site) simultaneously. This is known as "soft handoff" because, unlike with traditional cellular technology, there is no one defined point where the phone switches to the new cell.

In IS-95 inter-frequency handovers and older analog systems such as NMT it will typically be impossible to test the target channel directly while communicating. In this case, other techniques have to be used such as pilot beacons in IS-95. This means that there is almost always a brief break in the communication while searching for the new channel followed by the risk of an unexpected return to the old channel.

If there is no ongoing communication or the communication can be interrupted, it is possible for the mobile unit to spontaneously move from one cell to another and then notify the base station with the strongest signal.

=== Cellular frequency choice in mobile phone networks ===
The effect of frequency on cell coverage means that different frequencies serve better for different uses. Low frequencies, such as 450 MHz NMT, serve very well for countryside coverage. GSM 900 (900 MHz) is suitable for light urban coverage. GSM 1800 (1.8 GHz) starts to be limited by structural walls. UMTS, at 2.1 GHz is quite similar in coverage to GSM 1800.

Higher frequencies are a disadvantage when it comes to coverage, but it is a decided advantage when it comes to capacity. Picocells, covering e.g. one floor of a building, become possible, and the same frequency can be used for cells which are practically neighbors.

Cell service area may also vary due to interference from transmitting systems, both within and around that cell. This is true especially in CDMA based systems. The receiver requires a certain signal-to-noise ratio, and the transmitter should not send with too high transmission power in view to not cause interference with other transmitters. As the receiver moves away from the transmitter, the power received decreases, so the power control algorithm of the transmitter increases the power it transmits to restore the level of received power. As the interference (noise) rises above the received power from the transmitter, and the power of the transmitter cannot be increased anymore, the signal becomes corrupted and eventually unusable. In CDMA-based systems, the effect of interference from other mobile transmitters in the same cell on coverage area is very marked and has a special name, cell breathing.

One can see examples of cell coverage by studying some of the coverage maps provided by real operators on their web sites or by looking at independently crowdsourced maps such as Opensignal or CellMapper. In certain cases they may mark the site of the transmitter; in others, it can be calculated by working out the point of strongest coverage.

A cellular repeater is used to extend cell coverage into larger areas. They range from wideband repeaters for consumer use in homes and offices to smart or digital repeaters for industrial needs.

=== Cell size ===
The following table shows the dependency of the coverage area of one cell on the frequency of a CDMA2000 network:

| Frequency (MHz) | Cell radius (km) | Cell area (km^{2}) | Relative cell count |
|---|---|---|---|
| 450 | 48.9 | 7521 | 1 |
| 950 | 26.9 | 2269 | 3.3 |
| 1800 | 14.0 | 618 | 12.2 |
| 2100 | 12.0 | 449 | 16.2 |

== See also ==
Cellular network standards and generation timeline.

Lists and technical information:

- Mobile technologies
  - 2G networks (the first digital networks, 1G and 0G were analog):
    - GSM
      - Circuit Switched Data (CSD)
      - GPRS
      - EDGE(IMT-SC)
      - Evolved EDGE
    - Digital AMPS
      - Cellular Digital Packet Data (CDPD)
    - cdmaOne (IS-95)
      - Circuit Switched Data (CSD)
    - Personal Handy-phone System (PHS)
    - Personal Digital Cellular
  - 3G networks:
    - UMTS
      - W-CDMA (air interface)
      - TD-CDMA (air interface)
      - TD-SCDMA (air interface)
        - HSPA
        - HSDPA
        - HSPA+
    - CDMA2000
      - OFDMA (air interface)
        - EVDO
          - SVDO
  - 4G networks:
    - IMT Advanced
    - LTE (TD-LTE)
      - LTE Advanced
      - LTE Advanced Pro
    - WiMAX
      - WiMAX-Advanced (WirelessMAN-Advanced)
    - Ultra Mobile Broadband (never commercialized)
    - MBWA (IEEE 802.20, Mobile Broadband Wireless Access, HC-SDMA, iBurst, has been shut down)
  - 5G networks:
    - 5G NR
      - 5G-Advanced

Starting with EVDO the following techniques can also be used to improve performance:

- MIMO, SDMA and Beamforming
- Cellular frequencies
  - CDMA frequency bands
  - GSM frequency bands
  - UMTS frequency bands
  - LTE frequency bands
  - 5G NR frequency bands
- Deployed networks by technology
  - List of UMTS networks
  - List of CDMA2000 networks
  - List of LTE networks
  - List of deployed WiMAX networks
  - List of 5G NR networks
- Deployed networks by country (including technology and frequencies)
  - List of mobile network operators of Europe
  - List of mobile network operators of the Americas
  - List of mobile network operators of the Asia Pacific region
  - List of mobile network operators of the Middle East and Africa
  - List of mobile network operators (summary)
- Mobile country code - code, frequency, and technology for each operator in each country
- Comparison of mobile phone standards
- List of mobile phone brands by country (manufacturers)

Equipment:

- Cellular repeater
- Cellular router
- Professional mobile radio (PMR)
- OpenBTS
- Remote radio head
- Baseband unit
- Radio access network
- Mobile cell sites

Other:

- Antenna diversity
- Cellular traffic
- MIMO (multiple-input and multiple-output)
- Mobile edge computing
- Mobile phone radiation and health
- Network simulation
- Personal Communications Service
- Radio resource management (RRM)
- Routing in cellular networks
- Signal strength
- Title 47 of the Code of Federal Regulations
