= Personal Communications Service =

Type of cellular mobile phone service

A personal communications service (PCS) is set of communications capabilities that provide a combination of terminal mobility, personal mobility, and service profile management. This class of services comprises several types of wireless voice or wireless data communications systems, typically incorporating digital technology, providing services similar to advanced cellular mobile or paging services. In addition, PCS can also be used to provide other wireless communications services, including services that allow people to place and receive communications while away from their home or office, as well as wireless communications to homes, office buildings and other fixed locations. Described in more commercial terms, PCS is a generation of wireless cellular-phone technology, that combines a range of features and services surpassing those available in analogue- and first-generation (2G) digital-cellular phone systems, providing a user with an all-in-one wireless phone, paging, messaging, and data service.

The International Telecommunication Union (ITU) describes personal communications services as a component of the IMT-2000 (3G) standard. PCS and the IMT-2000 standard of which PCS is a part do not specify a particular air interface and channel access method. Wireless service providers may deploy equipment using any of several air interface and channel access methods, as long as the network meets the service description for technical characteristics described in the standard.

In ITU Region 2, PCS are provided in the '1900 MHz' band (specifically 1850–1995 MHz). This frequency band was designated by the United States Federal Communications Commission (FCC) and Industry Canada to be used for new wireless services to alleviate capacity caps inherent in the original Advanced Mobile Phone System (AMPS) and Digital AMPS (D-AMPS) cellular networks in the '850 MHz' band (specifically 814–894 MHz). Only Region 2 has a PCS band.

== PCS network in the United States ==
In the United States, Sprint PCS was the first company to build and operate a PCS network, launching service in November 1995 under the Sprint Spectrum brand in the Baltimore-Washington metropolitan area. Sprint originally built the network using GSM radio interface equipment. Sprint PCS later selected CDMA as the radio interface for its nationwide network, and built a parallel CDMA network in the Baltimore-Washington area, launching service in 1997. Sprint operated the two networks in parallel until finishing a migration of its area customers to the CDMA network.

After completing the customer migration in 1999, Sprint PCS sold the GSM radio interface network equipment to Omnipoint Communications in January 2000. Omnipoint was later purchased by VoiceStream Wireless in 1999 which subsequently became T-Mobile US.

In August 2022, T-Mobile US announced dead-zone cell phone coverage across the US using "midband" (1900 MHz) PCS spectrum and Starlink Gen2 satellite cell coverage, to begin testing in 2023. Using this satellite and midband spectrum, T-Mobile plans to be able to connect by satellite to common mobile devices, unlike previous generations of satellite phones which used specialised Earth-bound radios to connect to geosynchronous satellites with characteristic long lag time in communications.

== Rest of the world ==
ITU Regions 1 and 3 (Eurasia, Africa) does not have a PCS band. The comparable technology in the context of GSM is GSM-1800, also known as "Digital Cellular System" (DCS). GSM-1800 launched in Hong Kong in 1997. It can form dual band service with GSM at 900MHz. This frequency was inherited into UMTS, LTE, and 5G NR.

Korea, which has never used GSM, runs CDMA on 1800 MHz. See CDMA frequency bands.

== See also ==
- Advanced Wireless Services – A wireless telecommunications spectrum band
- Cellular frequencies – Ultra high frequency radio bands assigned to mobile devices
- PTCRB – Certification forum
- SOAP – Messaging protocol for web services
