= UMTS frequency bands =

Radiofrequency bands used by 3G Universal Mobile Telecommunications System networks

The UMTS frequency bands are radio frequencies used by third generation (3G) wireless Universal Mobile Telecommunications System networks. They were allocated by delegates to the World Administrative Radio Conference (WARC-92) held in Málaga-Torremolinos, Spain between 3 February 1992 and 3 March 1992. Resolution 212 (Rev.WRC-97), adopted at the World Radiocommunication Conference held in Geneva, Switzerland in 1997, endorsed the bands specifically for the International Mobile Telecommunications-2000 (IMT-2000) specification by referring to S5.388, which states "The bands 1,885-2,025 MHz and 2,110-2,200 MHz are intended for use, on a worldwide basis, by administrations wishing to implement International Mobile Telecommunications 2000 (IMT-2000). Such use does not preclude the use of these bands by other services to which they are allocated. The bands should be made available for IMT-2000 in accordance with Resolution 212 (Rev. WRC-97)." To accommodate the reality that these initially defined bands were already in use in various regions of the world, the initial allocation has been amended multiple times to include other radio frequency bands.

== UMTS-FDD frequency bands and channel bandwidths ==
From Tables 5.0 "UTRA FDD frequency bands" of the latest published version of the 3GPP TS 25.101, the following table lists the specified frequency bands of UMTS (FDD):

UTRA band	ƒ (MHz)	Common name	Subset of band	Uplink (MHz)	Downlink (MHz)	UARFCN UL channel number	UARFCN DL channel number	Duplex gap (MHz)	Notes
1	2100	IMT		1920 – 1980	2110 – 2170	9612 – 9888	10562 – 10838	190	
2	1900	PCS	25	1850 – 1910	1930 – 1990	9262 – 9538 additional 12, 37, 62, 87, 112, 137, 162, 187, 212, 237, 262, 287	9662 – 9938 additional 412, 437, 462, 487, 512, 537, 562, 587, 612, 637, 662, 687	80	
3	1800	DCS		1710 – 1785	1805 – 1880	937 – 1288	1162 – 1513	95	
4	1700	AWS-1	10	1710 – 1755	2110 – 2155	1312 – 1513 additional 1662, 1687, 1712, 1737, 1762, 1787, 1812, 1837, 1862	1537 – 1738 additional 1887, 1912, 1937, 1962, 1987, 2012, 2037, 2062, 2087	400	
5	850	CLR	26	824 – 849	869 – 894	4132 – 4233 additional 782, 787, 807, 812, 837, 862	4357 – 4458 additional 1007, 1012, 1032, 1037, 1062, 1087	45	
6	800	UMTS 800	5, 26	830 – 840	875 – 885	4162 – 4188 additional 812, 837	4387 – 4413 additional 1037, 1062	45	
7	2600	IMT-E		2500 – 2570	2620 – 2690	2012 – 2338 additional 2362, 2387, 2412, 2437, 2462, 2487, 2512, 2537, 2562, 2587, 2612, 2637, 2662, 2687	2237 – 2563 additional 2587, 2612, 2637, 2662, 2687, 2712, 2737, 2762, 2787, 2812, 2837, 2862, 2887, 2912	120	
8	900	E-GSM		880 – 915	925 – 960	2712 – 2863	2937 – 3088	45	
9	1700	UMTS 1700	3	1749.9 – 1784.9	1844.9 – 1879.9	8762 – 8912	9237 – 9387	95	
10	1700	Extended AWS		1710 – 1770	2110 – 2170	2887 – 3163 additional 3187, 3212, 3237, 3262, 3287, 3312, 3337, 3362, 3387, 3412, 3437, 3462	3112 – 3388 additional 3412, 3437, 3462, 3487, 3512, 3537, 3562, 3587, 3612, 3637, 3662, 3687	400	
11	1500	Lower PDC		1427.9 – 1447.9	1475.9 – 1495.9	3487 – 3562	3712 – 3787	48	
12	700	Lower SMH		699 – 716	729 – 746	3617 – 3678 additional 3707, 3732, 3737, 3762, 3767	3842 – 3903 additional 3932, 3957, 3962, 3987, 3992	30	
13	700	Upper SMH		777 – 787	746 – 756	3792 – 3818 additional 3842, 3867	4017 – 4043 additional 4067, 4092	31	
14	700	Upper SMH		788 – 798	758 – 768	3892 – 3918 additional 3942, 3967	4117 – 4143 additional 4167, 4192	30	
15		Reserved							
16		Reserved							
17		Reserved							
18		Reserved							
19	800	Upper 800 (Japan)	26	830 – 845	875 – 890	312 – 363 additional 387, 412, 437	712 – 763 additional 787, 812, 837	45	
20	800	Digital Dividend (EU)		832 – 862	791 – 821	4287 – 4413	4512 – 4638	41	
21	1500	Upper PDC		1447.9 – 1462.9	1495.9 – 1510.9	462 – 512	862 – 912	48	
22	3500	C-Band		3410 – 3490	3510 – 3590	4437 – 4813	4662 – 5038	100	
23		Reserved							
24		Reserved							
25	1900	Extended PCS		1850 – 1915	1930 – 1995	4887 – 5188 additional 6067, 6092, 6117, 6142, 6167, 6192, 6217, 6242, 6267, 6292, 6317, 6342, 6367	5112 – 5413 additional 6292, 6317, 6342, 6367, 6392, 6417, 6442, 6467, 6492, 6517, 6542, 6567, 6592	80	
26	850	Extended CLR		814 – 849	859 – 894	5537 – 5688 additional 5712, 5737, 5762, 5767, 5787, 5792, 5812, 5817, 5837, 5842, 5862	5762 – 5913 additional 5937, 5962, 5987, 5992, 6012, 6017, 6037, 6042, 6062, 6067, 6087	45	
27		Reserved							
28		Reserved							
29		Reserved							
30		Reserved							
31		Reserved							
32 (Note: Band 32 is restricted to UTRA operation when dual band is configured (e.g., DB-DC-HSDPA or dual band 4C-HSDPA).) (Note: Supplemental Downlink)	1500	L-band (EU)		—N/a	1452 – 1496	—N/a	6617 – 6813 additional 6837, 6862, 6887, 6912, 6937, 6962, 6987, 7012	—N/a	

== Deployments by region (UMTS-FDD) ==
The following table shows the standardized UMTS bands and their regional use. The main UMTS bands are in bold print.

- **Networks on UMTS-bands 1 and 8 are suitable for global roaming in ITU Regions 1, 2 (some countries) and 3.**
- Networks on UMTS bands 2 and 4 are suitable for roaming in ITU Region 2 (Americas) only.
- Networks on UMTS band 5 are suitable for roaming in ITU Regions 2 and 3 (single countries).

UTRA band	ƒ (MHz)	Common name	North America (Note: ITU Region 2)	Central and South America	Caribbean	Europe (Note: ITU Region 1)	Africa	Asia (Note: ITU Region 3)	Oceania
**01**	**2100**	**IMT**	No	Aruba (SetarNV), Uruguay (Ancel), Brazil, Costa Rica	Cuba (ETECSA)	Phase-out	Yes	Yes	Phase-out
**02**	**1900**	**PCS**	Yes	Yes	Yes	No	No	No	No
04	1700	AWS-1	Canada (Eastlink, Vidéotron, Freedom); Mexico (AT&T)	Chile (WOM); Colombia (WOM)	—N/a	No	No	No	No
**05**	**850**	**CLR**	Yes	Yes	Yes	No	No	Israel (Cellcom), Thailand (CAT, True)	Australia (Telstra), New Zealand (Spark)
06	800	UMTS 800	No	No	No	No	No	Japan (NTT docomo)	No
**08**	**900**	**E-GSM**	No	Paraguay (VOX), Venezuela (Digitel)	Cuba (ETECSA), Dominican Republic (Orange)	Yes	Angola (Movicel), Equatorial Guinea (Muni), Ghana (MTN), Sierra Leone (Africell), Uganda (Aircel, MTN), South Africa (MTN), Tunisia (Ooredoo)	China (Unicom), Hong Kong (3, csl), Israel (Partner), Japan (Softbank), Kyrgyzstan (Megacom, O!), Malaysia (U Mobile), Myanmar (Ooredoo), Pakistan (Ufone), Philippines (Globe, Smart), Qatar (Ooredoo, Vodafone), Singapore (Singtel)	Australia (Optus, VHA), New Zealand (2degrees, Vodafone)
09	1700	UMTS 1700	No	No	No	No	No	Japan (NTT docomo, SoftBank)	No
11	1500	Lower PDC	No	No	No	No	No	Japan (SoftBank)	No
19	800	Upper 800 (Japan)	No	No	No	No	No	Japan (NTT docomo)	No

== UMTS-TDD frequency bands and channel bandwidths ==
UMTS-TDD technology is standardized for usage in the following bands:

Operating band	Frequency band	Frequency (MHz)	UARFCN channel number
A (lower)	IMT	1900 – 1920	9504 – 9596
A (upper)	IMT	2010 – 2025	10054 – 10121
B (lower)	PCS	1850 – 1910	9254 – 9546
B (upper)	PCS	1930 – 1990	9654 – 9946
C	PCS (Duplex-Gap)	1910 – 1930	9554 – 9646
D	IMT-E	2570 – 2620	12854 – 13096
E	S-Band	2300 – 2400	11504 – 11996
F	DCS–IMT Gap	1880 – 1920	9404 – 9596

== See also ==
- 3GPP
- List of UMTS networks
- Cellular frequencies
- GSM frequency bands
- LTE frequency bands
- 5G NR frequency bands
- CDMA frequency bands
- Mobile network code
- Roaming
- United States 2008 wireless spectrum auction
- White spaces (radio)
