= List of CDMA2000 networks =

A list of CDMA2000 networks worldwide.

== Active networks ==
Legend	Private network for critical infrastructure	Network to shut down

Operator	Country	Technology	Frequency (MHz)	Launch date	Notes
ArgoNET	Austria	CDMA2000 EV-DO Rev. B	450	Nov 2014	4,44 MHz; Exclusive use for M2M, emergency communication and Smart Metering.
Alliander	Netherlands	CDMA2000 1xRTT, EV-DO Rev. A	450	May 2016	3 MHz; Exclusive use for M2M communication and Smart Metering.
450connect	Germany	CDMA2000 1xRTT, EV-DO Rev. A	450	Nov 2016	2x 1,25 MHz; Exclusive use for M2M communication and Smart Metering.
CNT Mobile	Ecuador	CDMA2000 1xRTT, EV-DO Rev. A	450 / ~~800~~	Dec 2002	
MPT	Myanmar	CDMA2000 1xRTT	450 / 800	Aug 2000	
Perfectum Mobile	Uzbekistan	CDMA2000 1xRTT, EV-DO Rev. A	800	Sep 2001	
Yemen Mobile	Yemen	CDMA2000 1xRTT, EV-DO Rev. A	800	Sep 2004	

== Defunct networks ==
Operator	Country	Technology	Frequency (MHz)	Launch date	End of service	Notes
Movicel	Angola	CDMA2000 1xRTT, EV-DO Rev. A	800	Apr 2004	Mar 2016	
BelCel	Belarus	CDMA2000 1xRTT, EV-DO Rev. A	450	Feb 2003	Jan 2014	
Vivo	Brazil	CDMA2000 1xRTT, EV-DO Rev. A	1900	Mar 2003	Jun 2012	
Bell	Canada	CDMA2000 1xRTT, EV-DO Rev. A	800 / 1900	Feb 2002	Apr 2019	EV-DO service shut down in Jul 2015.
Public Mobile	Canada	CDMA2000 1xRTT, EV-DO Rev. A	1900	May 2010	May 2014	Operator acquired by Telus.
SaskTel	Canada	CDMA2000 1xRTT, EV-DO Rev. A	800	Apr 2003	Jul 2017	EV-DO service shut down in Sep 2014.
TBayTel	Canada	CDMA2000 1xRTT, EV-DO Rev. A	800 / 1900	Dec 2002	Oct 2014	
Telus	Canada	CDMA2000 1xRTT, EV-DO Rev. A	800	Jun 2002	May 2017	EV-DO service shut down in Mar 2014.
China Telecom	China	CDMA2000 1xRTT, EV-DO Rev. B	800	Mar 2003	Dec 2023	Initially constructed by China Unicom, sold to China Telecom in 2008.correspond spectrum refarmed to LTE in Jul 2016. Gradual network shutdown commenced in Jun 2020.
Nordic Telecom	Czech Republic	CDMA2000 1xRTT, EV-DO Rel. A	450	May 2007	Dec 2017	
O_{2}	Czech Republic	CDMA2000 1xRTT, EV-DO Rev. A	450	May 2007 / Aug 2004	Jun 2019	
Net1	Denmark	CDMA2000 1xRTT, EV-DO Rev. A	450	Jan 2008	2015 ?	Former operator NMT filed for bankruptcy.
Ukko Mobile	Finland	CDMA2000 1xRTT, EV-DO Rev. B	450	2012	Dec 2014	
csl	Hong Kong	CDMA2000 1xRTT, EV-DO Rev. A	800	Nov 2008	Oct 2017	Provider formerly branded as PCCW. CDMA service suspended starting from 31 Oct 2017.
BSNL	India	CDMA2000 1xRTT, EV-DO Rev. A	800	Mar 2005	Mar 2016	
MTS	India	CDMA2000 1xRTT, EV-DO Rev. B	800	Sep 2003	Nov 2017	
RCOM	India	CDMA2000 1xRTT, EV-DO Rev. A	800	May 2003	Jun 2016	
Tata Docomo	India	CDMA2000 1xRTT, EV-DO Rev. B	800	Nov 2002	Mar 2018	
Indosat	Indonesia	CDMA2000 1xRTT, EV-DO Rel. 0	800	May 2004	Jun 2015	Spectrum re-allocated for E-GSM 900 (Band 8).
Net 1	Indonesia	CDMA2000 1xRTT, EV-DO Rev. A	450	Apr 2004	2018 ?	
Smartfren	Indonesia	CDMA2000 1xRTT, EV-DO Rel. 0, EV-DO Rev. A, EV-DO Rev. B	800 / 1900	Dec 2003	Nov 2017 (800) / Dec 2016 (1900)	1900 MHz spectrum re-allocated for UMTS 2100 (Band 1).
Telkom	Indonesia	CDMA2000 1xRTT, EV-DO Rel. 0	800	Dec 2002	May 2014	Spectrum re-allocated for E-GSM 900 (Band 8).
au (KDDI)	Japan	CDMA2000 1xRTT, EV-DO Rev. B	800	Apr 2002	Mar 2022	No new applications for CDMA service were accepted after 7 Nov 2018. Voice data via IP over the CDMA2000 1x EV-DO network.
Interdnestrcom	Moldova	CDMA2000 1xRTT, EV-DO Rel. 0, EV-DO Rev. A	450 / 800	Sep 2002	Sep 2020 (450) / Aug 2023 (800)	Coverage only in Transnistria.
Skytel	Mongolia	CDMA2000 1xRTT, EV-DO Rev. A	450 / 800	Feb 2001	Jun 2025	
Telecom Namibia	Namibia	CDMA2000 1xRTT, EV-DO Rel. 0	450 / 800	Nov 2006	Apr 2015	
Telecom New Zealand	New Zealand	CDMA2000 1xRTT, EV-DO Rev. A	800	Jul 2001	Jul 2012	
Ice.net	Norway	CDMA2000 1xRTT, EV-DO Rev. B	450	Jun 2006	2015 ?	Former operator NMT filed for bankruptcy.
Orange	Poland	CDMA2000 1xRTT, EV-DO Rev. B	450	Dec 2008	Apr 2017	
Sferia	Poland	CDMA2000 1xRTT	800	Jun 2003	Feb 2014	Spectrum re-allocated to EUDD 800 (Band 20).
SkyLink	Russia	CDMA2000 1xRTT, EV-DO Rev. A	450	Dec 2002	Oct 2016	Subsidiary of Rostelecom.
Neotel	South Africa	CDMA2000 1xRTT, EV-DO Rev. A	800	May 2008	May 2019	
KT	South Korea	CDMA2000 1xRTT, EV-DO Rel. 0	800	Apr 2001	Mar 2012	CDMA2000 1xEV-DO was also referred to as "2G" in South Korea, besides cdmaOne (IS-95). KT also operates an UMTS "3G" network.
LG U+	South Korea	CDMA2000 1xRTT, EV-DO Rev. B	1800	Oct 2000	Jun 2021	
SK Telecom	South Korea	CDMA2000 1xRTT, EV-DO Rel. 0	800	Oct 2000	Jul 2020	CDMA2000 1xEV-DO was also referred to as "2G" in South Korea, besides cdmaOne (IS-95). SKT also operates an UMTS "3G" network.
Net1	Sweden	CDMA2000 1xRTT, EV-DO Rev. B	450	Jan 2008	2015 ?	Former operator NMT filed for bankruptcy.
APT	Taiwan	CDMA2000 1xRTT, EV-DO Rev. A	800	Jul 2003	Dec 2017	
CAT	Thailand	CDMA2000 1xRTT, EV-DO Rev. A	800	Jan 2007	Apr 2013	
MTS	Ukraine	CDMA2000 1xRTT, EV-DO Rev. B	450	Oct 2007	Jun 2018	Only data services.
Intertelecom	Ukraine	CDMA2000 1xRTT, EV-DO Rev. B	800	March 2001	Jan 2025	
PEOPLEnet	Ukraine	CDMA2000 1xRTT, EV-DO Rev. A	800	Feb 2007	Jan 2025	
Cellcom	United States	CDMA2000 1xRTT, EV-DO Rev. A	800 / 1900	Nov 2004	Dec 2023	Data services discontinued on 31 Mar 2023.
Illinois Valley Cellular	United States	CDMA2000 1xRTT, EV-DO Rev. A	800 / 1900	Jan 2003	Dec 2023	Operator acquired by AT&T.
Leap Wireless (Cricket)	United States	CDMA2000 1xRTT, EV-DO Rev. A	1900	Dec 2001	Sep 2015	Operator acquired by AT&T.
MetroPCS	United States	CDMA2000 1xRTT, EV-DO Rev. A	1900	Feb 2002	Jun 2015	Operator acquired by T-Mobile.
Sprint (incl. Open Mobile)	United States; Puerto Rico; U.S. Virgin Islands	CDMA2000 1xRTT, EV-DO Rev. A	800 (BC10); 1900	Aug 2002	Mar 2022	Operator acquired by T-Mobile.
UScellular	United States	CDMA2000 1xRTT, EV-DO Rev. A	800 / 1900	Oct 2002	Jan 2024	Gradual EV-DO shut down since Oct 2021. Network shutdown was originally scheduled for 14 Jan 2024, but finally concluded on 19 Jan 2024.
Verizon	United States	CDMA2000 1xRTT, EV-DO Rev. A	800 / 1900	Jan 2002	Dec 2022	Activation for devices that are not VoLTE capable ended on 30 Jun 2018.
Movilnet	Venezuela	CDMA2000 1xRTT, EV-DO Rel. 0	800	Nov 2002	Oct 2020	
Movistar	Venezuela	CDMA2000 1xRTT, EV-DO Rel. 0	800	Dec 2005	Mar 2014	

== See also ==
- List of mobile network operators
- CDMA frequency bands
- List of 5G NR networks
- List of LTE networks
- List of UMTS networks
