= Wireless Communications Service =

Set of frequency bands for wireless communications

Wireless Communications Service (WCS) is a set of frequency bands designated in the United States and Canada in the 2305–2320 and 2345–2360 MHz spectrum range. The most common use of WCS spectrum is mobile voice and data services, including cell phone, text messaging, and Internet.

== Technical specifications ==
There are four blocks in WCS:

- A Block (2305–2310 and 2350–2355 MHz)
- B Block (2310–2315 and 2355–2360 MHz)
- C Block (2315–2320 MHz)
- D Block (2345–2350 MHz)

The WCS frequency band is not contiguous, and in the United States the 2305–2360 MHz band is split between cellular networks and satellite radio (SDARS) users. The WCS C and D Blocks abut the SDARS spectrum allocation, which is 2320–2345 MHz.

== Interference ==
AT&T and SiriusXM have previously raised interference concerns due to the proximity of these two spectrum allocations.
