= CDMA frequency bands =

International Telecommunications Union-approved frequency bands for cdmaOne and CDMA2000

CDMA frequency bands or frequency ranges are the cellular frequencies designated by the ITU for the operation of cdmaOne and CDMA2000 mobile phones and other mobile devices.

== Frequency bands ==
From the latest published version of the respective 3GPP2 technical standard (C.S0057-F), the following table lists the specified frequency bands of the cdmaOne and CDMA2000 standards.

Band class	ƒ (MHz)	Common name	Uplink (MHz)	Downlink (MHz)	Duplex spacing (MHz)
0	800	800 MHz	815 - 849	860 - 894	45
1	1900	1900 MHz	1850 - 1910	1930 - 1990	80
2	900	TACS	872 - 915	917 - 960	45
3	850	JTACS	887 - 925	832 - 870	-55
4	1800	Korean PCS	1750 - 1780	1840 - 1870	90
5	450	450 MHz	410 - 483	420 - 493	10
6	2100	2 GHz	1920 - 1980	2110 - 2170	190
7	700	Upper 700 MHz	776 - 788	746 - 758	-30
8	1800	1800 MHz	1710 - 1785	1805 - 1880	95
9	900	900 MHz	880 - 915	925 - 960	45
10	800	Secondary 800 MHz	806 - 891	851 - 940	45
11	400	400 MHz European PAMR	410 - 483	420 - 493	10
12	800	800 MHz PAMR	870 - 876	915 - 921	45
13	2500	2.5 GHz IMT-2000 Extension	2500 - 2570	2620 - 2690	120
14	1900	U.S. PCS 1.9 GHz	1850 - 1915	1930 - 1995	80
15	1700	AWS	1710 - 1755	2110 - 2155	400
16	2500	U.S. 2.5 GHz	2502 - 2568	2624 - 2690	122
18	700	700 MHz Public Safety	787 - 799	757 - 769	-30
19	700	Lower 700 MHz	698 - 716	728 - 746	30
20	1600	L-Band	1626.5 - 1660.5	1525 - 1559	-101.5
21	2000	S-Band	2000 - 2020	2180 - 2200	180

== See also ==
- List of CDMA2000 networks
- 3GPP2
- Cellular frequencies
- OD-GPS
- Roaming
- GSM frequency bands
- UMTS frequency bands
- LTE frequency bands
- 5G NR frequency bands
