= 5G NR frequency bands =

5G New Radio (5G NR), which is the air interface or radio access technology of the 5G mobile networks, operate in two different frequency bands. Frequency Range 1 (FR1) originally includes sub-6 GHz frequency bands, some of which are traditionally used by previous standards, and has been extended to cover potential new spectrum offerings from 410 MHz to 7125 MHz. Frequency Range 2 (FR2) includes frequency bands from 24.25 GHz to 71.0 GHz.

In 2023, Frequency Range 3 (FR3), covering frequencies from 7.125 GHz to 24.25 GHz, was proposed by the World Radio Conference; as of September 2024, this band has not been added to the official standard. Frequency bands are also available for non-terrestrial networks (NTN) in both the sub-6 GHz and in the 17.3 GHz to 30 GHz ranges.

== Frequency bands ==
From the latest published version (Rel. 19) of the respective 3GPP technical standard (TS 38 series),^{,}^{,}^{,} the following tables list the specified frequency bands and the channel bandwidths of the 5G NR standard.

Note that the NR bands are defined with prefix of "n". When the NR band is overlapping with the 4G LTE band, they share the same band number.

=== Frequency Range 1 ===
Legend	Supplemental Downlink (SDL)	Supplemental Uplink (SUL)

Band	Duplex mode (Note: Frequency-division duplexing (FDD); time-division duplexing (TDD); FDD supplemental downlink (SDL); FDD supplemental uplink (SUL))	ƒ (MHz)	Common name	Subset of band	Uplink (Note: UE transmit; BS receive) (MHz)	Downlink (Note: UE receive; BS transmit) (MHz)	Duplex spacing (MHz)	Channel bandwidths (Note: Supported channel bandwidths depend on the Subcarrier Spacing (SCS) in use) (MHz)	Notes
n1	FDD	2100	IMT	n65	1920 – 1980	2110 – 2170	190	5, 10, 15, 20, 25, 30, 40, 45, 50	
n2	FDD	1900	PCS	n25	1850 – 1910	1930 – 1990	80	5, 10, 15, 20, 25, 30, 35, 40	
n3	FDD	1800	DCS		1710 – 1785	1805 – 1880	95	5, 10, 15, 20, 25, 30, 35, 40, 45, 50	
n5	FDD	850	CLR	n26	824 – 849	869 – 894	45	3, 5, 7, 10, 15, 20, 25 (Note: Downlink only)	
n7	FDD	2600	IMT‑E		2500 – 2570	2620 – 2690	120	5, 10, 15, 20, 25, 30, 35, 40, 50	
n8	FDD	900	Extended GSM		880 – 915	925 – 960	45	5, 10, 15, 20, 25, 35	
n12	FDD	700	Lower SMH	n85	699 – 716	729 – 746	30	3, 5, 10, 15	
n13	FDD	700	Upper SMH		777 – 787	746 – 756	−31	5, 10	
n14	FDD	700	Upper SMH		788 – 798	758 – 768	−30	5, 10	
n18	FDD	850	Lower 800	n26	815 – 830	860 – 875	45	5, 10, 15	Japan
n20	FDD	800	Digital Dividend		832 – 862	791 – 821	−41	5, 10, 15, 20	EU
n24	FDD	1600	Upper L-band		1626.5 – 1660.5 (Note: Uplink restricted to 1627.5–1637.5 MHz and 1646.5–1656.5 MHz)	1525 – 1559 (Note: Downlink restricted to 1526–1536 MHz)	−101.5	5, 10	US
n25	FDD	1900	Extended PCS		1850 – 1915	1930 – 1995	80	5, 10, 15, 20, 25, 30, 35, 40, 45	
n26	FDD	850	Extended CLR		814 – 849	859 – 894	45	3, 5, 7, 10, 15, 20, 25 (Note: Carrier aggregation and downlink only), 30	
n28	FDD	700	APT		703 – 748	758 – 803	55	3, 5, 10, 15, 20, 25, 30	
n29	SDL	700	Lower SMH		—N/a	717 – 728	—N/a	5, 10	
n30	FDD	2300	WCS		2305 – 2315	2350 – 2360	45	5, 10	
n31	FDD	450	NMT		452.5 – 457.5	462.5 – 467.5	10	3, 5	
n34	TDD	2100	IMT		2010 – 2025		—N/a	5, 10, 15	
n38	TDD	2600	IMT‑E (Note: Duplex Spacing)	n41, n90	2570 – 2620		—N/a	5, 10, 15, 20, 25, 30, 40	
n39	TDD	1900	DCS–IMT Gap		1880 – 1920		—N/a	5, 10, 15, 20, 25, 30, 35, 40	
n40	TDD	2300	S-Band		2300 – 2400		—N/a	5 (Note: Carrier aggregation or dual connectivity only), 10, 15, 20, 25, 30, 40, 50, 60, 70, 80, 90, 100	
n41	TDD	2500	BRS		2496 – 2690		—N/a	5, 10, 15, 20, 25, 30, 35, 40, 45, 50, 60, 70, 80, 90, 100	
n46	TDD	5200	U-NII-1–4		5150 – 5925		—N/a	10, 20, 40, 60, 80, 100	(Note: 5G NR Unlicensed)
n47	TDD	5900	U-NII-4		5855 – 5925		—N/a	10, 20, 30, 40	V2X
n48	TDD	3500	CBRS	n77, n78	3550 – 3700		—N/a	5, 10, 15, 20, 30, 40, 50, 60, 70, 80, 90, 100	US
n50	TDD	1500	L‑Band		1432 – 1517		—N/a	5, 10, 15, 20, 30, 40, 50, 60, 80	EU
n51	TDD	1500	L‑Band Extension		1427 – 1432		—N/a	5	EU
n53	TDD	2400	S band		2483.5 – 2495		—N/a	5, 10	
n54	TDD	1600	L-band		1670 – 1675		—N/a	5	
n65	FDD	2100	Extended IMT		1920 – 2010	2110 – 2200	190	5, 10, 15, 20, 50	
n66	FDD	_{1700}^{2100}	Extended AWS		1710 – 1780	2110 – 2200 (Note: Downlink between 2180–2200 MHz restricted to intra-band Supplemental Downlink)	400	5, 10, 15, 20, 25, 30, 35, 40, 45	(Note: Supports asymmetrical bandwidth combinations)
n67	SDL	700	EU 700		—N/a	738 – 758	—N/a	5, 10, 15, 20	
n68	FDD	700	ME 700		698 – 728	753 – 783	55	5, 10, 15	MEA
n70	FDD	2000	Supplementary AWS		1695 – 1710	1995 – 2020	300	5, 10, 15, 20, 25	
n71	FDD	600	Digital Dividend		663 – 698	617 – 652	−46	5, 10, 15, 20, 25, 30, 35	US
n72	FDD	450	PMR		451 – 456	461 – 466	10	3, 5	EU
n74	FDD	1500	Lower L‑Band		1427 – 1470	1475 – 1518	48	5, 10, 15, 20	US
n75	SDL	1500	L‑Band		—N/a	1432 – 1517	—N/a	5, 10, 15, 20, 25, 30, 40, 50	EU
n76	SDL	1500	L‑Band Extension		—N/a	1427 – 1432	—N/a	5	EU
n77	TDD	3700	C-Band		3300 – 4200		—N/a	10, 15, 20, 25, 30, 40, 50, 60, 70, 80, 90, 100	
n78	TDD	3500	C-Band	n77	3300 – 3800		—N/a	10, 15, 20, 25, 30, 40, 50, 60, 70, 80, 90, 100	
n79	TDD	4500	C-Band		4400 – 5000		—N/a	10, 20, 30, 40, 50, 60, 70, 80, 90, 100	
n80	SUL	1800	DCS		1710 – 1785	—N/a	—N/a	5, 10, 15, 20, 25, 30, 40	
n81	SUL	900	Extended GSM		880 – 915	—N/a	—N/a	5, 10, 15, 20	
n82	SUL	800	Digital Dividend		832 – 862	—N/a	—N/a	5, 10, 15, 20	EU
n83	SUL	700	APT		703 – 748	—N/a	—N/a	5, 10, 15, 20, 25, 30	
n84	SUL	2100	IMT		1920 – 1980	—N/a	—N/a	5, 10, 15, 20, 25, 30, 40, 50	
n85	FDD	700	Extended Lower SMH		698 – 716	728 – 746	30	3, 5, 10, 15	
n86	SUL	1700	Extended AWS	n80	1710 – 1780	—N/a	—N/a	5, 10, 15, 20, 40	
n87	FDD	400	PMR		410 – 415	420 – 425	10	3, 5	
n88	FDD	400	PMR		412 – 417	422 – 427	10	3, 5	
n89	SUL	850	CLR		824 – 849	—N/a	—N/a	5, 10, 15, 20,	
n90	TDD	2500	BRS		2496 – 2690		—N/a	5, 10, 15, 20, 25, 30, 35, 40, 45, 50, 60, 70, 80, 90, 100	(Note: Technologically identical to n41 but requires UL rasterization to allow for DSS)
n91	FDD	_{800}^{1500}	_{DD}^{L-Band}	n20, n51	832 – 862	1427 – 1432	570 – 595 (Note: Variable duplex operation is used such that the Downlink and Uplink frequency ranges are supported independently in any valid frequency range for the band)	5, 10 (Note: Uplink only)	EU
n92	FDD	_{800}^{1500}	_{DD}^{L-Band}	n20, n50	832 – 862	1432 – 1517	600 – 660	5, 10, 15, 20	EU
n93	FDD	_{900}^{1500}	_{Extended GSM}^{L-Band}	n8, n51	880 – 915	1427 – 1432	527 – 547	5, 10	EU
n94	FDD	_{900}^{1500}	_{Extended GSM}^{L-Band}	n8, n50	880 – 915	1432 – 1517	532 – 632	5, 10, 15, 20	EU
n95	SUL	2100	IMT		2010 – 2025	—N/a	—N/a	5, 10, 15	(Note: This band is applicable in China only)
n96	TDD	6000	U-NII-5–8		5925 – 7125		—N/a	20, 40, 60, 80, 100	
n97	SUL	2300	S-Band		2300 – 2400	—N/a	—N/a	5, 10, 15, 20, 25, 30, 40, 50, 60, 70, 80, 90, 100	
n98	SUL	1900	DCS–IMT Gap		1880 – 1920	—N/a	—N/a	5, 10, 15, 20, 25, 30, 35, 40	
n99	SUL	1600	Upper L-band		1626.5 – 1660.5	—N/a	—N/a	5, 10	US
n100	FDD	900	GSM-R		874.4 – 880	919.4 – 925	45	3, 5	EU
n101	TDD	1900	FRMCS	n39	1900 – 1910		—N/a	5, 10	
n102	TDD	6200	U-NII-5	n96	5925 – 6425		—N/a	20, 40, 60, 80, 100	
n104	TDD	6700	U-NII-6–8		6425 – 7125		—N/a	20, 30, 40, 50, 60, 70, 80, 90, 100	
n105	FDD	600	Digital Dividend		663 – 703	612 – 652	−51	5, 10, 15, 20, 25, 30, 35	APT
n106	FDD	900	LMRS		896 – 901	935 – 940	39	3	US
n109	FDD	_{700}^{1500}	_{APT}^{L-Band}		703 – 733	1432 – 1517	729	5, 10, 15, 20, 25, 30, 40, 50	EU
n110	FDD	1400	L-Band		1390 – 1395	1432 – 1435	42	3	

=== Frequency Range 2 ===
Band	ƒ (GHz)	Common name	Subset of band	Uplink / Downlink (Note: Time-division duplexing (TDD) mode) (GHz)	Channel bandwidths (Note: Supported channel bandwidths depend on the Subcarrier Spacing (SCS) in use) (MHz)	Notes
n257	28	LMDS		26.50 – 29.50	50, 100, 200, 400	
n258	26	K-band		24.25 – 27.50	50, 100, 200, 400	
n259	41	V-band		39.50 – 43.50	50, 100, 200, 400	
n260	39	Ka-band		37.00 – 40.00	50, 100, 200, 400	
n261	28	Ka-band	n257	27.50 – 28.35	50, 100, 200, 400	
n262	47	V-band		47.20 – 48.20	50, 100, 200, 400	
n263	60	V-band		57.00 – 71.00	100, 400, 800, 1600, 2000	(Note: 5G NR Unlicensed)

=== Non-terrestrial Frequency Range 1 ===
Band (Note: NTN satellite bands are numbered in descending order from n256)	Duplex mode (Note: Frequency-division duplexing (FDD); time-division duplexing (TDD); FDD supplemental downlink (SDL); FDD supplemental uplink (SUL))	ƒ (MHz)	Common name	Uplink (Note: UE transmit; BS receive) (MHz)	Downlink (Note: UE receive; BS transmit) (MHz)	Duplex spacing (MHz)	Channel bandwidths (Note: Supported channel bandwidths depend on the Subcarrier Spacing (SCS) in use) (MHz)	Notes
n256	FDD	2100	S-band	1980 – 2010	2170 – 2200	190	3, 5, 10, 15, 20	MSS
n255	FDD	1600	L-band	1626.5 – 1660.5	1525 – 1559	−101.5	3, 5, 10, 15, 20	MSS
n254	FDD	2400	S-band (downlink) L-band (uplink)	1610 – 1626.5	2483.5 – 2500	873.5	3, 5, 10, 15	MSS
n253	FDD	1600	L-band	1668 – 1675	1518 – 1525	−150	5	MSS
n252	FDD	2100	AWS-4	2000 – 2020	2180 – 2200	180	5, 10, 15, 20	MSS
n251	FDD	1600	L-band	1626.5 – 1660.5	1518 – 1559	−108.5	5, 10, 15, 20	MSS
n250	FDD	1600	L-band	1668 – 1675	1518 – 1559	−150	5, 10, 15, 20	(Note: Larger bandwidths only applicable to downlink)
n248	FDD	14000	Ku-band	14000 – 14500	10700 – 12750		10, 15, 20, 25, 35, 50, 70, 100	(Note: Downlink limited at 12200 or 12700 MHz according to the region)
n247	FDD	14000	Ku-band	13750 – 14000	10700 – 12750		10, 15, 20, 25, 35, 50, 70, 100	

=== Non-terrestrial Frequency Range 2 ===
Band	Duplex mode (Note: Frequency-division duplexing (FDD); time-division duplexing (TDD); FDD supplemental downlink (SDL); FDD supplemental uplink (SUL))	ƒ (GHz)	Common name	Uplink (Note: UE transmit; BS receive) (GHz)	Downlink (Note: UE receive; BS transmit) (GHz)	Channel bandwidths (Note: Supported channel bandwidths depend on the Subcarrier Spacing (SCS) in use) (MHz)	Notes
n512	FDD	28	Ka-band	27.50 – 30.00	17.30 – 20.20	50, 100, 200, 400	EU
n511	FDD	28	Ka-band	28.35 – 30.00	17.30 – 20.20	50, 100, 200, 400	US
n510	FDD	28	Ka-band	27.50 – 28.35	17.30 – 20.20	50, 100, 200, 400	US
n509	FDD	14	Ku-band	14.00 – 14.50	10.70 – 12.75	50, 100, 200, 400	(Note: Downlink limited at 12.20 or 12.70 GHz according to the region)
n508	FDD	14	Ku-band	13.75 – 14.00	10.70 – 12.75	50, 100, 200, 400	(Note: Largest bandwidth only applicable to downlink)

== See also ==
- 5G
- 5G NR
- List of 5G NR networks
- LTE frequency bands
- UMTS frequency bands
- GSM frequency bands
- Cellular frequencies
