= List of UMTS networks =

The following is a list of mobile telecommunications networks using third-generation Universal Mobile Telecommunications System (UMTS) technology. This list does not aim to cover all networks, but instead focuses on networks deployed on frequencies other than 2100 MHz which is commonly deployed around the globe and on Multiband deployments.

== General information ==
- For technical details on UMTS and a list of its designated operating frequencies, bands, and their common names, see UMTS frequency bands.
- Networks on the global UMTS-bands 1 and 8 are suitable for global roaming in ITU Regions 1, 2 (some countries) and 3.
- Networks on UMTS-bands 2 and 4 allow roaming in ITU Region 2 (Americas) only.
- Networks on UMTS band 5 are suitable for roaming in ITU Regions 2 and 3 (single countries).

== Europe, Middle East & Africa (EMEA) ==
Networks in Europe, the Middle East and Africa are exclusively deployed on 2100 MHz (Band 1) and/or 900 MHz (Band 8).

== Americas ==
=== Caribbean ===
Operator	Country	2100 MHz Band 1	900 MHz Band 8	1900 MHz Band 2	850 MHz Band 5	Launch date UMTS ≤ 7.2 Mbit/s	Launch date HSPA+ ≤ 21.1 Mbit/s	Notes
Digicel	Anguilla		Jun 2013 (10 MHz)	Jun 2013 (5 MHz)		Jun 2013	Jun 2013	
FLOW	Anguilla				2014 (5 MHz)	(?) 2014	(?) 2014	
Digicel	Antigua and Barbuda			? (10 MHz)	? (10 MHz)	?	?	
FLOW	Antigua and Barbuda			May 2014 (5 MHz)	May 2014 (5 MHz)	May 2014	May 2014	
Setar	Aruba					Dec 2007		
Aliv	Bahamas			Nov 2016 (5 MHz)	Nov 2016 (5 MHz)	Nov 2016	Nov 2016	
BTC	Bahamas			Dec 2011 (10 MHz)	Dec 2011 (10 MHz)	Dec 2011	Dec 2011	
Digicel	Barbados	Nov 2011 (10 MHz)	Nov 2011 (10 MHz)			Nov 2011	Nov 2011	
FLOW	Barbados			Nov 2011 (10 MHz)	Nov 2011 (10 MHz)	Nov 2011	Nov 2011	
CellularOne	Bermuda			Jan 2011 (5 MHz)	Jan 2011 (10 MHz)	Jan 2011	Jan 2011	
Digicel	Bermuda	No	No	Jul 2010 (10 MHz) [refarmed to LTE]	Jun 2017 (?) (10 MHz)	Jul 2010	Jul 2010	
Digicel	British Virgin Islands			Nov 2012 (10 MHz)		Nov 2012	Nov 2012	
FLOW	British Virgin Islands				Jul 2012 (5 MHz)	Jul 2012	Jul 2012	
Digicel	Cayman Islands	Oct 2011 (5 MHz)	No	No	Oct 2011 (5 MHz)	Oct 2011	Oct 2011	
FLOW	Cayman Islands	No	No		Aug 2011 (10 MHz)	Aug 2011	Aug 2011	
ETECSA	Cuba	Apr 2017 (5 MHz)	Apr 2017 (15 MHz)			Apr 2017	Apr 2017	
Digicel	Dominica	Feb 2015 (5 MHz)	Feb 2015 (5 MHz)			Feb 2015	Feb 2015	
FLOW	Dominica			Oct 2014 (5 MHz)	Oct 2014 (5 MHz)	Oct 2014	Oct 2014	
Altice	Dominican Republic		Feb 2010 (10 MHz)		Feb 2010 (5 MHz)	Feb 2010	?	
Digicel	Haiti	May 2013 (10 MHz)			May 2013 (10 MHz)	May 2013	May 2013	
Digicel	Jamaica	No	No	2016 (20 MHz) [refarmed to LTE]	Jun 2012 (5 MHz)	Jun 2012	Jun 2012	
FLOW	Jamaica	No	No	Nov 2015 (?) (5 MHz)	Jun 2009 (5 MHz)	Jun 2009	Mar 2012	
Digicel	Montserrat		Jan 2015 (5 MHz)		Jan 2015 (5 MHz)	Jan 2015	Jan 2015	
FLOW	Montserrat						Dec 2014	
Digicel	Saint Kitts and Nevis		Apr 2013 (5 MHz)	Apr 2013 (10 MHz)		Apr 2013	Apr 2013	
FLOW	Saint Kitts and Nevis				Oct 2012 (10 MHz)	Oct 2012	Oct 2012	
Digicel	Saint Lucia		May 2014 (10 MHz)	May 2014 (5 MHz)		May 2014	May 2014	
FLOW	Saint Lucia				Jul 2013 (5 MHz)	Jul 2013	Jul 2013	
Digicel	Suriname	? (5 MHz)			Apr 2014 (5 MHz)		Apr 2014	
bmobile	Trinidad and Tobago	No	No	Nov 2012 (5 MHz)	Nov 2012 (5 MHz)	Nov 2012	Nov 2012	5 MHz of band 2 refarmed to LTE. 2.5 MHz of band 5 remain for GSM services.
Digicel	Trinidad and Tobago	No	No	May 2012 (10 MHz)	May 2012 (5 MHz)	May 2012	May 2012	1.5 MHz of band 5 remain for GSM services.
Digicel	Turks and Caicos Islands			? (10 MHz)		(?)	(?)	
FLOW	Turks and Caicos Islands				Jul 2012 (5 MHz)	Jul 2012	Jul 2012	

Operator	Country	Frequency (MHz)	Launch date	Notes
Orange	Guadeloupe		August 2013	
Orange	Martinique		August 2013	

=== North America, Central America and South America ===
Networks in this region are commonly deployed on 850 MHz (Band 5) and/or 1900 MHz (Band 2) unless denoted otherwise.

Operator	Country	2100 MHz Band 1	1900 MHz Band 2	1700 MHz Band 4	850 MHz Band 5	900 MHz Band 8	Launch date UMTS ≤ 7.2 Mbit/s	Launch date HSPA+ ≤ 21.1 Mbit/s	Launch date DC-HSPA ≤ 42.2 Mbit/s	Notes
Freedom Mobile	Canada			Dec 2009 (5 MHz)			Dec 2009			
Vidéotron	Canada			Sep 2010			Sep 2010	Sep 2010	Aug 2011	
AT&T	Mexico		(?) (5 MHz)	Sep 2012 (5 MHz)	(?) (5 MHz)		Sep 2012			
T-Mobile	United States		Sep 2012 – Jul 2022 (10 MHz) [refarmed to LTE/NR]	May 2008 – Jul 2022 (10 MHz) [refarmed to LTE/NR]			May 2008	May 2008	Apr 2011	
Algar Telecom	Brazil	Apr 2008 (5 MHz)					Apr 2008			
Claro	Brazil	Nov 2007 (5 MHz)			Nov 2007 (5 MHz)		Nov 2007	Nov 2007	Dec 2011	
Nextel	Brazil	Oct 2013 (5 MHz)					Oct 2013			
TIM	Brazil	Apr 2008 (5 MHz)			Apr 2008 (5 MHz)	Apr 2008 (5 MHz)	Apr 2008	Apr 2008	Oct 2010	
Vivo	Brazil	Nov 2011 (5 MHz)			Nov 2011 (5 MHz)		Nov 2011			
Digicel	El Salvador					Jan 2014 (5 MHz)	Jan 2014			
ANTEL	Uruguay	Jul 2007 (5 MHz)					Jul 2007			
Digitel	Venezuela					Mar 2009 (5 MHz)	Mar 2009			

== Asia & Oceania ==
Networks in Asia are commonly deployed on 2100 MHz (Band 1) unless denoted otherwise.

=== Deployments in Japan ===
Operator	Country	2100 MHz Band 1	900 MHz Band 8	800 MHz Band 6/19	1500 MHz Band 11 Band 21 (ex PDC)	1700 MHz Band 9	Launch date UMTS ≤ 7.2 Mbit/s	Launch date HSPA+ ≤ 21.1 Mbit/s	Launch date DC-HSPA ≤ 42.2 Mbit/s	Notes
NTT DoCoMo	Japan	FOMA; Oct 2001 (5 MHz used)	N/A	FOMA+ Jun 2005 – Jul 2016 (Refarmed for LTE)	No	May 2006 – Mar 2015 (Refarmed for LTE)	Oct 2001	N/A	N/A	First commercial UMTS network to be deployed. Band 6: (↓) 875 – 885 MHz / (↑) 830 – 840 MHz; Band 9: (↓) 1859.9 – 1879.9 MHz / (↑) 1764.9 – 1784.9 MHz; Band 19: (↓) 875 – 890 MHz / (↑) 830 – 845 MHz; Band 21: (↓) 1495.9 – 1510.9 MHz / (↑) 1447.9 – 1462.9 MHz; UMTS network to shut down on 31 Mar 2026.
SoftBank	Japan	Dec 2002 – Apr 2024 (Refarmed for LTE)	Jul 2012 – Apr 2024 (Refarmed for LTE)	N/A	Nov 2010 – Mar 2017 (Refarmed for LTE)	Mar 2007 – Jan 2018 (Refarmed for LTE)	Dec 2002	Aug 2009	Feb 2011 (Band 11)	Band 9: (↓) 1844.9 – 1859.9 MHz / (↑) 1749.9 – 1764.9 MHz; Band 11: (↓) 1475.9 – 1485.9 MHz / (↑) 1427.9 – 1437.9 MHz

=== 850 MHz (Band 5) / 900 MHz (Band 8) / 2100 MHz (Band 1) networks ===
Operator	Country	2100 MHz Band 1	900 MHz Band 8	850 MHz Band 5	Launch date UMTS ≤ 7.2 Mbit/s	Launch date HSPA+ ≤ 21.1 Mbit/s	Launch date DC-HSPA ≤ 42.2 Mbit/s	Notes
Optus	Australia	Apr 2005- Oct 2024	May 2008- Oct 2024	N/A	Apr 2005	(?)	(?)	
Vodafone (TPG Telecom)	Australia	Oct 2005- Jan 2024	Aug 2009- Jan 2024	Jan 2011- Jan 2024	Oct 2005	Jan 2008	Sep 2012	
Telstra	Australia	Sep 2005 - Aug 2012 (via NWS)	No	Oct 2006- Oct 2024	Sep 2005	Feb 2009	Feb 2010	
Bhutan Telecom	Bhutan	May 2008	No	Dec 2013	Dec 2013	Dec 2013		HSPA
TashiCell	Bhutan	No	No	Dec 2013	Dec 2013	Dec 2013		HSPA+
China Unicom	China	Oct 2009	Oct 2014- Jan 2025	N/A	Oct 2009	May 2011	Oct 2013	DC-HSDPA
csl.	Hong Kong	Dec 2004	Mar 2011	No	Dec 2004	Mar 2009	Nov 2010	DC-HSDPA
SmarTone	Hong Kong	Dec 2004	No	No	Nov 2009	Nov 2009; Apr 2010		HSPA+
Indosat	Indonesia	Nov 2006	Sep 2013	N/A	Oct 2009	May 2010	Sep 2013	DC-HSDPA
MegaCom	Kyrgyzstan	Jan 2012	Jan 2017	N/A	Jan 2012	Jan 2012	May 2015	
MPT	Myanmar	Jul 2008	No	N/A	Jul 2008			HSPA
Ooredoo	Myanmar	No	Aug 2014	N/A	Aug 2014	Aug 2014		HSPA+
Telenor	Myanmar	Aug 2014	No	N/A	Sep 2014	Sep 2014		HSPA+
2degrees	New Zealand	Aug 2010	(?)	N/A	Aug 2010	Aug 2010	Sep 2012	
Spark	New Zealand	(?)	N/A	May 2009	May 2009	May 2009	Dec 2012	
Vodafone	New Zealand	Aug 2005	Feb 2009	N/A	Aug 2005	Dec 2010	Dec 2010	
Ufone	Pakistan	May 2014	Jan 2017	N/A	May 2014	May 2014		
AIS	Thailand	Apr 2013	May 2008 - Sep 2013	No	May 2008	Jul 2011		HSPA+
DTAC	Thailand	May 2013	No	Aug 2011 - Dec 2018	Aug 2011	Aug 2011	Aug 2011	DC-HSDPA
MY	Thailand	No	No	Jan 2012	Jan 2012			HSPA

== See also ==
- UMTS
- UMTS frequency bands
- List of LTE networks
- List of CDMA2000 networks
