= List of 5G NR networks =

This is a list of commercial 5G NR networks around the globe, showing their frequency bands.

== Commercial deployments ==
Notes

1. This list of network deployments does not imply widespread deployment or national coverage.
2. The deployed bandwidth is listed for the respective band.

Legend	Commercial standalone (SA) service	Commercial non-standalone (NSA) service	Pre-commercial standalone (SA) service	Pre-commercial non-standalone (NSA) service	Unused spectrum

=== Africa ===
Country or territory	Operator	Bands							Notes
Country or territory	Operator	DSS	n28 700 MHz	n40 2.3 GHz	n41 2.5 GHz	n78 3.5 GHz	n257 28 GHz	Others	Notes
Algeria	Djezzy							n? (Nov 2022)	
Algeria	Mobilis							n? (Nov 2018)	
Angola	Africell							n? (Jul 2022)	
Angola	Unitel					? MHz (Aug 2022)			FWA
Benin	MTN							n? (Nov 2024)	
Botswana	Mascom							n? (Feb 2022)	
Botswana	Orange							n? (Nov 2022)	Also FWA
Congo	MTN							n? (Oct 2022)	
Democratic Republic of Congo	Orange							n? (Jun 2023)	
Egypt	e&				80 MHz (Jun 2025)				
Egypt	Orange				30 MHz (Jun 2025)				
Egypt	Telecom Egypt				80 MHz (Jun 2025)				
Egypt	Vodafone				80 MHz (Jun 2025)				
Ethiopia	Ethio telecom							n? (Sep 2023)	
Gabon	Gabon Telecom					? MHz (Nov 2019)			
Gambia	Qcell							n? (Jun 2023)	Also FWA
Guinea	Guinée Télécom							n? (May 2023)	
Ivory Coast	MTN							n? (Dec 2021)	
Ivory Coast	Orange							n? (Sep 2022)	
Kenya	Airtel				60 MHz (Jul 2023)				
Kenya	Safaricom				60 MHz (Oct 2022)				Also FWA
Lesotho	Vodacom					100 MHz (Aug 2018)			FWA
Libya	Al-madar							n? (Oct 2019)	
Madagascar	Telma					? MHz (Jun 2020)			
Malawi	TNM					? MHz		n77	
Mali	Orange							n? (Jul 2021)	
Mauritania	Mattel							n? (Nov 2023)	
Mauritius	Emtel				100 MHz (Aug 2022)				Also FWA
Mauritius	Mauritius Telecom					100 MHz (Jul 2021)			
Morocco	Inwi		10 MHz (Nov 2025)			50 MHz (Nov 2025)			
Morocco	Maroc Telecom	n1: 15 MHz (Nov 2025)	10 MHz (Nov 2025)			100 MHz (Nov 2025)			
Morocco	Orange		10 MHz (Nov 2025)			50 MHz (Nov 2025)			
Mozambique	Tmcell							n? (Mar 2022)	
Mozambique	Vodacom							n? (May 2023)	
Nigeria	Airtel					100 MHz (Jun 2023)			
Nigeria	MCOM					100 MHz (Jan 2023)			
Nigeria	MTN					100 MHz (Sep 2022)			
Reunion	Orange					100 MHz (Jun 2022)			
Rwanda	MTN							n? (Jun 2025)	
Senegal	Free		10 MHz			90 MHz		n? (Jun 2022)	
Seychelles	C&W							n? (Jun 2020)	
Sierra Leone	Orange							n? (Oct 2023)	
Somalia	Hormuud Telecom							n? (Mar 2024)	
Somalia	Somtel							n? (Jan 2024)	
Somalia	Telesom							n? (Jan 2024)	Also FWA
South Africa	MTN	n1: 15 MHz n3: 10 MHz (Jun 2020)	10 MHz (Jun 2020)			50 MHz (Jun 2020)	? MHz^{†} (Jun 2020)		^{†} FWA
South Africa	Rain				50 MHz (Sep 2019)				FWA
South Africa	Telkom					40 MHz (Nov 2022)			FWA
South Africa	Vodacom		10 MHz (Dec 2020)			50 MHz (Sep 2019)			Also FWA
Tanzania	Airtel					80 MHz		n? (Aug 2023) n7: 30 MHz^{†}	Also FWA^{†} 15+15 MHz
Tanzania	Tigo					80 MHz		n? (Feb 2023)	
Tanzania	Vodacom		10 MHz	70 MHz				n? (Sep 2022) n38: 20 MHz	Also FWA
Togo	Togocom							n? (Nov 2020)	
Tunisia	Tunisie Telecom							n? (Nov 2022)	
Uganda	Airtel					100 MHz		n? (Jul 2023) n20: 10 MHz	Also FWA
Uganda	MTN		10 MHz	100 MHz				n? (Jul 2023) n7: 10 MHz	
Zambia	Airtel				50 MHz (Jul 2023)				Also FWA
Zambia	MTN				50 MHz (Jul 2023)				Also FWA
Zimbabwe	Econet							n? (Feb 2022)	

=== Americas ===
Country or territory	Operator	Bands							Notes
Country or territory	Operator	DSS	n28 700 MHz	n40 2.3 GHz	n41 2.5 GHz	n78 3.5 GHz	n258 26 GHz	Others	Notes
Argentina	Claro					100 MHz			
Argentina	Movistar					50 MHz (Oct 2024)			
Argentina	Personal	n7: 20 MHz n28: 10 MHz (Jan 2021)				100 MHz (Nov 2023)			
Barbados	FLOW							n? (Oct 2025)	
Barbados	Digicel							n? (Nov 2025)	
Bermuda	One					200 MHz (Dec 2023)			
Bermuda	Digicel					100 MHz (Jul 2025)			
Bermuda	Paradise Mobile					100 MHz (May 2023)			
Bolivia	Entel					50 MHz (Jul 2025)			
Brazil	Algar			20–40 MHz (Dec 2021)		80 MHz	1000 MHz		Also FWA
Brazil	Brisanet		10 MHz	90 MHz (Aug 2023)		80–100 MHz (Jun 2024)		n38: 15–50 MHz	Also FWA
Brazil	Claro	n7: 20–30 MHz (Jun 2020)		50 MHz (Dec 2021) (Note: Non-standalone mode) (Aug 2023) (Note: Standalone mode)		100 MHz (Jul 2022)	400 MHz		Also FWA
Brazil	iez! (Cloud2U)		10 MHz			80 MHz (Feb 2023)			FWA
Brazil	TIM	n3: 15–20 MHz n7: 20–30 MHz n28: 10 MHz (Dec 2020)		40 MHz (Mar 2022)		100 MHz (Jul 2022)	200–600 MHz		Also FWA
Brazil	Unifique	n28: 5–20 MHz	5–20 MHz (Jun 2024)			80 MHz (Nov 2023)			
Brazil	Veloso NET	n28: 10 MHz (Jan 2023)						n38 (Jan 2023)	FWA
Brazil	Vivo	n3: 5 MHz n7: 20–30 MHz n28: 10–20 MHz (Jul 2020)		40–50 MHz (Dec 2021)		100 MHz (Jul 2022)	600 MHz		Also FWA
Canada	Bell					20–80 MHz (Jun 2022) (Nov 2022) 10–100 MHz		n66: 10–30 MHz (Jun 2020) (Nov 2022) n25: 10–15 MHz (Jan 2025) (Jan 2025) n5: 5 MHz (Jun 2020) (Nov 2022) n71: 10 MHz (Jun 2020) (Nov 2022) n77: 10–20 MHz (May 2024)	Also FWA^{†} RAN-sharing with Telus
Canada	Eastlink					10–150 MHz		n71: 10 MHz (Feb 2022) n77: 20–90 MHz	
Canada	Freedom Mobile / Vidéotron					10–130 MHz		n66: 20 MHz (Dec 2020) n71: 10–15 MHz (July 2023) n77: 10–90 MHz	
Canada	Rogers	n66: 20–40 MHz n71: 10–20 MHz (Oct 2020) (Mar 2022)			20 MHz (Jan 2020) (Mar 2022)	30–90 MHz (Jun 2022) 10–80 MHz		n77: 10–100 MHz	
Canada	SaskTel					50–120 MHz 50 MHz		n66: 10 MHz (Dec 2021)	
Canada	Telus					10–80 MHz (Jun 2022) (Jan 2024) 10–100 MHz		n66: 10–30 MHz (Jun 2020) (Jan 2024) n25: 10–15 MHz (Jan 2025) (Jan 2025) n71: 10 MHz (Jun 2020) (Jan 2024) n5: 5 MHz (Jun 2020) (Jan 2024) n77: 20–100 MHz	Also FWA^{†} RAN-sharing with Bell
Canada	Xplornet					20–110 MHz		n? (Sep 2021)	FWA
Cayman Islands	FLOW					200 MHz (Jun 2024)			
Cayman Islands	Digicel					250 MHz (Jun 2024)			
Cayman Islands	Paradise Mobile					100 MHz (Nov 2024)			
Chile	Claro					50 MHz^{†} (Apr 2023) 50 MHz	400 MHz		FWA^{†}10+10+15+15 MHz
Chile	Entel					100 MHz^{†} (Dec 2021)	400 MHz		Also FWA^{†}25+25+50 MHz
Chile	Movistar					50 MHz (Dec 2021)			
Chile	WOM					50 MHz (Mar 2022)	400 MHz		
Colombia	Claro					80 MHz			
Colombia	DirecTV							n38: 40 MHz (Sep 2020)	FWA
Colombia	Movistar					80 MHz			RAN-sharing with Tigo
Colombia	Tigo					80 MHz			RAN-sharing with Movistar
Dominican Republic	Altice					100 MHz (Mar 2022)			
Dominican Republic	Claro					70 MHz (Dec 2021)			
Ecuador	CNT							n? (Apr 2021)	
Greenland	Tusass							n? (Oct 2022)	FWA
Guatemala	Claro		20 MHz			50 MHz^{†} (Jul 2022)		n7: 25 MHz	^{†}25+25 MHz
Guatemala	Tigo		10 MHz			75 MHz (Jul 2022)		n7: 45 MHz n38: 15.8 MHz	
Jamaica	FLOW							n? (Jun 2026) n71: 20 MHz	
Mexico	AT&T					50 MHz		n7: 20 MHz^{†} (Dec 2021)	^{†} RAN-sharing with Movistar
Mexico	Movistar							n7: 20 MHz^{†} (Dec 2022)	^{†} RAN-sharing with AT&T
Mexico	Telcel					100 MHz (Feb 2022)			
Peru	Claro					50 MHz^{†} (Mar 2021)			Also FWA^{†}25+25 MHz
Peru	Entel					100 MHz^{†} (Mar 2020)			Also FWA^{†}25+25+25+25 MHz
Peru	Movistar					50 MHz^{†} (Jul 2021)			^{†}25+25 MHz
Puerto Rico; US Virgin Islands	Aeronet							n48: 10–30 MHz (Sep 2021)	FWA
Puerto Rico; US Virgin Islands	Claro				40 MHz (?)			n66: 15 MHz (?) n261: 850 MHz (Nov 2023)	
Puerto Rico; US Virgin Islands	Liberty						200–300 MHz	n5: 10 MHz (Jun 2020) n71: 5–10 MHz (Jul 2025) n260: 400 MHz	
Puerto Rico; US Virgin Islands	T-Mobile				20–100 MHz (Apr 2020) (Nov 2022)		400–500 MHz (Sep 2021) (Dec 2023)^{‡}	n25: 10–25 MHz^{§} (Oct 2022) n66: 15 MHz (Jun 2026) n71: 5–20 MHz (Dec 2019) (Aug 2020) n260: 1200 MHz n262: 500 MHz	Also FWA; VoNR^{‡}Available via NR-DC.
Saint-Martin	Orange					? MHz			
Suriname	Telesur							n77 (Nov 2020)	Also FWA
Trinidad and Tobago	bmobile				50 MHz (Dec 2019)				FWA
United States	AT&T							n2: 5 MHz n5: 5–10 MHz n66: 5–20 MHz (Dec 2019) (Oct 2022) n77: 120–140 MHz^{†} (Jan 2022) (Oct 2022) n260: 100–1800 MHz (Dec 2018) n261: 400–800 MHz	Also partially available to FirstNet^{†} 40+(80–100) MHz
United States	C Spire				50–118 MHz^{†}			n2: 5–20 MHz n12: 5–10 MHz n71: 5–10 MHz (Oct 2020) n77: 40 MHz	^{†} Up to 100+17.5 MHz
United States	Cellcom						100 MHz	n5 n71: 5–10 MHz (Feb 2022) n77: 20–40 MHz n261: 850 MHz	
United States	GCI						200–500 MHz	n71: 5–10 MHz (Apr 2020) n260: 200 MHz n262: 200 MHz	Also FWA
United States	Nex-Tech							n71: 10 MHz (Dec 2021)	
United States	T-Mobile				40–190 MHz (Apr 2020) (Nov 2022)		100–700 MHz (Sep 2021) (Dec 2023)^{‡}	n25: 5–45 MHz^{§} (Oct 2022) n66: 5–30 MHz (Oct 2025) n71: 10–30 MHz (Dec 2019) (Aug 2020) n261: 50–850 MHz (Jun 2019) (Dec 2023)^{‡} n77: 30–80 MHz^{†} n262: 100–500 MHz	World's first 5G NR SA deployment (Aug 2020); Also FWA; VoNR^{†} (10–40)+(20–60) MHz^{‡} Pre-commercial^{§} NTN: 5 MHz (Nov 2024)^{‡}Available via NR-DC.
United States	Verizon						100–400 MHz	n2: 10–15 MHz n5: 10 MHz n66: 5–30 MHz (Oct 2020) (Nov 2023) n48: 10–40 MHz^{†} (Sep 2025) n77: 140–200 MHz^{‡} (Jan 2022) (Nov 2023) n260: 700–1700 MHz^{‡} (Oct 2020) n261: 100–850 MHz^{‡} (Oct 2019)	^{‡} Also FWA^{†}CBRS PAL Licenses
Uruguay	ANTEL					100 MHz (Jun 2023)		n257: 850 MHz (Apr 2019)	FWA
Uruguay	Claro					100 MHz			
Uruguay	Movistar					100 MHz (Sep 2023)			

=== Asia ===
Country or territory	Operator	Bands									Notes	
Country or territory	Operator	DSS	n28 700 MHz	n40 2.3 GHz	n41 2.5 GHz	n78 3.5 GHz	n79 4.9 GHz	n257 28 GHz	n258 26 GHz	Others	Notes	
Armenia	MTS									n20: 10 MHz (Jun 2023)		
Azerbaijan	Azercell									n? (Dec 2022)		
Azerbaijan	Azerfon (Nar)									n? (May 2023)		
Azerbaijan	Bakcell									n? (Feb 2023)		
Bahrain	Batelco				50 MHz	100 MHz (Jun 2019)						
Bahrain	stc				40 MHz	100 MHz (Jun 2019) (May 2022)					Also FWA	
Bahrain	Zain				50 MHz	100 MHz (Jun 2020)						
Bangladesh	GP									n? (Sep 2025)		
Bangladesh	Robi									n? (Sep 2025)		
Bangladesh	Teletalk			30 MHz		60 MHz (Dec 2021)						
Bhutan	Bhutan Telecom									n? (Dec 2021)		
Bhutan	Tashicell					? MHz (Dec 2021)						
Brunei	UNN	n3: 20 MHz (Jan 2026)	20 MHz (Jan 2026)			100 MHz (Jan 2026)						
Cambodia	Smart									n? (Jul 2019)		
China	China Broadnet		30 MHz^{†} (Jun 2022)		100 MHz^{†} (Oct 2019)	100 MHz^{‡} (Oct 2019)	100 MHz (Jun 2022)				^{†} RAN-sharing with China Mobile^{‡} RAN-sharing with China Telecom and China Unicom for indoor coverage	
China	China Mobile		30 MHz^{†} (Apr 2022)		100 MHz^{†} (Oct 2019)		60 MHz (Apr 2022)				^{†} RAN-sharing with China Broadnet	
China	China Telecom	n1: 20 MHz (Nov 2023) n5: 10 MHz (Aug 2023)				200 MHz^{‡} (Oct 2019) (Nov 2022)					^{‡} 100 MHz RAN-sharing with China Broadnet and China Unicom for indoor coverage	
China	China Unicom	n1: 20 MHz n8: 10 MHz (Nov 2022) (Nov 2022)				200 MHz^{‡} (Oct 2019) (Nov 2022)					^{‡} 100 MHz RAN-sharing with China Broadnet and China Telecom for indoor coverage.	
Cyprus	Cytamobile-Vodafone		10 MHz (Jan 2021)			100 MHz (Jan 2021)						
Georgia	Cellfie		5 MHz (Nov 2023)			50 MHz (Nov 2023)						
Georgia	MagtiCom					100 MHz				n? (Aug 2020)		
Georgia	Silknet									n? (Dec 2023)		
Hong Kong	3		10 MHz (Jul 2022)	20 MHz		70 MHz^{†} (Apr 2020)		600 MHz		n1: 15 MHz (Apr 2020)	^{†} 30 (Indoor)+40 MHz	
Hong Kong	China Mobile		10 MHz (Jul 2022)	50 MHz		80 MHz^{†} (Apr 2020) (Nov 2020)	80 MHz (Apr 2020) (Nov 2020)	600 MHz (Sep 2023)		n104: 100 MHz	Also FWA^{†} 20 (Indoor)+60 MHz	
Hong Kong	HKT		10 MHz	20 MHz		80 MHz^{†} (Apr 2020)	40 MHz (Apr 2020)	600 MHz		n1: 10 MHz n104: 100 MHz	^{†} 30 (Indoor)+50 MHz; *SA/NSA dual mode. *SA: relevant service plan & replace SA SIM needed to use SA network	
Hong Kong	SmarTone		5 MHz ?			70 MHz^{†} (Apr 2020)	40 MHz (Apr 2020)	600 MHz		n5: 10 MHz (Apr 2020) n104: 100 MHz	Also FWA^{†} 20 (Indoor)+50 MHz	
India	Airtel					100 MHz (Oct 2022)			800 MHz (Aug 2023)	n1: 5–10 MHz n3: 3–10 MHz n40: 10–20 MHz (Jul 2024)	Also FWA	
India	Jio		10 MHz (Oct 2022)			100–130 MHz (Oct 2022)			1000 MHz (Oct 2022)		Also FWA; VoNR	
India	Vi					50 MHz (Mar 2025)			200–800 MHz (Jan 2025)			
Indonesia	Indosat Ooredoo Hutchison		20 MHz^{†} (Jul 2026)		60 MHz (Jul 2026)					n1: 15 MHz (Jun 2021)	^{†} 2x10 MHz	
Indonesia	Telkomsel		20 MHz^{†} (Jul 2026)	30 MHz (Jun 2021)	80 MHz (Jul 2026)			? MHz (Aug 2018)		n1: 20 MHz (Jun 2021)	Also FWA^{†} 2x10 MHz	
Indonesia	XLSmart		30 MHz^{†} (Jul 2026)	40 MHz (Dec 2025)	50 MHz (Jul 2026)			? MHz (Aug 2018)			^{†} 2x15 MHz	
Iran	MCI					100 MHz (Mar 2021)						
Iran	MTN Irancell					100 MHz (Feb 2021)						
Israel	Cellcom		10 MHz			100 MHz (Oct 2020)						
Israel	HOT		10 MHz^{†}			100 MHz^{†} (Sep 2020)					^{†} RAN-sharing with Partner	
Israel	Partner		10 MHz^{†}			100 MHz^{†} (Sep 2020)					^{†} RAN-sharing with HOT	
Israel	Pelephone		10 MHz			100 MHz (Sep 2020)						
Japan	au		10 MHz (Mar 2021)			140 MHz^{†} (Mar 2020)		400 MHz (Sep 2020)		n77: 100 MHz (Mar 2020) n? (Feb 2022)	^{†} 100+40 MHz	
Japan	NTT Docomo					180 MHz^{†} (Dec 2020) (Dec 2021)	100 MHz (Oct 2020) (Dec 2021)	400 MHz (Sep 2020) (Dec 2021)			World's first 5G NR CA deployment (Dec 2020); CA of 200 MHz^{†} 100+80 MHz	
Japan	Rakuten Mobile							400 MHz		n77: 100 MHz (Sep 2020)		
Japan	Softbank					80 MHz^{†}		400 MHz (Mar 2021) (Oct 2021)		n77: 100 MHz^{‡} (Mar 2020) (Oct 2021)	^{†} 40+40 MHz^{‡} Also FWA	
Jordan	Orange									n? (Jul 2023)	Also FWA	
Kazakhstan	Kcell	n? (Dec 2021)				100 MHz (Sep 2023)						
Kazakhstan	Tele2					100 MHz (Sep 2023)					Also FWA	
Kuwait	Ooredoo					100 MHz (Jun 2019)						
Kuwait	stc	n1: 10 MHz (Aug 2020) (May 2021)				100 MHz (Jun 2019) (May 2021)						
Kuwait	Zain			? MHz (Oct 2022)		100 MHz (Jun 2019) (May 2022)					VoNR	
Kyrgyzstan	MegaCom									n? (Aug 2022)		
Kyrgyzstan	O!									n? (Aug 2022)		
Laos	LaoTel									n? (Sep 2020)		
Lebanon	touch									n? (Nov 2022)		
Macau	China Telecom									n? (Jan 2023)		
Macau	CTM					100 MHz (Nov 2022)						
Malaysia	DNB		20 MHz^{†} (Dec 2021)			200 MHz^{†} (Dec 2021)		1600 MHz^{†} (Dec 2021)			^{†}RAN-sharing with CelcomDigi (Oct 2022), Maxis (Aug 2023), TM (Nov 2022), U Mobile (Nov 2022), Yes (May 2022). U Mobile would cease leasing bandwidth from DNB and start using its own network in 2026	
Malaysia	U Mobile	n28 (Mar 2025)	2*20 MHz (Mar 2025)			100 MHz (Mar 2025)						
Maldives	Dhiraagu					? MHz (Aug 2019)						
Maldives	Ooredoo							n? (Dec 2020)				
Myanmar	Mytel									n? (Aug 2019)		
Nepal	Nepal Telecom				60 MHz							
Oman	Omantel					100 MHz (Dec 2019)					Also FWA	
Oman	Ooredoo					100 MHz (May 2020)					Also FWA	
Oman	Vodafone	n3: 20 MHz n7: 20 MHz (Mar 2022)	10 MHz (Dec 2021)			100 MHz						
Pakistan	Jazz		20 MHz (Mar 2026)	50 MHz (Mar 2026)	70 MHz (Mar 2026)	50 MHz (Mar 2026)						
Pakistan	Ufone				60 MHz (Mar 2026)	120 MHz (Mar 2026)						
Pakistan	Zong				60 MHz (Mar 2026)	50 MHz (Mar 2026)						
Philippines	DITO					140 MHz^{†} (Mar 2021)					Also FWA^{†} 100+40 MHz	
Philippines	Globe					60 MHz (Jun 2019) (Dec 2022)					Also FWA	
Philippines	Now Telecom									n? (Nov 2022)		
Philippines	Smart					60 MHz (Jul 2020) (Oct 2021)						
Qatar	Ooredoo					100 MHz (May 2018) (Jul 2023)^{†}					World's first 5G NR deployment (May 2018)^{†} Pre-commercial	
Qatar	Vodafone					100 MHz (Aug 2019)						
Saudi Arabia	Mobily		10 MHz	N/A	80 MHz^{‡}	100 MHz 100 MHz					Also FWA^{‡} Additional 20 MHz used for TD-LTE	
Saudi Arabia	stc			60 MHz^{‡}	N/A	100 MHz (Jun 2019) 100 MHz				n71: 20 MHz	Also FWA^{‡} Additional 40 MHz used for TD-LTE	
Saudi Arabia	Zain			N/A	70 MHz^{‡} (Jun 2019) (Feb 2022)	100 MHz (Jun 2019) (Feb 2022)				n71: 15 MHz	Also FWA^{‡} Additional 20 MHz used for TD-LTE	
Singapore	M1		5 MHz			100 MHz^{†} (Jul 2021)		800 MHz		n1: 15 MHz (Nov 2021)	World's first 5G VoNR deployment (Jul 2021)^{†} RAN-sharing with StarHub	
Singapore	Simba			40 MHz				400 MHz (Dec 2022)	400 MHz (Dec 2022)	n1: 10 MHz		
Singapore	Singtel		20 MHz (Feb 2025)			100 MHz (Sep 2020) (May 2021)		800 MHz (Dec 2020) (May 2021)		n1: 20 MHz (Nov 2021)		
Singapore	StarHub		10 MHz			100 MHz^{†} (Aug 2021)		800 MHz		n1: 15 MHz (Nov 2021)	^{†} RAN-sharing with M1	
South Korea	LG U+					100 MHz (Dec 2018)					World's first 5G NR commercial service (Dec 2018)	
South Korea	KT					100 MHz (Dec 2018) (Jul 2021)					World's first 5G NR commercial service (Dec 2018)	
South Korea	SK Telecom					100 MHz (Dec 2018)					World's first 5G NR commercial service (Dec 2018)	
Sri Lanka	Airtel					? MHz (Feb 2022)						
Sri Lanka	Dialog					200 MHz (Dec 2025)						
Sri Lanka	Hutch					? MHz (Mar 2021)						
Sri Lanka	SLTMobitel					? MHz (Jun 2022)						
Taiwan	Asia Pacific Telecom					80 MHz^{†} (Aug 2021)		400 MHz (Oct 2020)			^{†} RAN-sharing with FET	
Taiwan	Chunghwa Telecom	n1: 20 MHz (Jul 2020)				90 MHz (Jul 2020)		600 MHz				
Taiwan	FET	n1: 15 MHz (Feb 2020)				80 MHz^{†} (Feb 2020) (Jan 2023)		400 MHz			^{†} RAN-sharing with Asia Pacific Telecom	
Taiwan	Taiwan Mobile					60 MHz (Jul 2020)		200 MHz				
Taiwan	Taiwan Star					40 MHz (Aug 2020)						
Tajikistan	MegaFon									n? (Feb 2020)		
Tajikistan	Tcell					? MHz (Aug 2020)						
Tajikistan	ZET-Mobile (Beeline)					? MHz (May 2021)						
Thailand	AIS		20 MHz (Sep 2023)		100 MHz (Feb 2020) (Jul 2020)				1200 MHz (Feb 2020) (Jul 2020)			
Thailand	True				90 MHz (March 2020)				800 MHz			
Turkmenistan	Türkmenaragatnaşyk									n? (Jun 2025)		
United Arab Emirates	Du				100 MHz (Aug 2023)	100 MHz (May 2019)			400 MHz (Apr 2022)		Also FWA	
United Arab Emirates	Etisalat				90 MHz	100 MHz (May 2020) (Feb 2023)					Also FWA	
Uzbekistan	Mobiuz									n? (Oct 2022)		
Uzbekistan	Ucell					? MHz (Apr 2021)						
Uzbekistan	Uzbektelecom					? MHz (Mar 2023)						
Vietnam	MobiFone									n3: 10 MHz n7: 10 MHz (Aug 2022) n77: 100 MHz		
Vietnam	Viettel		20 MHz (May 2025)		100 MHz (Oct 2024)	100 MHz (Nov 2020)		400–1000 MHz (Nov 2020)		n38: 40 MHz (Nov 2020)	n8: 10 MHz n7: 10 MHz (Sep 2026)	Also FWA

=== Europe ===
Country or territory	Operator	Bands							Notes
Country or territory	Operator	DSS	n28 700 MHz	n40 2.3 GHz	n78 3.5 GHz	n257 28 GHz	n258 26 GHz	Others	Notes
Andorra	Andorra Telecom				200 MHz			n? (Dec 2021)	
Austria	A1				100–160 MHz (Jan 2020)		400 MHz	n1: 20 MHz (Mar 2021) n75: 30 MHz	
Austria	Drei		10 MHz (Sep 2022)		100 MHz (Aug 2019)		600 MHz	n75: 30 MHz (Sep 2022)	Also FWA
Austria	Magenta	n1: 15 MHz (Jul 2020)	20 MHz (May 2021)		110–170 MHz (Mar 2019)		400 MHz	n75: 25 MHz n76: 5 MHz	
Belarus	A1				100 MHz (May 2020)				
Belarus	MTS				100 MHz (Jun 2020)			n3: 15 MHz (Jun 2020)	
Belgium	BASE		5 MHz		100 MHz (Dec 2021)			n50: 15 MHz	Also FWA
Belgium	Orange		10 MHz		100 MHz (Feb 2022) (Sep 2022)			n50: 25 MHz n51: 5 MHz	
Belgium	Proximus	n1: 10 MHz (Apr 2020)	10 MHz		120 MHz^{†} (Dec 2020)			n50: 45 MHz	^{†} 100+20 MHz
Bosnia and Herzegovina	BH Telecom							n? (May 2020)	
Bosnia and Herzegovina	HT							n? (Apr 2022)	
Bulgaria	A1		10 MHz		120 MHz^{†} (Nov 2020) (Oct 2022)			n20: 10 MHz	^{†} 100+20 MHz
Bulgaria	Vivacom	n3: 20 MHz (Sep 2020)	10 MHz		100 MHz (Aug 2021)			n20: 10 MHz	
Bulgaria	Yettel	n7: 20 MHz	10 MHz		100 MHz (Jun 2021)			n20: 10 MHz	
Croatia	A1		10 MHz (Aug 2021)		100 MHz (Aug 2021)		200 MHz		Also FWA
Croatia	HT	n1: 15 MHz (Oct 2020)	10 MHz (Aug 2021)		120 MHz (Aug 2021)		400 MHz		
Croatia	Telemach		10 MHz		100 MHz (Jun 2022)		200 MHz		
Czechia	Nordic Telecom				100 MHz (Nov 2019)				
Czechia	O_{2}	n1: 20 MHz n3: 28 MHz	10 MHz			? MHz (Jun 2022)		n77: 60 MHz (Dec 2020)	
Czechia	T-Mobile	n1: 15 MHz n3: 20 MHz (Nov 2020)	10 MHz (Sep 2021)		140 MHz				
Czechia	Vodafone	n1: 20 MHz n3: 20 MHz (Mar 2021)	10 MHz (May 2022)		100 MHz (May 2022)				
Denmark	3	n1: 15 MHz (2022)			120 MHz (Dec 2021)		1000 MHz		
Denmark	TDC (YouSee)		15 MHz (Dec 2020) (Aug 2023)	100 MHz	120–130 MHz (Sep 2020) (Aug 2023)	1250 MHz		n75: 40 MHz n76: 5 MHz	
Denmark	TT-Netværket (Telenor, Telia)				140 MHz (Jun 2021)		600 MHz	n3: 5 MHz (Aug 2021) n75: 45 MHz	
Estonia	Elisa		10 MHz (Jan 2023)		70 MHz (Jun 2022)		400 MHz		
Estonia	Tele2	n40: 60 MHz (Jul 2022)	10 MHz	60 MHz	60 MHz		400 MHz (May 2023)		
Estonia	Telia	n1: 15 MHz (Nov 2020) n28: 10 MHz			60 MHz (Jul 2022)		400 MHz		Also FWA
Faroe Islands	Faroese Telecom							n? (Apr 2024)	
Finland	DNA		10 MHz (Jun 2022)		130 MHz (Jan 2020)		800 MHz		
Finland	Elisa	n1: 20 MHz	10 MHz		130 MHz (Jun 2019) (Dec 2023)		800 MHz		Also FWA
Finland	Telia		10 MHz		130 MHz (Oct 2019) (Nov 2021)		800 MHz		Also FWA
France	Bouygues	n1: 15 MHz (Dec 2020)			70 MHz (Dec 2020)				
France	Free	n28: 10 MHz (Dec 2020)			70 MHz (Dec 2020) (Sep 2024)				
France	Orange	n1: 15 MHz (Dec 2020)			90 MHz (Dec 2020) (Mar 2025)				
France	SFR	n1: 15 MHz (Nov 2020)			80 MHz (Nov 2020)				
Germany	1&1				50 MHz (Jan 2023)				Also FWA
Germany	Telefónica (O_{2})	n3: 20 MHz (Dec 2021) (Oct 2023)	10 MHz (Sep 2021) (Oct 2023)		70 MHz (Oct 2020) (Oct 2023)				VoNR
Germany	Telekom	n1: 20 MHz (Jun 2020) (Sep 2023^{‡})	10 MHz (Jun 2022)		90 MHz (Sep 2019) (Apr 2022^{‡})				^{‡} Pre-commercial
Germany	Vodafone	n3: 20 MHz (Jul 2020) (Apr 2021) n28: 10 MHz (Apr 2020) (Apr 2021)			90 MHz (Jul 2019) (Apr 2021)				VoNR
Greece	COSMOTE	n1: 20 MHz n3: 35 MHz	10 MHz		75 MHz (Dec 2020)				
Greece	NOVA	n1: 20 MHz (Dec 2020)	10 MHz		50 MHz (Dec 2020)				Also FWA
Greece	Vodafone		10 MHz		70 MHz (Jan 2021)				
Hungary	Telekom	n1: 20 MHz (Nov 2020)	10 MHz (Nov 2021)		120 MHz (Apr 2020)				
Hungary	Vodafone	n1: 15 MHz n28: 10 MHz			130 MHz (Oct 2019)				
Hungary	Yettel	n1: 10 MHz			140 MHz (Nov 2021) (Nov 2023)				Also FWA
Iceland	Nova				100 MHz (May 2020)		? MHz (May 2024)		
Iceland	Síminn				100 MHz (Sep 2021)				
Iceland	Sýn				100 MHz (Sep 2020)				
Ireland	3		10 MHz		100 MHz (Sep 2020) (Jan 2024)			n3: 15 MHz (?) (Dec 2023)	Also FWA
Ireland	Eir	n3: 15 MHz	10 MHz	60 MHz	80–85 MHz (Oct 2019)				
Ireland	Vodafone	n1: 20 MHz	10 MHz		85–105 MHz (Aug 2019)			n38: 30 MHz	
Italy	Eolo						200 MHz (Dec 2024)		FWA
Italy	Fastweb				20–40 MHz (Aug 2022)		200 MHz (Dec 2020)		FWA
Italy	Iliad	n28: 10 MHz			20 MHz (Dec 2020)		200 MHz		
Italy	OpNet				20–60 MHz (Nov 2022)		200 MHz (Dec 2020) (Nov 2022)		FWA
Italy	TIM	n1: 15 MHz n28: 10 MHz	10 MHz		100 MHz^{†} (Jul 2019)		200 MHz (Jan 2020)		^{†} 80+20 MHz
Italy	Vodafone	n1: 15 MHz n28: 10 MHz			80 MHz (Dec 2018)		200 MHz		Also FWA
Italy	WINDTRE	n3: 20 MHz n7: 20 MHz (Jan 2021)			60 MHz (Dec 2020)		200 MHz	n38: 20 MHz	Also FWA
Latvia	Bite		10 MHz		150 MHz^{†} (Jan 2021)			n50: 20 MHz	^{†} 50+50+50 MHz
Latvia	LMT		10 MHz		100 MHz^{†‡} (Sep 2021)			n50: 20 MHz n67: 10 MHz	^{†} 50+50 MHz^{‡} Also FWA
Latvia	Tele2		10 MHz		100 MHz (Jan 2020) (Feb 2022)			n50: 20 MHz n67: 10 MHz	Also FWA
Lithuania	Bitė		5 MHz	80 MHz (Feb 2022)	100 MHz				Also FWA
Lithuania	Tele2		5 MHz (Oct 2022)		100 MHz (Oct 2022)				
Lithuania	Telia	n1: 20 MHz (Jan 2021)	10 MHz (Oct 2022) (Dec 2025)		100 MHz (Oct 2022) (Dec 2025)				
Luxembourg	Orange		10 MHz (Nov 2020)		110 MHz (Nov 2020)				
Luxembourg	Post		10 MHz (Oct 2020)		110 MHz (Oct 2020)				
Luxembourg	Tango		10 MHz (Oct 2020)		100 MHz (Oct 2020)				
North Macedonia	Telekom	n1: 20 MHz (Feb 2022)	10 MHz (Jul 2022)		100 MHz (Jul 2022)				
Malta	Epic				100 MHz (Nov 2021)				
Malta	GO				100 MHz (Dec 2021)				
Malta	Melita				100 MHz (May 2021)				
Monaco	Monaco Telecom				100 MHz (Jul 2019)				
Montenegro	CT	n1: 20 MHz (Aug 2022)	10 MHz		140 MHz (Apr 2023)				
Montenegro	One		10 MHz		120 MHz			n? (Aug 2022)	
Netherlands	KPN		10 MHz (Jul 2020)		100 MHz			n1: 20 MHz	
Netherlands	Odido		10 MHz (Jul 2020)		100 MHz			n1: 20 MHz	
Netherlands	Vodafone	n3: 20 MHz (Apr 2020)	10 MHz		100 MHz				
Norway	ice	n1: 20 MHz n28: 10 MHz (Nov 2021)			80 MHz				
Norway	Telenor				120 MHz (Mar 2020)		400 MHz (Nov 2018)		Also FWA
Norway	Telia	n28: 10 MHz (May 2020)			100 MHz (Oct 2020)				Also FWA
Poland	Orange	n1: 15 MHz (Jul 2020)	10 MHz		100 MHz (Jan 2024)				
Poland	Play	n1: 15 MHz (Dec 2019)	10 MHz		100 MHz (Jan 2024)				Also FWA
Poland	Plus	n1: 15 Mhz	5 MHz		100 MHz (Jun 2026)			n38: 50 MHz (May 2020)	Also FWA
Poland	T-Mobile	n1: 15 MHz (Jun 2020)	5 MHz		100 MHz (Jan 2024)			n7 (Nov 2021)	
Portugal	MEO	n1: 20 MHz n3: 20 MHz	5 MHz (Jan 2022)		90 MHz (Jan 2022)				
Portugal	NOS		10 MHz (Nov 2023)		100 MHz (Nov 2021) (Nov 2023)				
Portugal	Vodafone		10 MHz		90 MHz (Dec 2021)				
Romania	Digi	n38: 40 MHz (Jun 2019)			50 MHz (Jun 2019)				
Romania	Orange		10 MHz		100 MHz (Nov 2019)				Also FWA
Romania	Telekom	n1: 15 MHz (Apr 2023)							
Romania	Vodafone	n1: 15 MHz	5 MHz		40 MHz (Jun 2019)				
Russia	Beeline							n79: 90 MHz (Sep 2026)	FWA
Russia	MegaFon	n1: 15 MHz n7: 10 MHz (May 2021)						n79: 90 MHz (Sep 2026)	
Russia	MTS	n1: 15 MHz n7: 15 MHz (Dec 2020)						n79: 90 MHz (Mar 2021)	
Russia	T2							n79: 90 MHz (May 2018)	
San Marino	TIM				? MHz (Dec 2018)		? MHz (Dec 2018)		
Serbia	A1		10 MHz		100 MHz 30 MHz				
Serbia	mts		10 MHz		100 MHz 30 MHz				
Serbia	Yettel	n28: 10 MHz			100 MHz 30 MHz				
Slovakia	4ka				120 MHz (Nov 2021)				FWA
Slovakia	O_{2}		10 MHz		110 MHz (Sep 2021)			n3 (Oct 2020)	Also FWA
Slovakia	Orange		10 MHz		60 MHz (May 2021)				
Slovakia	Telekom	n1: 15 MHz (Dec 2020)	10 MHz						
Slovenia	A1		10 MHz		100 MHz		400 MHz	n? (Sep 2021)	Also FWA
Slovenia	T-2			40 MHz (Oct 2020)	? MHz (Dec 2020)				
Slovenia	Telekom	n7: 35 MHz (Jul 2020)	10 MHz		140 MHz		400 MHz		
Slovenia	Telemach		10 MHz	30 MHz	140 MHz (Jun 2021)		200 MHz		
Spain	MásOrange		10 MHz (Feb 2022)		80 MHz (Sep 2020) 110 MHz (Sep 2020) (Feb 2023)		400 MHz		Also FWA
Spain	Movistar	n1: 15 MHz n3: 20 MHz (Sep 2020)	10 MHz (Feb 2022)		100 MHz (Sep 2020) (Jun 2023)		1000 MHz (Sep 2023)		
Spain	Vodafone		10 MHz (Jan 2022)		90 MHz (Jun 2019) (Dec 2021)		400 MHz		Also FWA
Sweden	3	n1: 20 MHz (Jul 2021)			100 MHz (Jul 2021)			n38: 40 MHz (Jun 2020)	
Sweden	Net4Mobility (Telenor / Tele2)		10 MHz (Sep 2025)		100 MHz^{†} (Oct 2020 / May 2020)				^{†} RAN-sharing with Tele2 (May 2020) and Telenor (Oct 2020)
Sweden	Telia		10 MHz (May 2020)		120 MHz (May 2020)				
Switzerland	Salt		10 MHz		80 MHz (Jan 2021)			n67: 10 MHz n75: 10 MHz	Also FWA
Switzerland	Sunrise		5 MHz (Aug 2019)		100 MHz (Apr 2019) (Mar 2025)			n75: 15 MHz	Also FWA
Switzerland	Swisscom	n1: 30 MHz (Apr 2019)	15 MHz		120 MHz (Apr 2019) (Dec 2020)			n75: 50 MHz	Also FWA
Turkey	Türk Telekom	n3: 20 MHz (Mar 2021)	20 MHz^{†} (Apr 2026)		120 MHz (Apr 2026)			n? (2021)	^{†} 2x10 MHz
Turkey	Turkcell	n3: 20 MHz (Dec 2020)	20 MHz^{†} (Apr 2026)		140 MHz (Apr 2026)				^{†} 2x10 MHz
Turkey	Vodafone	n3: 20 MHz (May 2021)	20 MHz^{†} (Apr 2026)		80 MHz (Apr 2026)				^{†} 2x10 MHz
Ukraine	lifecell				100 MHz (Jan 2026)	? MHz (May 2019)			
Ukraine	Kyivstar				100 MHz (Jan 2026)				
Ukraine	Vodafone				100 MHz (Jan 2026)			n77 (May 2024)	
United Kingdom	3	n1: 10 MHz (Feb 2023) n28: 10 MHz (Oct 2022)			120–140 MHz^{†} (Aug 2019)			n1: 10 MHz (May 2024)	^{†} 100+20–40 MHz; Also FWA
United Kingdom	EE	n1: 15–20 MHz n3: 10–20 MHz (Mar 2022)	10 MHz (Oct 2021)		80 MHz^{†} (May 2019)			n67: 20 MHz	VoNR^{†} 40+40 MHz
United Kingdom	O_{2}	n1: 10 MHz	10 MHz (Oct 2021) (Feb 2024)		80 MHz (Oct 2019) (Feb 2024)			n8: 10 MHz n38: 20 MHz	
United Kingdom	Vodafone	n1: 15 MHz (Oct 2020) (Jun 2023)			90 MHz^{†} (Jul 2019) (Jun 2023)			n8: 10 MHz (Jun 2023)	^{†} 50+40 MHz

=== Oceania ===
Country or territory	Operator	Bands						Notes
Country or territory	Operator	DSS	n28 700 MHz	n40 2.3 GHz	n78 3.5 GHz	n258 26 GHz	Others	Notes
Australia	Optus	n1: 20 MHz n3: 15 MHz (Mar 2022) (Aug 2022) n8: 5–10 MHz		60 MHz (Feb 2020) (Aug 2022)	20–100 MHz (Oct 2019) (Aug 2022)	600–800 MHz (May 2021) (Aug 2022)	n8: 5–20 MHz (Feb 2023)	Also FWA
Australia	Telstra				30–80 MHz (May 2019) (May 2020)	1000 MHz (Jun 2021) (Nov 2022)	n5: 10 MHz (Mar 2021) n7: 20 MHz (Jul 2023) n26: 10 MHz	Also FWA; VoNR
Australia	Vodafone		15 MHz (Jul 2021)		5–65 MHz (Jun 2020)	600 MHz (Jul 2021)		Also FWA; VoNR
Fiji	Digicel				? MHz (May 2023)			
French Polynesia	Vodafone						n? (June 2024)	Also FWA
Guam; N. Mariana Islands	Docomo						n? (Aug 2020)	
Guam; N. Mariana Islands	GTA						n? (Nov 2022)	
New Zealand	2degrees				80 MHz (Feb 2022)			Also FWA
New Zealand	One				80 MHz (Dec 2019)			Also FWA
New Zealand	Spark			70 MHz	80 MHz (Jul 2020)			Also FWA

=== Non-Terrestrial Networks ===
Non-terrestrial operator	Country or territory	Terrestrial operator	Bands			Notes
Non-terrestrial operator	Country or territory	Terrestrial operator	n255 1600 MHz	n256 2100 MHz	Others	Notes
AST	United States	AT&T; Verizon			n5: 25 MHz (Feb 2025)	
AST	Canada	Bell			n5: ? MHz (Oct 2025)	
Skylo	Europe	Telekom		?		
Skylo	United States	Verizon	30 MHz (?)			
Skylo	Canada	Telus			n?: ? MHz (Nov 2023)	

== See also ==
- 5G NR
- 5G NR frequency bands
- List of LTE networks
