= LTE frequency bands =

Frequency bands used by Long Term Evolution networks

Long-Term Evolution (LTE) telecommunications networks use several frequency bands with associated bandwidths.

== Frequency bands ==
From Tables 5.5-1 "E-UTRA Operating Bands" and 5.6.1-1 "E-UTRA Channel Bandwidth" of the latest published version of the 3GPP TS 36.101, TS 36.104 and TS 36.106, the following table lists the specified frequency bands of LTE and the channel bandwidths each band supports. Band numbers can be written prefixed by a "b" as in "b66" for band 66.

Band	Duplex mode (Note: Frequency-division duplexing (FDD); time-division duplexing (TDD); FDD supplemental downlink (SDL); standalone downlink only (SDO))	ƒ (MHz)	Common name	Subset of band	Uplink (Note: User Equipment transmit; Base Station receive) (MHz)	Downlink (Note: User Equipment receive; Base Station transmit) (MHz)	Duplex spacing (MHz)	Channel bandwidths (MHz)	Notes
1	FDD	2100	IMT	65	1920 – 1980	2110 – 2170	190	5, 10, 15, 20	
2	FDD	1900	PCS	25	1850 – 1910	1930 – 1990	80	1.4, 3, 5, 10, 15, 20	
3	FDD	1800	DCS		1710 – 1785	1805 – 1880	95	1.4, 3, 5, 10, 15, 20	
4	FDD	1700	AWS‑1	10, 66	1710 – 1755	2110 – 2155	400	1.4, 3, 5, 10, 15, 20	
5	FDD	850	Cellular	26	824 – 849	869 – 894	45	1.4, 3, 5, 10	
6	FDD	800	UMTS 800	5, 19, 26	830 – 840	875 – 885	45	5, 10	(Note: Bands b6 and b23 are not applicable)
7	FDD	2600	IMT-E		2500 – 2570	2620 – 2690	120	5, 10, 15, 20	
8	FDD	900	Extended GSM		880 – 915	925 – 960	45	1.4, 3, 5, 10	
9	FDD	1800	UMTS 1700	3	1749.9 – 1784.9	1844.9 – 1879.9	95	5, 10	
10	FDD	1700	Extended AWS	66	1710 – 1770	2110 – 2170	400	5, 10, 15, 20	
11	FDD	1500	Lower PDC	74	1427.9 – 1447.9	1475.9 – 1495.9	48	5, 10	Japan
12	FDD	700	Lower SMH	85	699 – 716	729 – 746	30	1.4, 3, 5, 10	
13	FDD	700	Upper SMH		777 – 787	746 – 756	−31	5, 10	
14	FDD	700	Upper SMH		788 – 798	758 – 768	−30	5, 10	
17	FDD	700	Lower SMH	12, 85	704 – 716	734 – 746	30	5, 10	
18	FDD	850	Lower 800	26	815 – 830	860 – 875	45	5, 10, 15	Japan
19	FDD	850	Upper 800	5, 26	830 – 845	875 – 890	45	5, 10, 15	Japan
20	FDD	800	Digital Dividend		832 – 862	791 – 821	−41	5, 10, 15, 20	EU
21	FDD	1500	Upper PDC	74	1447.9 – 1462.9	1495.9 – 1510.9	48	5, 10, 15	Japan
22	FDD	3500	C-Band		3410 – 3500	3510 – 3600	100	5, 10, 15, 20	
23	FDD	2000	AWS-4		2000 – 2020	2180 – 2200	180	1.4, 3, 5, 10, 15, 20	
24	FDD	1600	Upper L‑Band		1626.5 – 1660.5 (Note: Uplink restricted to 1627.5–1637.5 MHz and 1646.5–1656.5 MHz)	1525 – 1559 (Note: Downlink restricted to 1526–1536 MHz)	−101.5 or −120.5	5, 10	US
25	FDD	1900	Extended PCS		1850 – 1915	1930 – 1995	80	1.4, 3, 5, 10, 15, 20	
26	FDD	850	Extended Cellular		814 – 849	859 – 894	45	1.4, 3, 5, 10, 15	
27	FDD	800	SMR		807 – 824	852 – 869	45	1.4, 3, 5, 10	US
28	FDD	700	APT		703 – 748	758 – 803	55	3, 5, 10, 15, 20	
29	SDL	700	Lower SMH	44	—N/a	717 – 728	—N/a	3, 5, 10	
30	FDD	2300	WCS		2305 – 2315	2350 – 2360	45	5, 10	
31	FDD	450	NMT		452.5 – 457.5	462.5 – 467.5	10	1.4, 3, 5	
32	SDL	1500	L‑Band	75	—N/a	1452 – 1496	—N/a	5, 10, 15, 20	EU
33	TDD	1900	IMT	39	1900 – 1920		—N/a	5, 10, 15, 20	
34	TDD	2000	IMT		2010 – 2025		—N/a	5, 10, 15	
35	TDD	1900	PCS		1850 – 1910		—N/a	1.4, 3, 5, 10, 15, 20	PCS Uplink
36	TDD	1900	PCS		1930 – 1990		—N/a	1.4, 3, 5, 10, 15, 20	PCS Downlink
37	TDD	1900	PCS		1910 – 1930		—N/a	5, 10, 15, 20	PCS Duplex Spacing
38	TDD	2600	IMT-E	41	2570 – 2620		—N/a	5, 10, 15, 20	IMT-E Duplex Spacing
39	TDD	1900	DCS–IMT Gap		1880 – 1920		—N/a	5, 10, 15, 20	
40	TDD	2300	S-Band		2300 – 2400		—N/a	5, 10, 15, 20	
41	TDD	2500	BRS		2496 – 2690		—N/a	5, 10, 15, 20	US
42	TDD	3500	CBRS		3400 – 3600		—N/a	5, 10, 15, 20	EU, Japan
43	TDD	3700	C-Band		3600 – 3800		—N/a	5, 10, 15, 20	
44	TDD	700	APT		703 – 803		—N/a	3, 5, 10, 15, 20	
45	TDD	1500	L-Band	50	1447 – 1467		—N/a	5, 10, 15, 20	
46	TDD	5200	U-NII-1–4		5150 – 5925		—N/a	10, 20	LAA
47	TDD	5900	U-NII-4	46	5855 – 5925		—N/a	10, 20	V2X
48	TDD	3500	CBRS		3550 – 3700		—N/a	5, 10, 15, 20	US
49	TDD	3500	C-Band	48	3550 – 3700		—N/a	10, 20	
50	TDD	1500	L‑Band	45	1432 – 1517		—N/a	3, 5, 10, 15, 20	EU
51	TDD	1500	L‑Band Extension		1427 – 1432		—N/a	3, 5	EU
52	TDD	3300	C-Band		3300 – 3400		—N/a	5, 10, 15, 20	
53	TDD	2400	S-Band		2483.5 – 2495		—N/a	1.4, 3, 5, 10	
54	TDD	1600	L-Band		1670 – 1675		—N/a	1.4, 3, 5	
65	FDD	2100	Extended IMT		1920 – 2010	2110 – 2200	190	1.4, 3, 5, 10, 15, 20	
66	FDD	1700	Extended AWS		1710 – 1780	2110 – 2200 (Note: Downlink between 2180–2200 MHz restricted to intra-band Supplemental Downlink)	400	1.4, 3, 5, 10, 15, 20	AWS‑1–3
67	SDL	700	EU 700		—N/a	738 – 758	—N/a	5, 10, 15, 20	
68	FDD	700	ME 700		698 – 728	753 – 783	55	5, 10, 15	MEA
69	SDL	2600	IMT-E		—N/a	2570 – 2620	—N/a	5, 10, 15, 20	IMT-E Duplex Spacing
70	FDD	1700	Supplementary AWS		1695 – 1710	1995 – 2020	300 or 295 (Note: Duplex spacing depends on whether the Uplink is paired with the lower or the upper part of the Downlink, with the remainder of the Downlink available for use as intra-band Supplemental Downlink)	5, 10, 15, 20 (Note: Carrier aggregation only)	AWS‑2–4 (Note: Downlink is made up of the PCS-H downlink block and the AWS-4 uplink blocks. The uplink is made up of the AWS-3 unpaired blocks)
71	FDD	600	Digital Dividend		663 – 698	617 – 652	−46	5, 10, 15, 20	US
72	FDD	450	PMR		451 – 456	461 – 466	10	1.4, 3, 5	EU
73	FDD	450	PMR		450 – 455	460 – 465	10	1.4, 3, 5	APT
74	FDD	1500	Lower L‑Band		1427 – 1470	1475 – 1518	48	1.4, 3, 5, 10, 15, 20	US
75	SDL	1500	L‑Band		—N/a	1432 – 1517	—N/a	5, 10, 15, 20	EU
76	SDL	1500	L‑Band Extension		—N/a	1427 – 1432	—N/a	5	EU
85	FDD	700	Extended Lower SMH	12	698 – 716	728 – 746	30	5, 10	
87	FDD	410	PMR		410 – 415	420 – 425	10	1.4, 3, 5	APT
88	FDD	410	PMR		412 – 417	422 – 427	10	1.4, 3, 5	EU
103	FDD	700	Upper SMH		787 – 788	757 – 758	-30		(Note: Restricted to NB-IoT only)
106	FDD	900	LMR		896 – 901	935 – 940	39	1.4, 3	US
107	SDO	600	UHF	113	—N/a	612 – 652	—N/a	6, 7, 8	(Note: LTE based 5G terrestrial broadcast)
108	SDO	500	UHF		—N/a	470 – 698	—N/a	6, 7, 8	
111	FDD	1800	pLTE		1800 – 1810	1820 – 1830	20	1.4, 3, 5, 10	Canada (Note: For private LTE networks operated primarily by utility companies)
112	SDO	500	UHF	108	—N/a	470 – 608	—N/a	6, 7, 8	
113	SDO	600	UHF	108	—N/a	606 – 698	—N/a	6, 7, 8	

== Frequency bands for satellite access ==
From Tables 5.5-1 "E-UTRA Operating Bands" and 5.6.1-1 "E-UTRA Channel Bandwidth" of the latest published version of the 3GPP TS 36.102 and TS 36.108, the following table lists the specified frequency bands of LTE and the channel bandwidths each band supports for satellite access.

Band (Note: Satellite bands are numbered in descending order from 256)	Duplex mode (Note: Frequency-division duplexing (FDD); time-division duplexing (TDD); standalone downlink only (SDO))	ƒ (MHz)	Common name	Uplink (Note: UE transmit; SAN receive) (MHz)	Downlink (Note: UE receive; SAN transmit) (MHz)	Duplex spacing (MHz)	Channel bandwidths (Note: Supported channel bandwidths depend on the UE category) (MHz)	Notes
256	FDD	2100	S-band	1980 – 2010	2170 – 2200	190		MSS
255	FDD	1600	L-band (US)	1626.5 – 1660.5	1525 – 1559	−101.5		MSS
254	FDD	2400	S-band	1610 – 1626.5	2483.5 – 2500	873.5		MSS
253	FDD	1600	L-band (US)	1668 – 1675	1518 – 1525	−150		MSS
252	FDD	2100	AWS-4	2000 – 2020	2180 – 2200	180		MSS
249	TDD	1600	L-band (US)	1616 – 1626.5		—N/a		(Note: Band 249 is defined only for NB-IoT operation)
246	SDO	1500	L-band	—N/a	1467 – 1492	—N/a		(Note: Band 246 only applies for LTE-based 5G Broadcast over Geosynchronous Satellite in region 3)

== Deployments by region ==
The following table shows the standardized LTE bands and their regional use. The main LTE bands are in bold print. Not yet deployed are not available (N/A). Partial deployments varies from country to country and the details are available at List of LTE networks.

- **Networks on LTE bands 7, 28 (LTE-FDD) are suitable for global roaming in ITU Regions 1, 2 and 3.**
- **Networks on LTE bands 1, 3 (LTE-FDD) are suitable for roaming in ITU Regions 1, 3 and partially Region 2 (e.g. Costa Rica, Venezuela, Brazil and some Caribbean countries or territories).**
- Networks on LTE band 20 (LTE-FDD) are suitable for roaming in ITU Region 1 only.
- Networks on LTE band 5 (LTE-FDD) are suitable for roaming in ITU Regions 2 and 3.
- Networks on LTE bands 38, 40 (LTE-TDD) may allow global roaming in the future (ITU Regions 1, 2 and 3).
- Networks on LTE band 8 (LTE-FDD) may allow roaming suitable for roaming in ITU Regions 1, 3 and partially Region 2 (e.g. Peru, El Salvador, Brazil and some Caribbean countries or territories) in the future.
- Networks on LTE bands 2 and 4 (LTE-FDD) are suitable for roaming in ITU Region 2 (Americas) only.

Band	Duplex Mode (Note: Frequency-division duplexing (FDD); time-division duplexing (TDD))	ƒ (MHz)	Common Name	North America (Note: ITU Region 2)	Central and South America	Caribbean	Europe (Note: ITU Region 1)	Africa	Asia (Note: ITU Region 3)	Oceania
**01**	**FDD**	**2100**	**IMT**	No	Brazil, Costa Rica	Cuba (ETECSA)	Yes	South Africa (Cell C, MTN, Vodacom), Namibia (MTC), Kenya (Airtel)	Yes	Australia (Vodafone), New Zealand (2degrees, Spark, One), French Polynesia (Vini, PMT-Vodafone)
02	FDD	1900	PCS	Yes	Yes	Yes	No	No	No	No
**03**	**FDD**	**1800**	**DCS**	No	Brazil, Costa Rica (Claro, Movistar), French Guiana, Suriname, Venezuela (Digitel GSM)	Aruba (SETAR), Cayman Islands, (Digicel), Cuba (ETECSA), Dominican Republic (Altice Dominicana)	Yes	Yes	Yes	French Polynesia (Vini, PMT-Vodafone), New Zealand (2degrees, Spark, One), New Caledonia (OPT)
04	FDD	1700	AWS	Yes	Yes	Yes	No	No	No	No
05	FDD	850	CLR	Yes	Argentina, Brazil, Guatemala (Tigo)	Barbados (FLOW), Bermuda, Dominican Republic (Altice)	No	Malawi (Access Communications)	Cambodia (SEATEL), India (Jio, Airtel), Indonesia (Smartfren), Malaysia (Telekom Malaysia), Pakistan (Telenor), Philippines (Smart), South Korea (LG U+, SK Telecom), China(China Telecom), Uzbekistan (Beeline UZ)	Australia (Vodafone)
**07**	**FDD**	**2600**	**IMT-E**	Canada (Bell, Rogers, Telus, Freedom Mobile), Mexico (AT&T, Telcel)	Yes	Guadeloupe, Martinique, St. Barthelemy, Saint Martin, Dominican Republic (Claro)	Yes	Ghana (Surfline), Zambia (MTN, Zamtel)	Yes	Australia (Vodafone), New Zealand (Spark, One), French Polynesia (Vini, Viti, PMT-Vodafone)
08	FDD	900	E-GSM	No	Argentina, Brazil, Peru (Bitel)	British Virgin Islands, Cuba (ETECSA)	Yes	Nigeria (ntel), South Africa (Vodacom)	Yes	Australia (Vodafone), New Zealand (2degrees)
11	FDD	1500	LPDC	No	No	No	No	No	Japan (au, SoftBank)	No
12	FDD	700	LSMH	Canada (Bell, Rogers, Telus), USA (AT&T, T-Mobile, US Cellular)	Bolivia, Belize	Yes	No	No	No	Kiribati (TSKL)
13	FDD	700	USMH	Canada (Bell, Telus, Freedom Mobile), USA (Verizon)	Bolivia, Belize	Yes	No	No	Uzbekistan (Ucell)	No
14	FDD	700	USMH	USA (FirstNet/AT&T)	—N/a	Barbados (Neptune)	No	No	No	No
17	FDD	700	LSMH	Canada (Bell, Telus), USA (AT&T)	Bolivia, Belize	Yes	No	No	No	No
18	FDD	800	L800	No	No	No	No	No	Japan (au)	No
19	FDD	800	U800	No	No	No	No	No	Japan (NTT Docomo)	No
**20**	**FDD**	**800**	**EUDD**	No	No	Guadeloupe, Martinique, Haiti	Yes	Yes	Kazakhstan (Beeline, Kcell), Nepal (Nepal Telecom), Iran (HiWEB)	Fiji (Digicel), French Polynesia (Vini, PMT-Vodafone), New Caledonia (OPT)
21	FDD	1500	UPDC	No	No	No	No	No	Japan (NTT Docomo)	No
25	FDD	1900	E-PCS	Canada (Rogers), USA (C Spire, T-Mobile)	—N/a	—N/a	No	No	No	No
26	FDD	850	E-CLR	USA (T-Mobile)	—N/a	—N/a	No	—N/a	Japan (au, NTT Docomo)	Australia (Telstra)
**28**	**FDD**	**700**	**APT**	Mexico (Red Compartida)	Yes	Cuba, Dominican Republic, Trinidad and Tobago	Yes	Nigeria (Glo Mobile), Kenya (Faiba 4G)	Yes	Yes
29	SDL	700	LSMH	USA (AT&T), Canada (Bell, Telus)	—N/a	—N/a	No	No	No	No
30	FDD	2300	WCS	USA (AT&T), Canada (Telus, Xplornet)	No	No	No	No	No	No
31	FDD	450	NMT	No	—N/a	No	Denmark (Net1), Finland (Ukko Mobile), Norway (ice), Russia (Skylink), Sweden (Net1)	—N/a	Armenia (Beeline), Indonesia (Net1), Philippines (Net1)	—N/a
32	SDL	1500	L‑Band	No	—N/a	—N/a	Italy (TIM, Vodafone), UK (VodafoneThree), Germany (Telekom), Latvia (LMT)	—N/a	—N/a	—N/a
**38**	**TDD**	**2600**	**IMT-E**	Canada, Mexico (AT&T)	Brazil, Colombia	Dominican Republic	Yes	Namibia (TN Mobile)	Malaysia (Yes 4G), Myanmar (Ananda 4G+), Sri Lanka (SLT), Iran (HiWEB), Taiwan (Gt)	—N/a
39	TDD	1900	DCS–IMT Gap	No	No	No	No	No	China (China Mobile)	No
40	TDD	2300	S-Band	No	—N/a	—N/a	Latvia (LMT), Lithuania (Bitė), United Kingdom (O2), Russia (t2), Ukraine (Kyivstar), Italy (Iliad Italia)	Zambia (Zamtel)	Yes	Yes
41	TDD	2500	BRS	USA (C Spire, T-Mobile), Canada (Xplornet)	—N/a	Jamaica (Digicel); Trinidad and Tobago (bmobile)	Russia (MTS)	Madagascar (Blueline)	China (China Mobile), Japan (KDDI (UQ), SoftBank (WCP)), Philippines (Globe), India (Vodafone Idea)	No
42	TDD	3500	C-Band	Canada (Bell, Xplornet)	Chile (Entel), Argentina (DirecTV), Colombia (Movistar)	—N/a	Slovakia (O2, SWAN, Slovanet)	No	Iran (MTN Irancell, Mobinnet), Japan (au, NTT Docomo, SoftBank)	—N/a
43	TDD	3700	C-Band	Canada (Bell, Xplornet)	Argentina (DirecTV)	—N/a	Slovakia (O2, SWAN)	No	Iran MTN Irancell	No
46	TDD	5200	U-NII-1–4	USA	—N/a	—N/a	United Kingdom (EE)			
48	TDD	3500	CBRS	USA	—N/a	—N/a	No	No	No	No
65	FDD	2100	E-IMT	No	—N/a	—N/a	EAN (T-Mobile, Inmarsat)	—N/a	—N/a	—N/a
66	FDD	1700	E-AWS	Yes	Argentina (Personal)	—N/a	No	No	No	No
71	FDD	600	USDD	Canada (Telus, Rogers), USA (C Spire, T-Mobile)	—N/a	—N/a	No	No	No	No

== See also ==
- LTE
- List of LTE networks
- 5G NR frequency bands
- UMTS frequency bands
- CDMA frequency bands
