= List of LTE networks =

This is a list of commercial Long-Term Evolution (LTE) networks around the world, grouped by their frequency bands. Some operators use multiple bands and are therefore listed multiple times in respective sections.

== General information ==
- For technical details on LTE and a list of its designated operating frequencies, bands, and roaming possibilities, see LTE frequency bands.
- Bands 33 to 53 are assigned to TDD-LTE.

Note: This list of network deployments does not imply any widespread deployment or national coverage.

== Africa ==
See List of LTE networks in Africa.

== Americas ==
=== Caribbean ===
Country	Operator	ƒ (MHz)	B	VoLTE	Launch date	Notes
Anguilla	Digicel	700	12 / 17		Jun 2018	10 MHz
Anguilla	FLOW	700	13		Nov 2015	10 MHz
Antigua and Barbuda	Digicel	700 b c	12 / 17		Nov 2012	10 MHz
Antigua and Barbuda	FLOW	1700	4		Nov 2014	
Aruba	SETAR	1800	3		Nov 2013	
Aruba	Digicel	1800	3		Dec 2017	
Bahamas	Aliv	700	13	Mar 2018	Nov 2016	10 MHz; CA (Note: Carrier Aggregation) of 25 MHz (CA_4A_13A).
Bahamas	Aliv	1700	4	Mar 2018	Nov 2016	15 MHz; CA of 25 MHz (CA_4A_13A).
Bahamas	BTC	700 b c	12 / 17	Nov 2024	Feb 2014	10 MHz in use 2 MHz remain unused.
Bahamas	BTC	1700	4	Nov 2024	2014	
Barbados	Digicel	700	12 / 17		Oct 2016	10 MHz
Barbados	Digicel	1900	2		Oct 2016	
Barbados	FLOW	850	5		Mar 2017	
Barbados	FLOW	1900	2		Mar 2017	
Bermuda	CellOne	700	12 / 17		May 2016	10 MHz in use 2 MHz remain unused.
Bermuda	Digicel	700	13		May 2017	10 MHz in use 1 MHz remains unused.
Bermuda	Paradise Mobile	700	12	Dec 2023	Dec 2023	5 MHz in use 1 MHz remains unused.
Bermuda	Paradise Mobile	1700	4 / 66	Dec 2023	Dec 2023	50 MHz
Bonaire	Digicel	1800	3		Dec 2017	
Bonaire	TELBO	1800	3		Jun 2015	
Bonaire	FLOW	1800	3		Jun 2015	
British Virgin Islands	CCT	900	8		Oct 2016	20 MHz; 3 MHz remain unused.
British Virgin Islands	CCT	1900	2		Jul 2015	15 MHz in use 15 MHz remain unused.
British Virgin Islands	Digicel	700	13		Jan 2017	10 MHz in use CA of 25 MHz (CA_4A_13A). 1 MHz remains unused.
British Virgin Islands	Digicel	1700	4		Jan 2017	15 MHz in use CA of 25 MHz (CA_4A_13A).
British Virgin Islands	FLOW	700	12 / 17		Nov 2016	10 MHz; CA of 25 MHz (CA_2A_17A). 2 MHz remain unused.
British Virgin Islands	FLOW	1900	2		Nov 2016	15 MHz; CA of 25 MHz (CA_2A_17A).
Cayman Islands	Digicel	1800	3		Dec 2013	20 MHz
Cayman Islands	Digicel	700	13		Dec 2013	10 MHz
Cayman Islands	FLOW	700 b c	12 / 17	2025?	Dec 2013	10 MHz
Cayman Islands	FLOW	1900	2	2025?	Aug 2016	5 MHz; CA of 15 MHz (CA_2A_17A). Available in the city of George Town.
Cayman Islands	Logic	2500	41		May 2021	90 MHz; FWB (Note: Fixed Wireless Broadband)
Cuba	ETECSA	700	28		Feb 2023	20 MHz
Cuba	ETECSA	900	8		Mar 2023	20 MHz in use 15 MHz remain for GSM & UMTS services.
Cuba	ETECSA	1800	3		Jan 2019	40 MHz; CA of 60 MHz (CA_1A_3C).
Cuba	ETECSA	2100	1		Jan 2023	20 MHz in use CA of 60 MHz (CA_1A_3C). 5 MHz remain for UMTS services.
Curaçao	Digicel	1800	3		Dec 2017	
Curaçao	FLOW	1800	3		Jun 2015	
Dominica	Digicel	700	12		Jan 2019	10 MHz
Dominica	FLOW	700	13		Oct 2014	10 MHz
Dominican Republic	Altice	1900	2	Mar 2020	Nov 2017	20 MHz; CA of 35 MHz (CA_2A_4A_5A).
Dominican Republic	Altice	1700	4	Mar 2020	Nov 2017	10 MHz; CA of 35 MHz (CA_2A_4A_5A).
Dominican Republic	Altice	850	5	Mar 2020	Nov 2017	5 MHz; CA of 35 MHz (CA_2A_4A_5A).
Dominican Republic	Altice	900	8	Mar 2020	?	5 MHz; 5 MHz remain for UMTS services.
Dominican Republic	Claro	1700	4		Jul 2014	20 MHz; 4×4 MIMO, 256 QAM; CA of 70 MHz (CA_2A_4A_7C).
Dominican Republic	Claro	1900	2		?	10 MHz; 4×4 MIMO, 256 QAM; CA of 70 MHz (CA_2A_4A_7C).
Dominican Republic	Claro	2600	7		?	40 MHz; 4×4 MIMO, 256 QAM; CA of 70 MHz (CA_2A_4A_7C).
Dominican Republic	Viva	1700	4		Aug 2017	10 MHz; 4×4 MIMO
Dominican Republic	WIND Telecom	2600	38		Jan 2015	FWB
Grenada	Digicel	700 c	12 / 17		Dec 2018	5 MHz
Grenada	Digicel	1900	2		?	
Grenada	FLOW	1900	2		?	10 MHz
Haiti	Natcom	1700	4		Jun 2016	
Jamaica	Digicel	700 b c	12 / 17		Jun 2016	10 MHz; CA of 50 MHz (CA_2A_4A_12A).
Jamaica	Digicel	1700	4		2018 ?	20 MHz; CA of 50 MHz (CA_2A_4A_12A).
Jamaica	Digicel	1900	2		2020 ?	20 MHz; CA of 50 MHz (CA_2A_4A_12A).
Jamaica	FLOW	700 a	12	Jan 2023 ?	Nov 2018	5 MHz; CA of 45 MHz (CA_2A_4A_12A).
Jamaica	FLOW	1700	4	Jan 2023 ?	Dec 2016	20 MHz; CA of 45 MHz (CA_2A_4A_12A).
Jamaica	FLOW	1900	2	Jan 2023 ?	May 2018	20 MHz; CA of 45 MHz (CA_2A_4A_12A). § NTN: ? MHz (Oct 2025).
Montserrat	Digicel	?	?		Dec 2017	
Saba	FLOW	1800	3		Dec 2016	
Saint Kitts and Nevis	Digicel	700	12 / 17		Oct 2018	10 MHz
Saint Kitts and Nevis	FLOW	700	13		Sep 2017	10 MHz
Saint Lucia	Digicel	700	12 / 17		Nov 2018	10 MHz
Saint Lucia	FLOW	700	13		Sep 2017	10 MHz; Available in Castries, Vieux Fort, UVF Airport and Soufrière.
Saint Vincent and the Grenadines	Digicel	700	12 / 17		Dec 2018	10 MHz
Saint Vincent and the Grenadines	FLOW	700	13		Dec 2018	10 MHz
Sint Eustatius	FLOW	1800	3		Nov 2016	
Sint Maarten	TelCell	1800	3		Sep 2017	
Trinidad and Tobago	Digicel	1900	2		Jul 2018	10 MHz in use 256 QAM; CA of 20 MHz (CA_2A_28A). CA of 25 MHz (CA_2A_4A). CA of 35 MHz (CA_2A_4A_28A). 10 MHz remain for UMTS services.
Trinidad and Tobago	Digicel	1700	4		Aug 2019	15 MHz; 256 QAM; CA of 25 MHz (CA_2A_4A). CA of 25 MHz (CA_4A_28A). CA of 35 MHz (CA_2A_4A_28A).
Trinidad and Tobago	Digicel	700	28		Oct 2020	10 MHz. 256 QAM; CA of 20 MHz (CA_2A_28A). CA of 25 MHz (CA_4A_28A). CA of 35 MHz (CA_2A_4A_28A).
Trinidad and Tobago	bmobile (TSTT)	1900	2	Jan 2025	Dec 2016	15 MHz in use 4×4 MIMO, 256 QAM; CA of 25 MHz (CA_2A_28A). CA of 30 MHz (CA_2A_4A). CA of 40 MHz (CA_2A_4A_28A). 5 MHz remain for UMTS services.
Trinidad and Tobago	bmobile (TSTT)	700	28	Jan 2025	Oct 2020	10 MHz; 4×4 MIMO, 256 QAM; CA of 25 MHz (CA_2A_28A). CA of 25 MHz (CA_4A_28A). CA of 40 MHz (CA_2A_4A_28A).
Trinidad and Tobago	bmobile (TSTT)	1700	4	Jan 2025	Nov 2022	15 MHz; 4×4 MIMO, 256 QAM; CA of 25 MHz (CA_4A_28A). CA of 30 MHz (CA_2A_4A). CA of 40 MHz (CA_2A_4A_28A).
Trinidad and Tobago	bmobile (TSTT)	2500	41		Nov 2014	50 MHz; 8×8 MIMO or Massive-MIMO; CA of 30 MHz (CA_41A_41A). CA of 50 MHz (CA_41C_41A). FWB
Turks and Caicos Islands	Digicel	700 b c	12 / 17		Mar 2015	10 MHz
Turks and Caicos Islands	FLOW	700 c	13		Aug 2015	10 MHz; Former Islandcom Wireless license.
Country	Operator	ƒ (MHz)	B	VoLTE	Launch date	Notes

=== French Overseas Territories (CEPT band plan) ===
Country	Operator	ƒ (MHz)	B	VoLTE	Launch date Cat.3 ≤ 100 Mbit/s	Launch date Cat.4 ≤ 150 Mbit/s	Launch date Cat.6 ≤ 300 Mbit/s	Launch date Cat.9 ≤ 450 Mbit/s	Notes
French Guiana	Orange Caraibe	800	20		Dec 2016	—N/a	Aug 2019	Aug 2019 (Cat. 16)	10 MHz; 4×4 MIMO, 256 QAM; CA of 50 MHz (CA_3A_7A_20A).
French Guiana	Orange Caraibe	1800	3		Dec 2016	Dec 2016	Dec 2016	Aug 2019 (Cat. 16)	20 MHz; 4×4 MIMO, 256 QAM; CA of 40 MHz (CA_3A_7A). CA of 50 MHz (CA_3A_7A_20A).
French Guiana	Orange Caraibe	2600	7		Dec 2016	Dec 2016	Dec 2016	Aug 2019 (Cat. 16)	20 MHz; 4×4 MIMO, 256 QAM; CA of 40 MHz (CA_3A_7A). CA of 50 MHz (CA_3A_7A_20A).
French Guiana	SFR Caraibe	800	20		Dec 2016	—N/a	Aug 2020	Aug 2020 (Cat. 15)	10 MHz; 4×4 MIMO, 256 QAM; CA of 50 MHz (CA_3A_7A_20A).
French Guiana	SFR Caraibe	1800	3		Aug 2020	Aug 2020	Aug 2020	Aug 2020 (Cat. 15)	20 MHz; 4×4 MIMO, 256 QAM; CA of 50 MHz (CA_3A_7A_20A).
French Guiana	SFR Caraibe	2600	7		Aug 2020	Aug 2020	Aug 2020	Aug 2020 (Cat. 15)	20 MHz; 4×4 MIMO, 256 QAM; CA of 50 MHz (CA_3A_7A_20A).
Guadeloupe; Martinique	Orange Caraibe	800	20	Jan 2021	Dec 2016	—N/a	Aug 2019	Aug 2019 (Cat. 16)	10 MHz; 4×4 MIMO, 256 QAM; CA of 50 MHz (CA_3A_7A_20A).
Guadeloupe; Martinique	Orange Caraibe	1800	3	Jan 2021	Dec 2016	Dec 2016	Dec 2016	Aug 2019 (Cat. 16)	20 MHz; 4×4 MIMO, 256 QAM; CA of 40 MHz (CA_3A_7A). CA of 50 MHz (CA_3A_7A_20A).
Guadeloupe; Martinique	Orange Caraibe	2600	7	Jan 2021	Dec 2016	Dec 2016	Dec 2016	Aug 2019 (Cat. 16)	20 MHz; 4×4 MIMO, 256 QAM; CA of 40 MHz (CA_3A_7A). CA of 50 MHz (CA_3A_7A_20A).
Guadeloupe; Martinique	SFR Caraibe	800	20		Dec 2016	—N/a	?	Sep 2018 (Cat. 15)	10 MHz; 4×4 MIMO, 256 QAM; CA of 50 MHz (CA_3A_7A_20A).
Guadeloupe; Martinique	SFR Caraibe	1800	3		Dec 2016	Dec 2016	?	Sep 2018 (Cat. 15)	20 MHz; 4×4 MIMO, 256 QAM; CA of 50 MHz (CA_3A_7A_20A).
Guadeloupe; Martinique	SFR Caraibe	2600	7		Dec 2016	—N/a	?	Sep 2018 (Cat. 15)	10 MHz in use 4×4 MIMO, 256 QAM; CA of 50 MHz (CA_3A_7A_20A).
Mayotte	Maore Mobile	?	?		Apr 2019				
Mayotte	Orange	?	?		Dec 2016				
Mayotte	SFR	?	?		Dec 2016				
Mayotte	Telco OI	?	?		Oct 2019				
Saint Barthelemy; Saint-Martin	Orange Caraibe	1800	3		Dec 2016	Dec 2016	Dec 2016		20 MHz; CA of 40 MHz (CA_3A_7A).
Saint Barthelemy; Saint-Martin	Orange Caraibe	2600	7		Dec 2016	Dec 2016	Dec 2016		20 MHz; CA of 40 MHz (CA_3A_7A).
Saint Barthelemy; Saint-Martin	Dauphin Telecom	1800	3		Feb 2019				FWB
Saint Barthelemy; Saint-Martin	Dauphin Telecom	2600	7		Feb 2019				FWB
Saint Barthelemy; Saint-Martin	UTS (Chippie)	1800	3		Nov 2015				
Saint-Pierre-et-Miquelon	Globaltel	800 ? 1800 ?	20 ? 3 ?		Sep 2018 ?				
Country	Operator	ƒ (MHz)	B	VoLTE	Launch date Cat.3 ≤ 100 Mbit/s	Launch date Cat.4 ≤ 150 Mbit/s	Launch date Cat.6 ≤ 300 Mbit/s	Launch date Cat.9 ≤ 450 Mbit/s	Notes

=== Central America, South America and Mexico (APT band plan) ===
Country	Operator	ƒ (MHz)	B	VoLTE	Launch date Cat.3 ≤ 100 Mbit/s	Launch date Cat.4 ≤ 150 Mbit/s	Launch date Cat.6 ≤ 300 Mbit/s	Launch date Cat.9 ≤ 450 Mbit/s	Launch date Cat.11 ≤ 600 Mbit/s	Notes
Argentina	Claro	1700	4		Jun 2015					10 MHz
Argentina	DirecTV	3700	43		2013	—N/a				
Argentina	Movistar	700	28		Oct 2017	Oct 2017 (via CA)				10 MHz; CA of 20 MHz (CA_4A_28A).
Argentina	Movistar	1700	4		Dec 2014	Oct 2017 (via CA)				10 MHz; CA of 20 MHz (CA_4A_28A).
Argentina	Personal	700	28		Dec 2016	—N/a	Dec 2016			10 MHz; CA of 25 MHz (CA_4A_28A).
Argentina	Personal	1700	4		Dec 2014	—N/a	Dec 2016			15 MHz; CA of 25 MHz (CA_4A_28A).
Argentina	Personal	2600	7		Oct 2017	?	?			20 MHz
Brazil	Algar	700	28		Nov 2016	Dec 2017 (via CA)				10 MHz; CA of 15 MHz (CA_3A_28A). Available in western MG
Brazil	Algar	1800	3		Jun 2017	Dec 2017 (via CA)				5 MHz in use CA of 15 MHz (CA_3A_28A). 5 MHz remain for GSM services.
Brazil	Algar	2300	40		Dec 2021					20 MHz
Brazil	Claro	700	28		Jun 2016	—N/a	Jun 2016		Jun 2017 (Cat.15)	10–20 MHz; 4×4 MIMO, 256 QAM; CA of 40 MHz (CA_3A_7A_28A).
Brazil	Claro	1800	3		Jun 2014		Jun 2016		Jun 2017 (Cat.15)	5–15 MHz in use (depending on region) 4×4 MIMO, 256 QAM; CA of 40 MHz (CA_3A_7A_28A).
Brazil	Claro	2100	1		Aug 2018					5 MHz
Brazil	Claro	2600	7		Dec 2012	?	Jun 2016		Jun 2017 (Cat.15)	20 MHz in use (+ 10 MHz in 11 Regions) CA of 30 MHz (CA_7C). 4×4 MIMO, 256 QAM; CA of 40 MHz (CA_3A_7A_28A). CA of 60 MHz, 4×4 MIMO, 256 QAM, LTE-U (Demo).
Brazil	Surf Telecom	2600	38		Apr 2019					15 MHz
Brazil	TIM	700	28	Jul 2017	Jun 2016	—N/a	Jun 2016			10 MHz; CA of 25 MHz (CA_3A_28A). CA of 35 MHz (CA_3A_7A_28A).
Brazil	TIM	1800	3	Jul 2017	Jan 2015	?	Jun 2016			10–15 MHz; CA of 20 MHz (CA_3A_7A). CA of 25 MHz (CA_3A_7A). CA of 25 MHz (CA_3A_28A). CA of 35 MHz (CA_3A_7A_28A).
Brazil	TIM	2100	1	Jul 2018	Jul 2018	?	?			15 MHz
Brazil	TIM	2600	7	Jul 2017	Jul 2013	?	Jun 2016			10 MHz (+ 10 MHz in 6 Regions) CA of 20 MHz (CA_3A_7A). CA of 25 MHz (CA_3A_7A). CA of 35 MHz (CA_3A_7A_28A).
Brazil	Vivo	700	28	Dec 2017	Oct 2016	—N/a	Oct 2016			10 MHz; CA of 35 MHz (CA_3A_7A_28A). (4×4 MIMO, 256 QAM) (Demo).
Brazil	Vivo	1800	3	Dec 2017	Oct 2016		Oct 2016			5–10 MHz; CA of 35 MHz (CA_3A_7A_28A). (4×4 MIMO, 256 QAM) (Demo).
Brazil	Vivo	2300	40	Dec 2021	Dec 2021	Dec 2021	Dec 2021			40-50 MHz (40 MHz in SP state and N, W regions; 50 MHz in ES, MG, RJ states) (Also 5G NR SA in some locations)
Brazil	Vivo	2600	7	Dec 2017	Apr 2013	Apr 2013	Oct 2016			20 MHz; CA of 35 MHz (CA_3A_7A_28A). (4×4 MIMO, 256 QAM) (Demo).
Chile	Claro	700	28		Oct 2016	—N/a	Oct 2016			10 MHz; CA of 30 MHz (CA_7A_28A).
Chile	Claro	2600	7		Jun 2013	?	Oct 2016			20 MHz; CA of 30 MHz (CA_7A_28A).
Chile	Entel	700	28		May 2016	—N/a	May 2016			15 MHz; CA of 35 MHz (CA_7A_28A).
Chile	Entel	2600	7		Mar 2014	Mar 2014	May 2016			20 MHz; CA of 35 MHz (CA_7A_28A).
Chile	Movistar	700	28	Jun 2018	May 2016	—N/a				10 MHz
Chile	Movistar	2600	7	Jun 2018	Nov 2013					20 MHz
Chile	WOM	1700	4	Dec 2018	Nov 2015					20 MHz in use 10 MHz remain for UMTS services.
Colombia	Claro	700	28		Jul 2020	—N/a				10 MHz
Colombia	Claro	2600	7		Feb 2014	—N/a			May 2018	30+15 MHz; 4×4 MIMO, 256 QAM
Colombia	Movistar	1900	2	Mar 2018	Mar 2018	—N/a	Mar 2018			10 MHz in use CA of 25 MHz (CA_2A_4A). 2.5 MHz remain unused.
Colombia	Movistar	1700	4	Sep 2016	Dec 2013	—N/a	Mar 2018			15 MHz; CA of 25 MHz (CA_2A_4A).
Colombia	Movistar	2600	38		Jul 2014	—N/a				40 MHz; FWB
Colombia	Tigo	700	28		Apr 2020	Apr 2020				20 MHz
Colombia	Tigo / ETB	1700	4		Dec 2013	—N/a				15 MHz
Colombia	WOM	1700	4		Aug 2014	—N/a				15 MHz
Colombia	WOM	700	28		Nov 2020					10 MHz
Colombia	WOM	2600	7		Nov 2020					10 MHz
Costa Rica	Claro	1800	3		Apr 2014	Jul 2018	Jul 2018			20 MHz; 4×4 MIMO
Costa Rica	Kölbi	1800	3		Jan 2018					
Costa Rica	Kölbi	2600	7		Nov 2013	Jan 2018			Jan 2018	20 MHz; 256 QAM
Costa Rica	Liberty	1800	3		Jul 2014					10 MHz in use 15 MHz remain for GSM services.
Ecuador	Claro	1700	4		Jul 2015					20 MHz
Ecuador	CNT Mobile	1700	4		Dec 2013					20 MHz
Ecuador	Movistar	1900	2	Apr 2018	May 2015					5 MHz in use 25 MHz remain for GSM/UMTS services.
El Salvador	Movistar	1900	2		Dec 2016					10 MHz in use 5 MHz remain for GSM/UMTS services.
El Salvador	Tigo	1700	4		Dec 2016	Dec 2016	Feb 2020			25 MHz; CA of 25 MHz (CA_4C).
Falkland Islands	Sure	1800	3		Aug 2018					
Guatemala	Claro	1900	2		?					10 MHz in use 10 MHz remain for GSM/UMTS services.
Guatemala	Movistar	1900	2		Oct 2014					30 MHz in use 256 QAM; CA of 30 MHz (CA_2C). 10 MHz remain for GSM services.
Guatemala	Tigo	850	5		May 2015					10 MHz in use 14 MHz remain for GSM services.
Guyana	GTT	700	28		Oct 2019					10 MHz
Guyana	Digicel	700	28		Feb 2021					10 MHz
Guyana	E-Net	700	28	Jul 2023	2021					20 MHz FWB
Honduras	Claro	1700	4		Mar 2015					20 MHz
Honduras	Tigo	1700	4		Dec 2014					20 MHz
Mexico	AT&T	1700	4	Jan 2017	Oct 2014					20 MHz
Mexico	AT&T	2600	7	Sep 2018	Sep 2018					20 MHz
Mexico	AT&T	2600	38	Sep 2018	Sep 2018					40 MHz
Mexico	Red Compartida	700	28	Mar 2018	Mar 2018					45 MHz; National wholesale network.
Mexico	Telcel	1700	4 / 66	Sep 2017	Nov 2012	?	Mar 2018			20+20 MHz
Mexico	Telcel	2600	7	Mar 2018	Mar 2018	Mar 2018	Mar 2018			30 MHz
Nicaragua	Claro	1700	4		Oct 2015					
Nicaragua	Tigo	1900	2		Nov 2015					15 MHz
Panama	C&W (+Movil)	700	28	Mar 2018	Mar 2015; Aug 2015					10 MHz
Panama	C&W (+Movil)	1900	2	Mar 2018	Aug 2015					10 MHz
Panama	Tigo	700	28		Mar 2015					10 MHz
Paraguay	Claro	1700	4		Apr 2016					15 MHz
Paraguay	Personal	1900	2		Feb 2013					10 MHz in use 5 MHz remain for UMTS services.
Paraguay	Tigo	1700	4		Apr 2016					15 MHz
Paraguay	VOX	1700	4		Dec 2012					15 MHz
Peru	Bitel	900	8		Dec 2016	—N/a				15 MHz
Peru	Claro	700	28		Sep 2016	—N/a	Jun 2018		Jun 2018	15 MHz; 256 QAM; CA of 30 MHz (CA_7A_28A).
Peru	Claro	1900	2		May 2014	—N/a	Jun 2018		Jun 2018	15 MHz; 256 QAM; CA of 30 MHz (CA_7A_28A).
Peru	Claro	3500	42		Nov 2016					20 MHz in use FWB
Peru	Movistar	700	28		Jul 2016	—N/a	Jul 2016			15 MHz; CA of 30 MHz (CA_7A_28A).
Peru	Movistar	1700	4		Jan 2014		Jul 2016			15 MHz; CA of 30 MHz (CA_7A_28A).
Peru	Entel	1700	4		Oct 2014					20 MHz
Peru	Entel	2300	40		Oct 2014					20 MHz in use FWB
Suriname	Digicel	1800	3		?					
Suriname	Telesur	700	28		Jan 2016					
Suriname	Telesur	1800	3		Jun 2015					
Uruguay	ANTEL	700	28		Dec 2017	Dec 2017	Dec 2017		Dec 2017	20 MHz; 256 QAM; CA of 50 MHz (CA_4A_?A_28A).
Uruguay	ANTEL	1700	4		Dec 2011	?	Dec 2017		Dec 2017	20 MHz; 256 QAM; CA of 50 MHz (CA_4A_?A_28A).
Uruguay	Claro	1700	4		Feb 2014	Feb 2014				20 MHz
Uruguay	Movistar	1900	2		Sep 2014	Sep 2014				20 MHz; 10 MHz remain for GSM/UMTS services.
Venezuela	Digitel	1800	3		Aug 2013					(↓) 1810 – 1825 MHz / (↑) 1715 – 1730 MHz
Venezuela	Movilnet	1700	4		Jan 2017					
Venezuela	Movistar	1700	4		Feb 2015					Available in Caracas & Puerto La Cruz.
Country	Operator	ƒ (MHz)	B	VoLTE	Launch date Cat.3 ≤ 100 Mbit/s	Launch date Cat.4 ≤ 150 Mbit/s	Launch date Cat.6 ≤ 300 Mbit/s	Launch date Cat.9 ≤ 450 Mbit/s	Launch date Cat.11 ≤ 600 Mbit/s	Notes

=== Belize, Bolivia, Canada (FCC band plan) ===
Country	Operator	ƒ (MHz)	B	VoLTE	Launch date Cat.3 ≤ 100 Mbit/s	Launch date Cat.4 ≤ 150 Mbit/s	Launch date Cat.6 ≤ 300 Mbit/s	Launch date Cat.9 ≤ 450 Mbit/s	Launch date Cat.11 ≤ 600 Mbit/s	Notes
Belize	Speednet (Smart)	700	13		Dec 2015					
Belize	BTL (DigiCell)	700	17		Dec 2016					
Belize	BTL (DigiCell)	1900	2		Dec 2016					
Bolivia	Entel	700 c	13		Apr 2014		Feb 2019 ?			10 MHz in use 2 MHz remain unused.
Bolivia	Tigo	700 b c	17		Jul 2014					10 MHz
Bolivia	Viva	1700	4		Jul 2015					15 MHz
Canada	ABC	3500	42		Apr 2014					FWB; Available in BC.
Canada	Bell	700 b	17		Apr 2014	—N/a				5 MHz
Canada	Bell	700 de	29		Aug 2015	—N/a	Aug 2015	2016 ?	Feb 2018 (Cat 16)	10 MHz; 4×4 MIMO, 256 QAM; CA of 40 MHz (CA_2A_4A_29A). (Note: 40 MHz (CA_2A_4A_29A) (10+20+10) in Tier 3 areas: #1-7, 24-29, 33-38); CA of 45 MHz (CA_2A_4A_29A). (Note: 45 MHz (CA_2A_4A_29A) (15+20+10) in Tier 3 areas: #1, 5-7, 24-29, 33)
Canada	Bell	1700	4 / 66		Sep 2011	Jun 2015	Jun 2015	2016 ?	Apr 2017; Feb 2018 (Cat 16)	10 or 20 MHz in use 4×4 MIMO, 256 QAM; CA of 30 MHz (CA_2A_4A). (Note: 30 MHz (CA_2A_4A) (10+20) in Tier 3 areas: #1-7, 18-29, 33-38) (Note: 30 MHz (CA_2A_4A) (20+10) in Tier 3 areas: #44-48); CA of 30 MHz (CA_4A_7A). (Note: 30 MHz (CA_4A_7A) (10+20) in Tier 3 areas: #8, 9, 12, 13, 15, 30, 51-53); CA of 40 MHz (CA_2A_4A_29A). CA of 45 MHz (CA_2A_4A_29A). CA of 55 MHz (CA_2A_4A_7A). (Note: 55 MHz (CA_2A_4A_7A) (15+20+20) in Tier 3 areas: #25-27, 29)
Canada	Bell	1900	2 / 25		Jun 2015	Jun 2015	Jun 2015	2016 ?	Apr 2017; Feb 2018 (Cat 16)	10,15 or 20 MHz in use 4×4 MIMO, 256 QAM; CA of 30 MHz (CA_2A_4A). CA of 40 MHz (CA_2A_4A_29A). CA of 45 MHz (CA_2A_4A_29A). CA of 55 MHz (CA_2A_4A_7A).
Canada	Bell	2600	7		Jul 2012	Jul 2012	Jun 2015	Apr 2017	Apr 2017; Feb 2018 (Cat 16)	20 MHz; 4×4 MIMO, 256 QAM; CA of 30 MHz (CA_4A_7A). CA of 55 MHz (CA_2A_4A_7A).
Canada	Bell	3500	42		Oct 2014					FWB
Canada	CCI Wireless	3500	42		Dec 2014					FWB
Canada	Eastlink	700	13		2016					5 MHz
Canada	Eastlink	1700	4		Feb 2013					20 MHz; License in NL, NS, PE, NB & Northern ON.
Canada	Freedom	700	13	Oct 2018	Oct 2018					5 MHz
Canada	Freedom	1700	4	Aug 2018	Nov 2016	Nov 2016	Nov 2016			15 MHz in use 4×4 MIMO; 5 MHz remain for UMTS services.
Canada	Freedom	1700	66	Aug 2018	Nov 2016	Nov 2016	Nov 2016			15 MHz; 4×4 MIMO; Not available in Eastern ON.
Canada	Freedom	2600	7	Aug 2018	Oct 2017					10 MHz; Available in Toronto.
Canada	Ice Wireless	850	5		Mar 2017					Available in NT, NU & YT.
Canada	Ice Wireless	1900	2		Mar 2017					Available in NT, NU & YT.
Canada	Qiniq/SSi	2600	7		Apr 2016					20 MHz; Available in NU.
Canada	Rogers	600	71	Oct 2020	Oct 2020	Oct 2020	Oct 2020			10, 15 or 20 MHz; DSS with 5G NR
Canada	Rogers	700 a b	12	Mar 2015	Apr 2014	Oct 2014 (via CA)				10 MHz; CA of 20 MHz (CA_4A_12A). (Cat.4)
Canada	Rogers	850	5	Mar 2015	Jan 2015	Oct 2014	Oct 2014			5 MHz
Canada	Rogers	1700	4 / 66	Mar 2015	Jul 2011	Oct 2014 (via CA)	Jan 2015			10–20 MHz in use 4×4 MIMO, 256 QAM; CA of 20 MHz (CA_4A_12A). (Cat.4); CA of 40 MHz (CA_4A_7A). DSS with 5G NR.
Canada	Rogers	1900	2 / 25	Mar 2015	Apr 2014	Oct 2014 (via CA)	Jan 2015			10–20 MHz in use 4×4 MIMO, 256 QAM; CA of 20 MHz (CA_2A_12A). (Cat.4); CA of 40 MHz (CA_2A_7A). DSS with 5G NR. § NTN: 5 MHz (July 2025).
Canada	Rogers	2600	7	Mar 2015	Nov 2012	May 2013	Jan 2015			20 MHz; 4×4 MIMO, 256 QAM; CA of 40 MHz (CA_4A_7A).
Canada	SaskTel	600	71	Apr 2020	?					
Canada	SaskTel	700	13	Apr 2020	?					5 MHz
Canada	SaskTel	1700	66	Apr 2020	Jan 2013					20 MHz in use Available in SK.
Canada	SaskTel	1900	2	Apr 2020	?					
Canada	SaskTel	2600	7	Apr 2020	?					
Canada	SaskTel	2600	38		Sep 2013					20 MHz in use FWB (↓↑) 2575 – 2595 MHz (↓↑) 2570 – 2575 MHz unused (Guard band); Available in SK.
Canada	Tbaytel	2600	7		Mar 2015					10 MHz; Available in the Thunder Bay area.
Canada	Telus	700 de	29	?	?	—N/a	?	?	Jul 2017	10 MHz; 4×4 MIMO, 256 QAM; CA of 50 MHz (CA_4A_7A_29A).
Canada	Telus	1700	4 / 66	Apr 2016	Feb 2012	?	?	?	Jul 2017	20 MHz; 4×4 MIMO, 256 QAM; CA of 50 MHz (CA_4A_7A_29A).
Canada	Telus	1900	2 / 25		Jun 2015	Jun 2015	Jun 2015	2016 ?	Apr 2017; Feb 2018 (Cat 16)	10, 15 or 20 MHz in use 4×4 MIMO, 256 QAM; CA of 30 MHz (CA_2A_4A). CA of 40 MHz (CA_2A_4A_29A). CA of 45 MHz (CA_2A_4A_29A). CA of 55 MHz (CA_2A_4A_7A).
Canada	Telus	2300	40		Apr 2014					5–10 MHz FWB; Available in BC and AB.
Canada	Telus	2600	7	?	?	?	?	?	Jul 2017	20 MHz; 4×4 MIMO, 256 QAM; CA of 50 MHz (CA_4A_7A_29A).
Canada	Telus	3500	42		Apr 2014					FWB; Available in QC.
Canada	Vidéotron	700	13	Nov 2017	Sep 2014	Sep 2014				5 MHz; Available in QC & Eastern ON.
Canada	Vidéotron	1700	4	Nov 2017	Sep 2014	Sep 2014				20 MHz; Available in QC & Eastern ON.
Canada	Xplornet	3500	42		Jun 2015					FWB

Canada: Bell Network Availability within Tier 3 License Areas

=== United States and US Territories (FCC band plan) ===
Apart from their main spectrum holdings across large regions in the country (listed below) the major US carriers (AT&T, Sprint, T-Mobile & Verizon) also hold various Cellular Market Area (CMA) and/or Economic Area (EA) licenses for the AWS 1700 band, as well as Major Trading Area (MTA) and/or Basic Trading Area (BTA) licenses for the PCS 1900 band. In several small regional areas the named operators combine these with their major spectrum holdings to increase the bandwidth for their LTE deployments. Due to the large amount of these "single" licenses they are not listed here.

Legend:	in use	partially in use	not in use

Country or Territory	Operator	VoLTE	B2/B25 1900 MHz	B4/B66 1700 MHz	B5/B26 850 MHz	B12/B17 700 MHz	B13 700 MHz	B14 700 MHz	B30 2300 MHz	B41 2500 MHz	B71 600 MHz	CA schemes	Notes
United States	AT&T (N/A in PR) (N/A in USVI)	May 2014	5–20 MHz; Nov 2013 [BTA/MTA] 5G NR	5–20 MHz; Sep 2011 [CMA/EA/REAG] (Note: AWS 1700 Block A (↓) 2110 – 2120 MHz / (↑) 1710 – 1720 MHz Cellular Market Area (CMA) License) (Note: AWS 1700 Block B (↓) 2120 – 2130 MHz / (↑) 1720 – 1730 MHz Economic Area (EA) License) (Note: AWS 1700 Block C (↓) 2130 – 2135 MHz / (↑) 1730 – 1735 MHz Economic Area (EA) License) (Note: AWS 1700 Block D (↓) 2135 – 2140 MHz / (↑) 1735 – 1740 MHz Regional Economic Area Grouping (REAG) License) (Note: AWS 1700 Block E (↓) 2140 – 2145 MHz / (↑) 1740 – 1745 MHz Regional Economic Area Grouping (REAG) License) (Note: AWS 1700 Block F (↓) 2145 – 2155 MHz / (↑) 1745 – 1755 MHz Regional Economic Area Grouping (REAG) License) [B66] 10 MHz; Oct 2018 (?) (1700j) [EA]	5–10 MHz; Dec 2014 (?) [CMA] 5G NR	[B17] 5–10 MHz; Sep 2011 (700bc) [CMA] (Note: LSMH 700 Block B (↓) 734 – 740 MHz / (↑) 704 – 710 MHz Cellular Market Area (CMA) License) (Note: LSMH 700 Block C (↓) 740 – 746 MHz / (↑) 710 – 716 MHz Cellular Market Area (CMA) License)	N/A	10 MHz; Jul 2018 (700d) [EA] Nationwide (Note: FirstNet USMH 700 Block D (↓) 758 – 768 MHz / (↑) 788 – 798 MHz Economic Area (EA) License)	10 MHz; Sep 2015 (2300ab) [CMA] Nationwide (Note: WCS 2300 Blocks A & B (↓) 2350 – 2360 MHz / (↑) 2305 – 2315 MHz Cellular Market Area (CMA) License)	N/A	N/A	4×4 MIMO (Nov 2017); 256 QAM (Nov 2017); LTE-LAA (Nov 2017); 15 MHz (CA_2A_17A) (CA_4A_17A) (Cat.4) (Mar 2014); 50 MHz (CA_2A_46C) (CA_4A_46C) (CA_12A_46C) [4×4 MIMO, 256 QAM] (Cat.16) (Nov 2017); B14: Firstnet, operated by AT&T. B17: Access for B12 devices via MFBI (Note: Multi-Frequency Band Indicator) since Sep 2015.	
United States	T-Mobile (N/A in AK)	May 2014	10–20 MHz; Mar 2014 [BTA/MTA] GSM ~~[B25]~~; ~~5 MHz~~; ~~Jul 2012 –~~; ~~Jun 2022~~; ~~(1900g)~~ ~~[EA]~~; ~~[173 of 175]~~; ~~(Note: EPCS 1900 Block G (↓) 1990 – 1995 MHz / (↑) 1910 – 1915 MHz Economic Area (EA) License)~~; 5G NR §	5–20 MHz; Mar 2013 [CMA/EA/REAG] [B66] 5–15 MHz; Oct 2016 (1700ghi) [CMA/EA] 5G NR	10 MHz; Jun 2016– Sep 2024 [CMA] [B26] 5 MHz; Jul 2012 – Jun 2022 [EA]	5 MHz; Dec 2014 (700a) [EA] (Note: LSMH 700 Block A (↓) 728 – 734 MHz / (↑) 698 – 704 MHz Economic Area (EA) License)	N/A	N/A	N/A	Jul 2013 – Jun 2022 (Refarmed for 5G NR)	5 MHz; Aug 2017 [PEA] (Note: USDD 600 Block A-G (↓) 617 – 652 MHz / (↑) 663 – 698 MHz Partial Economic Area (PEA) License) 5G NR	~~Sprint:~~; ~~8×8 MIMO (Mar 2017)~~; ~~64×64 MIMO (Sep 2018)~~; ~~LTE-LAA (Dec 2017)~~; ~~40 MHz (CA_41C) (Cat.4) (Sep 2016)~~; ~~60 MHz (CA_41D) (Cat.9) (Sep 2016)~~; ~~60 MHz (CA_41D)~~; ~~[4×4 MIMO, 256 QAM] (Cat.16) (Mar 2017)~~ T-Mobile: 4×4 MIMO (Sep 2016); 256 QAM (Sep 2016); LTE-LAA (Jun 2017); 15 MHz (CA_2A_12A) (Cat.4) (Aug 2014); 25 MHz (CA_2A_4A_12A) (Cat.6) (?); 20 MHz (CA_2A_4A) [4×4 MIMO, 256 QAM] (Cat.11) (Sep 2016); 25 MHz (CA_2A_4A_12C) [4×4 MIMO, 256 QAM] (Cat.11) (Jan 2017); 80 MHz (CA_2A_4A_255A_255C) [256 QAM] (Cat.15) (Jun 2017); 60 MHz (CA_2A_4A_71A) [4×4 MIMO, 256 QAM] (Cat.18) (Jun 2017); 50 MHz (CA_2A_4A_71A) (CA_2A_2A_71A) (CA_4A_4A_71A) [4×4 MIMO, 256 QAM] (Cat.16) (Nov 2018); 55 MHz (CA_2A_4A_46A_46C) (CA_2A_2A_46A_46C) (CA_4A_4A_46A_46C) [4×4 MIMO, 256 QAM] (Cat.18) (Dec 2017); 65 MHz (CA_2A_71A_255C) (CA_4A_71A_255C) [4×4 MIMO, 256 QAM] (Cat.18) (Feb 2018) § NTN: 5 MHz (B25) (Jan 2025).	
United States	Verizon (N/A in PR) (N/A in USVI)	Sep 2014	10–20 MHz; Dec 2014 [BTA/MTA] 5G NR	5–10 MHz; Oct 2013 [CMA/EA/REAG] 5G NR	5-10 MHz; 2017 (?) [CMA] 5G NR	N/A	10 MHz; Dec 2010 (700c) [REAG] [#1-8, 12] (Note: USMH 700 Block C (↓) 746 – 756 MHz / (↑) 777 – 787 MHz Regional Economic Area Grouping (REAG) License)	N/A	N/A	N/A	N/A	4×4 MIMO (Jul 2018); 256 QAM (Jul 2018); 20 MHz (CA_4A_13A) (Cat.4) (May 2015); 40 MHz (CA_2A_4A_13A) (CA_2A_2A_13A) (CA_4A_4A_13A) (Cat.9) (Aug 2016); 40 MHz (CA_2A_4A_13A) (CA_2A_2A_13A) (CA_4A_4A_13A) [4×4 MIMO, 256 QAM] (Cat.11) (Jul 2018); 80 MHz (CA_4A_46A_46C) [4×4 MIMO, 256 QAM] (Cat.16) (Aug 2017); 100 MHz (CA_2A_4A_46C_46C) [4×4 MIMO, 256 QAM] (Cat.19) (Sep 2018)	
Puerto Rico; U.S. Virgin Islands	Liberty	May 2014	15 MHz; 15 MHz; Nov 2013 [BTA/MTA]	10 MHz; 5 MHz; Sep 2011 [CMA/EA] [B66] 10 MHz; Oct 2018 (?) (1700j) [EA]	5–10 MHz; Dec 2014 (?) [CMA] 5G NR	[B17] 5–10 MHz; Sep 2011 (700bc) [CMA]	N/A	N/A	10 MHz; Sep 2015 (2300ab) [CMA]	N/A	No 5G NR	4×4 MIMO (Nov 2017); 256 QAM (Nov 2017); LTE-LAA (Nov 2017); 15 MHz (CA_2A_17A) (CA_4A_17A) (Cat.4) (Mar 2014); 50 MHz (CA_2A_46C) (CA_4A_46C) (CA_12A_46C) [4×4 MIMO, 256 QAM] (Cat.16) (Nov 2017); B17: Access for B12 devices via MFBI since Sep 2015.	
Puerto Rico; U.S. Virgin Islands	Claro (PRTC)	Feb 2021	N/A	~~15 MHz~~; ~~Nov 2016~~; ~~[EA]~~ 5G NR [B66] 10 MHz (?) (1700gh) [CMA/EA]	5 MHz (?) [CMA] GSM; UMTS	5–10 MHz; Dec 2011 (700ab) [EA #174/CMA]	N/A	N/A	N/A	15–30 MHz (?) 5G NR	N/A	4×4 MIMO; 256 QAM; 15 MHz (CA_4A_12A) (Cat.4) (Nov 2016)	

Country	Operator	ƒ (MHz)	B	VoLTE	Launch date Cat.3 ≤ 100 Mbit/s	Launch date Cat.4 ≤ 150 Mbit/s	Launch date Cat.6 ≤ 300 Mbit/s	Notes
American Samoa	BlueSky	700	12		Mar 2017	Mar 2017 (via CA)		10 MHz
American Samoa	BlueSky	1900	2		Mar 2017	Mar 2017 (via CA)		10 MHz
Guam	GTA	1700 c	4		Oct 2013			5 MHz [EA #173] (Pulse Mobile LLC)
Guam	IT&E Overseas	700 a b	12		Jul 2012			10 MHz [CMA #732], [EA #173] (Choice Phone LLC, PTI Pacifica, Inc.)
Guam	NTT DoCoMo	700 c	17	Aug 2019	Oct 2012			5 MHz [CMA #732] (Guam Cellular and Paging)
Northern Mariana Islands	IT&E Overseas	700 a	12		Oct 2015			5 MHz [EA #137] (PTI Pacifica, Inc.)
Northern Mariana Islands	NTT DoCoMo	?	?	Aug 2019	Jul 2017			
Puerto Rico	FirstNet	700 d	14		Mar 2018			10 MHz
Puerto Rico	T-Mobile	700 c	13		Apr 2012			10 MHz [REAG #10]
United States	AT&T	700 d e	29		Sep 2017			5–10 MHz
United States	AT&T	3500	48		May 2020			Also FWB; GAA (Note: General Authorized Access)
United States	Adams Networks	700 c	17		May 2013			5 MHz FWB [CMA #396, 397]
United States	AlaskaComm / GCI	1700	4		Oct 2012			Alaska Wireless Network (AWN)
United States	ASTAC	?	?		Nov 2017			
United States	Big River Broadband	1700 a	4		Aug 2012			15 MHz FWB [CMA #516, 521]
United States	BIT Broadband (Wildfire)	700 b	12		Sep 2014			5 MHz [CMA #687, 688, 689] NetAmerica Alliance Member
United States	Bluegrass Cellular	700 b c	12		Apr 2013		?	5–10 MHz FWB; Block B [CMA #209, 293, 447, 448] Block C [CMA #119, 209, 293, 409, 410, 444, 445, 446, 447, 449]
United States	Bug Tussel Wireless	1700	4		Apr 2017 ?			10 MHz
United States	C Spire	700 a b c	12		? 2016			
United States	C Spire	850	5		? 2016			
United States	C Spire	1900	2		Sep 2012			[depends on MTA/BTA]
United States	C Spire	2500	41		Jun 2017			Massive-MIMO & 256 QAM (Jan 2020)
United States	Cellular One of North East Arizona	700 c	12 / 17	May 2023	? 2017			
United States	Cellular One of North East Arizona	850	5	May 2023	? 2017			
United States	Cellular One of North East Arizona	1900	2	May 2023	? 2017			
United States	Cellular One of North East Arizona	1700	66	May 2023	? 2017			
United States	Cellular One of North East Arizona	600	71	May 2023	? 2019			
United States	Colorado Valley Com	700 a	12		Dec 2013			5 MHz FWB [EA #131] NetAmerica Alliance Member
United States	ETC	700 b	12		Aug 2013			5 MHz [CMA #411] (Miles Communications Corp)
United States	Evolve Broadband	700 b	17	Jan 2016	Feb 2013			5 MHz FWB [CMA #667] (Worldcall Interconnect Inc.)
United States	Infrastructure Networks	700	12		Jul 2012			
United States	Limitless Mobile	1900	2		Mar 2016			Bankrupt as of Nov 2016.
United States	Nex-Tech Wireless	700 b	12		Nov 2013			[CMA #429, 439, 440] (United Telephone Association Inc.)
United States	Nortex (SkyFi)	700 b	17		Sep 2012			FWB [CMA #657] NetAmerica Alliance Member
United States	PTCI	700 b c	12		Mar 2012			[CMA #596]FWB; NetAmerica Alliance Member
United States	Redzone Wireless	2500	41		Jun 2015			
United States	Rise Broadband	2500	41		May 2016			FWB
United States	Rock Wireless	700	12		Oct 2014			
United States	Rock Wireless	2500	41		Feb 2021			FWB
United States	Silver Star	700	12		Nov 2014			
United States	SouthernLINC Wireless	850	26		?			3 MHz
United States	Space Data Corporation	1700 a	4		Oct 2012			[CMA #315] LTE over satellite backhaul in Atqasuk (AK).
United States	Speed Connect	2500	41		May 2015			
United States	T-Mobile	700 b c	12	Feb 2017	Feb 2017			5 MHz in MT, WY 10 MHz in ND
United States	T-Mobile	1900	25	Jan 2025	Jan 2025			5 MHz. Direct to Cell LTE NTN service provided by SpaceX.
United States	U.S. Cellular	700 a b	12	Jun 2017	Mar 2012			[depends on EA/CMA]
United States	U.S. Cellular	850	5	Jun 2017	May 2013			[depends on CMA]
United States	United Wireless	700 c	12		Apr 2013			FWB [CMA #200, 255, 260, 295, 325, 326, 429, 439, 440, 482, 484, 485, 487]
United States	Verizon	3500	48		? 2020			30-40 MHz (x̄: 36 MHz); 557 PALs (Note: Priority Access License) in 157 counties GAA
United States	VTel Wireless	700 c	17		Jul 2014			FWB [CMA #44, 248, 266, 679, 680]
United States	VTel Wireless	1700	4		Jul 2014			
United States	West Central Wireless	700 a b	12		Jun 2012 - Aug 2023			Block A [EA #128, 129] Block B [CMA #220, 294, 659, 660, 665, 666] (Central Texas Telephone) Hosted LTE
U.S. Virgin Islands	FirstNet	700 d	14		Mar 2018			10 MHz
U.S. Virgin Islands	Viya	2500	41		Jan 2015			
Country	Operator	ƒ (MHz)	B	VoLTE	Launch date Cat.3 ≤ 100 Mbit/s	Launch date Cat.4 ≤ 150 Mbit/s	Launch date Cat.6 ≤ 300 Mbit/s	Notes

==== Third-party users of U.S. LTE networks and spectrum sublessees ====
Verizon LTE in Rural America Program -; Operators using USMH 700 Block C License (band 13):
Operator	Launch date	Notes
Appalachian Wireless	Jun 2013	
Bluegrass Cellular	Nov 2012	
Cellcom	Apr 2012	
Carolina West Wireless	Nov 2014	
Chariton Valley Telephone Corporation	Sep 2012	
Chat Mobility	May 2013	
Copper Valley Telecom	Sep 2013	
Custer Telephone Cooperative	Jul 2013	
Ketchikan Public Utilities	May 2014	
Matanuska Telephone Association	Sep 2013	
Mid-Rivers Communications	Dec 2013	FWB
MTPCS / Cellular One	Nov 2012	
Northwest Missouri Cellular (NorthWest Cell)	May 2013	
Pioneer Cellular	Apr 2012	
S and R Communications	Nov 2013	FWB
Sagebrush Cellular (Nemont)	?	
Sprocket Wireless (Cross Telephone)	Nov 2012	
Strata Networks	Nov 2012	
Thumb Cellular (Agri-Valley Communications)	Jan 2013	
Triangle Communications	?	
Wireless Partners	?	

AT&T subsidiaries using its LTE network:
Operator	Launch date	Notes
Cricket Wireless	Dec 2011	subsidiary, former subsidiary of Leap Wireless.

T-Mobile subsidiaries & affiliates using its LTE network:
Operator	Launch date	Notes
Metro by T-Mobile	May 2013	subsidiary
Shentel	Nov 2012	affiliate
SI Wireless	Sep 2014	

Dish subsidiaries & affiliates:
Operator	Launch date	Notes
Boost Mobile	Feb 2013	subsidiary as of July 1, 2020. former subsidiary of Sprint Corporation.

== Asia ==
See List of LTE networks in Asia.

== Europe ==
See List of LTE networks in Europe.

== Oceania ==
Country or Territory	Operator	VoLTE	B1 2100 MHz	B3 1800 MHz	B5/B26 850 MHz	B7 2600 MHz	B8 900 MHz	B28 700 MHz	B40 2300 MHz	CA schemes	Notes
Australia	NBN Co		-	-	-	-	-	-	20 MHz; Apr 2012		FWB
Australia	Optus	May 2016	20 MHz; Feb 2017; 5G NR	20 MHz; Sep 2012; 5G NR	N/A	20 MHz; Nov 2014	20 MHz, 5G NR	10 MHz; Jul 2014	40 MHz; Jun 2013; 5G NR	4×4 MIMO (Feb 2017); 256 QAM (Feb 2017); 20 MHz (Cat.4) (Sep 2016); 40 MHz (CA_40C) (Cat.6) (Sep 2014); 55 MHz (CA_3A_40C) (Cat.9) (Aug 2015); 55 MHz (CA_3A_40C) [4×4 MIMO, 256 QAM] (Cat.16) (Feb 2017); 60 MHz (CA_1A_3A_7A_28A) [4×4 MIMO, 256 QAM] (Cat.16) (Feb 2017); B3: Available in 11 of 12 Regions. B7/B28: Nationwide; B40: Available in metro areas.	
Australia	Telstra	Sep 2015	20 MHz; Sep 2018	20 MHz; Sep 2011	10 + 10 MHz, 5G NR †	40 MHz; Sep 2015 § 5G NR	N/A	20 MHz; Jul 2014	N/A	4×4 MIMO (Jan 2017); 256 QAM (Jan 2017); 64 QAM 2CA UL (Jan 2017); 20 MHz (Cat.4) (Jul 2014); 40 MHz (CA_3A_7A) (Cat.6) (Nov 2014); 60 MHz (CA_3A_7C) (Cat.9) (Aug 2015); 80 MHz (CA_3A_7C_28A) (Cat.11) (Sep 2015); 80 MHz (CA_3A_7A_28A) [4×4 MIMO, 256 QAM] (Cat.16) (Jan 2017); 100 MHz (CA_1A_3A_7C_28A) [4×4 MIMO, 256 QAM] (Cat.20) (Sep 2018); B3: Available in 11 of 12 Regions. B3: Not available in Canberra. B7/B28: Nationwide †: Band 5: 10 MHz & Band 26: 10 MHz § NTN: 10 MHz (Jun 2025).	
Australia	TPG (VHA)	Jan 2016	5–20 MHz; Dec 2016; 5G NR	5–20 MHz; Jun 2013	10 MHz; Oct 2014	No	N/A	15 MHz; 5G NR	N/A	20 MHz (Wideband) (Cat.4) (Jan 2014) (in metro areas only); 20 MHz (CA_3A_5A) (Cat.4) (Nov 2014) (in VICT, NQLD, WAUS); B3: Available in 6 of 12 Regions. B5/B28: Nationwide	

Country	Operator	ƒ (MHz)	B	VoLTE	Launch date Cat.3 ≤ 100 Mbit/s	Launch date Cat.4 ≤ 150 Mbit/s	Launch date Cat.6 ≤ 300 Mbit/s	Launch date Cat.9 ≤ 450 Mbit/s	Launch date Cat.11 ≤ 600 Mbit/s	Notes
Christmas Island	CiiA	700	28		Feb 2017					
Cook Islands	Bluesky	700	28		Mar 2017					
Cook Islands	Bluesky	1800	3		Mar 2017					
Federated States of Micronesia	FSM Telecom	1800	3		Oct 2018					
Fiji	Digicel	700	28		Aug 2014	—N/a	Mar 2018			15 MHz; CA of 30 MHz (CA_3A_28A).
Fiji	Digicel	1800	3		Aug 2014		Mar 2018			15 MHz; CA of 30 MHz (CA_3A_28A).
Fiji	TFL	700	28		Sep 2016	—N/a	Sep 2016			15 MHz FWB
Fiji	Vodafone	1800	3		Dec 2013	Dec 2013	Aug 2016			30 MHz; CA of 30 MHz (CA_3C).
French Polynesia	Vini	800	20		Mar 2017					
French Polynesia	Vini	2600	7		Mar 2017					
French Polynesia	Vini	800	20		Feb 2015					
French Polynesia	Vini	2600	7		Feb 2015					
French Polynesia	Vodafone	800	20		Nov 2017					10 MHz
French Polynesia	Vodafone	2100	1		Nov 2017					10 MHz
Kiribati	ATHKL	1800	3		Oct 2013					LTE over satellite backhaul.
Marshall Islands	MINTA	700	28		Mar 2017					
Nauru	Digicel	1800	3		Dec 2016					
Nauru	Neotel	1800	3		Dec 2016					
New Caledonia	OPT-NC	800	20		Feb 2015					Not available in Noumea.
New Caledonia	OPT-NC	1800	3		Feb 2015					
New Caledonia	OPT-NC	2600	7		Feb 2015					Available in Noumea.
New Zealand	2degrees	700	28		Jan 2015					10 MHz
New Zealand	2degrees	900	8		Mar 2018					5 MHz in use 5 MHz remain for UMTS services.
New Zealand	2degrees	1800	3		Jun 2014	Jun 2014				20 MHz in use 5 MHz remain unused.
New Zealand	Spark	700	28		Aug 2014	Aug 2014	Jun 2017	Jun 2017		20 MHz FWB; CA of 60 MHz (CA_7A_28A_40A).
New Zealand	Spark	1800	3		Nov 2013	Nov 2013	Dec 2014			20 MHz in use CA of 40 MHz (CA_3A_7A). 5 MHz remain unused.
New Zealand	Spark	2300	40		Jun 2017	Jun 2017	Jun 2017	Jun 2017		20 MHz in use CA of 60 MHz (CA_7A_28A_40A).
New Zealand	Spark	2600	7		Dec 2014	Dec 2014	Dec 2014	Jun 2017		20 MHz; CA of 40 MHz (CA_3A_7A). CA of 60 MHz (CA_7A_28A_40A).
New Zealand	One NZ	700	28	Jun 2019	Jul 2014					15 MHz
New Zealand	One NZ	1800	3	Jun 2019	Feb 2013	May 2013				20 MHz in use 5 MHz remain for GSM services.
New Zealand	One NZ	2600	7	Jun 2019	Jul 2014 ?					15 MHz § NTN: 5 MHz (Dec 2024).
Niue	Telecom Niue	700	28		Aug 2018					
Norfolk Island	NIDS	1800?	3?		Nov 2018					
Palau	PNCC	700	28		Nov 2017					
Palau	PMCI	?	?		2019?					
Papua New Guinea	Digicel	700	28		Mar 2014					20 MHz in use
Papua New Guinea	Telikom PNG	700	28		Oct 2016					
Papua New Guinea	NICTA	700	28		Oct 2016					
Papua New Guinea	NITTEL	700	28		Oct 2016					
Samoa	Bluesky	700	28		Aug 2016					
Samoa	Bluesky	1800	3		Aug 2016					
Samoa	Digicel	1800	3		May 2016					
Solomon Islands	Our Telecom	700	28		Nov 2017					FWB
Solomon Islands	Our Telecom	1800	3		Nov 2017					
Tokelau	Teletok	700	28		May 2017					
Tonga	Digicel	700	28		Nov 2017					CA of ? MHz (CA_3A_28A).
Tonga	Digicel	1800	3		Nov 2017					CA of ? MHz (CA_3A_28A).
Tonga	TCC U-Call	?	?		Nov 2018					
Tuvalu	TTC	850	5		Apr 2018					
Vanuatu	Digicel	700	28		Jan 2015					
Vanuatu	Telecom Vanuatu	700	28		Nov 2017					
Vanuatu	WanTok	2300	40		Apr 2014					
Wallis and Futuna	SPT	?	?		Oct 2015					
Country	Operator	ƒ (MHz)	B	VoLTE	Launch date Cat.3 ≤ 100 Mbit/s	Launch date Cat.4 ≤ 150 Mbit/s	Launch date Cat.6 ≤ 300 Mbit/s	Launch date Cat.9 ≤ 450 Mbit/s	Launch date Cat.11 ≤ 600 Mbit/s	Notes

== Non-terrestrial Networks (NTN) ==
Non-terrestrial operator	Country or territory	Terrestrial operator	Band	Notes
Starlink	Japan	au	1: 5 MHz (Apr 2025)	
Starlink	New Zealand	One	7: 5 MHz (Dec 2024)	
Starlink	United States	T-Mobile	25: 5 MHz (Feb 2025)	
Starlink	Canada	Rogers Wireless	2: 5 MHz (Jul 2025)	
Starlink	Chile	Entel	2: 5 MHz (Aug 2025)	
Starlink	Peru	Entel	2: 5 MHz (Aug 2025)	
Starlink	Ukraine	Kyivstar	3: 5 MHz (Aug 2025)	
Starlink	Jamaica	FLOW	? (Oct 2025)	
Starlink	United Kingdom	O2	3: 5 MHz (Feb 2026)	

== See also ==
- LTE
- LTE frequency bands
- List of 5G NR networks
- List of UMTS networks
- List of CDMA2000 networks
- List of mobile network operators
