= Cameron Zubko =

Canadian businessman and investor

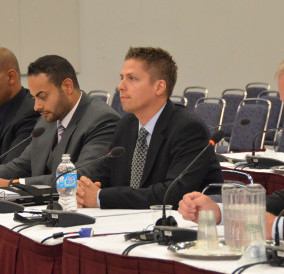
- Cameron Zubko Speaking at CRTC Hearing, Montreal, Quebec May 6, 2013
- Born: 1975 (age 50–51); Montreal, Quebec
- Education: University of British Columbia, University of Victoria

Cameron Zubko (born 1975) is a Canadian businessman and investor. Zubko is co-founder of Ice Wireless, a Canadian 4G/LTE telecommunications company.

In 2012, Zubko initiated a partnership between Ice Wireless and nationwide VoIP provider Iristel and led the rollout of the Ice Wireless mobile network across the Yukon, Northwest Territories and Nunavut.

Zubko is a strong advocate for improving telecommunications in Canada and Canada's northern regions.

== Biography ==
Born in Montreal, Quebec, Zubko holds a Juris Doctor of Law from the University of British Columbia and a Bachelor of Commerce from the University of Victoria.

== Career ==
Before joining Ice Wireless, Zubko spent ten years in finance and government affairs in London, New York City, and Beijing.

Zubko currently resides in Vancouver, British Columbia. He is a former member of the City of Vancouver's Urban Indigenous Peoples' Advisory Committee.
