= LTE-WLAN Aggregation =

Usage of LTE and Wi-Fi links simultaneously

LTE-WLAN aggregation (LWA) is a technology defined by the 3GPP. In LWA, a mobile handset supporting both LTE and Wi-Fi may be configured by the network to utilize both links simultaneously. It provides an alternative method of using LTE in unlicensed spectrum, which unlike LAA/LTE-U can be deployed without hardware changes to the network infrastructure equipment and mobile devices, while providing similar performance to that of LAA. Unlike other methods of using LTE and WLAN simultaneously (e.g. Multipath TCP), LWA allows using both links for a single traffic flow and is generally more efficient, due to coordination at lower protocol stack layers.

For a user, LWA offers seamless usage of both LTE and Wi-Fi networks and substantially increased performance. For a cellular operator, LWA simplifies Wi-Fi deployment, improves system utilization and reduces network operation and management costs. LWA can be deployed in collocated manner, where the eNB and the Wi-Fi AP or AC are integrated into the same physical device or in non-collocated manner, where the eNB and the Wi-Fi AP or AC are connected via a standardized interface referred to as Xw. The latter deployment option is particularly suitable for the case when Wi-Fi needs to cover large areas and/or Wi-Fi services are provided by a 3rd party (e.g. a university campus), rather than a cellular operator.

LWA has been standardized by the 3GPP in Release-13. Release 14 Enhanced LWA (eLWA) adds support for 60 GHz band (802.11ad and 802.11ay a.k.a. WiGig) with 2.16 GHz bandwidth, uplink aggregation, mobility improvements and other enhancements.

== Background ==
Cellular networks have been designed for licensed spectrum. However, as usage patterns changed from voice-centric to data-centric and data usage surged, operators started looking into unlicensed spectrum opportunities. Using WLAN does not only allow operators to increase peak data rate and system capacity, but also to offer services for non-cellular devices, such as laptops.

To cater to operators demand, 3GPP have defined various methods for integrating WLAN access into operator's network deployments.

Based on how the WLAN access is integrated in the operator network there are two categories: 1) Core Network integration, in which the WLAN access is connected to the operator core network using either S2a or S2b interfaces) available in 3GPP networks since Release 8 and 2) RAN based integration in which the WLAN access is directly connected to RAN access nodes (eg. LWA or LWIP) available since Release 13. All of the above methods of integration assume a certain level of service continuity as well as the terminal devices being always under a licensed spectrum cellular coverage. When service continuity is not assumed the WLAN access it is said to be integrated through what is called Non-Seamless WLAN Offload (NSWO).

A terminal device may access either cellular or WLAN access or both. This procedure may be either network initiated or terminal initiated. When it is network initiated it may be either based on core network signaling (eg. NAS in the case of Network based IP flow mobility) or RAN based rules. Terminal based initiated procedures are based on either operator policies provided to the terminals (eg. through ANDSF), user based policies/preferences, etc. These policies may take into account various conditions (eg. time, location, network load, access load, radio conditions, etc.) in determining both the access selection as well as traffic switching from one access to another.

In LTE - WLAN Aggregation (eg. LWA or LWIP) the WLAN access is directly connected to RAN access nodes and the access selection and traffic steering/splitting is done entirely under the control of the Radio Access Network node (eg. eNB).

== LWA in depth ==
From the network perspective, there are two options that provide flexibility when looking at deploying LWA - collocated and non-collocated. In the former, the WLAN Access Point (AP) or Access Controller (AC) is physically integrated with the LTE eNB, whereas in the latter the WLAN network (i.e. APs and/or ACs) are connected to the LTE eNB via an external network interface (Xw).

LWA design primarily follows LTE Dual Connectivity (DC) architecture [3] as defined in 3GPP Release 12, which allows a UE to connect to multiple base stations simultaneously, with WLAN used instead of LTE Secondary eNB (SeNB).

In the user plane, LTE and WLAN are aggregated at the Packet Data Convergence Protocol (PDCP) level. In the downlink, the eNB may schedule PDCP PDUs of the same bearer to be delivered to the UE either via LTE or WLAN. This is possible as the PDCP layer can re-order packets received from both LTE and WLAN links, which in its turn results in substantial performance gains. In order to perform efficient scheduling and to assign packets to LTE and WLAN links in the most efficient manner, the eNB can receive radio information about both links, including flow control indication. In order to avoid changes to the WLAN MAC, LWA uses an EtherType allocated for this purpose, so that LWA traffic is transparent to WLAN AP.

In the control plane, Evolved Node B (eNB) is responsible for LWA activation, de-activation and the decision as to which bearers are offloaded to the WLAN. It does so using WLAN measurement information reported by the UE. Once LWA is activated, the eNB configures the UE with a list of WLAN identifiers (referred to as the WLAN Mobility Set) within which the UE can move without notifying the network. This is a tradeoff between fully network controlled mobility and fully UE controlled mobility.

Even though WLAN usage in LWA is controlled by cellular network, UE has the option to "opt out" in order to use home WLAN (in case UE does not support concurrent WLAN operation). Generally, the design tries to balance between LTE technology which is traditionally network-controlled and WLAN technology, which normally allows a lot of freedom for the terminal (e.g. in terms of network selection and traffic steering). With LWA design, the high level decision (e.g. LWA activation) is performed by the network, but there is sufficient level of UE freedom and flexibility (within the limits set by the network).

The first LWA version defined in Release-14 supported downlink aggregation only. This has been further enhanced in Release-15 with uplink aggregation and support for 60 GHz band (a.k.a. WiGig).

== LWA performance ==
Some contributions use simulations of small cell deployments supporting both cellular and WLAN coverage using LWA. It shows that by using bearer split LWA improves the average as well as the cell edge user perceived throughput across all small cell users in the system when compared to the Rel-12/Rel-13 radio interworking schemes. In these schemes the WLAN is connected through the operator's core network instead of being anchored in the Radio access and the traffic may be switched from one access to another based on the radio conditions of the access including the load of the access. It is not clear though how much improvement LWA may bring when it is compared with other RAN based LTE-WLAN Aggregation solution (eg. LWIP).

== Deployments ==
On 19 August 2016 Singapore's M1 announced Singapore’s first commercial HetNet (Heterogeneous Network) rollout, including LWA. Through leading edge LTE-WiFi Aggregation (LWA) technology, M1 expects to deliver peak download speeds of more than 1 Gbit/s by 2017.

Chunghwa Telecom (CHT) will open a commercial LTE/Wi-Fi Aggregation (LWA) network on February 23, making it the world's first telecom operator to launch LWA, according to CHT. LWA technology standards were approved by 3GPP in June 2016.
