= Qiniq (company) =

Internet service provider to Nunavut, Canada

- Industry: Communication
- Founded: 2005; 21 years ago
- Headquarters: Nunavut, Canada
- Services: Internet access (broadband, satellite)
- Parent: SSi Canada
- Website: www.qiniq.com

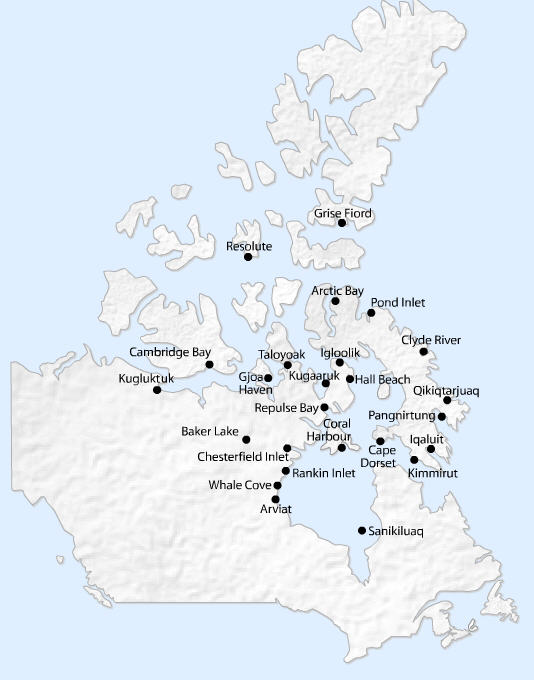
Qiniq's coverage area. Qiniq serves all 25 communities across Nunavut

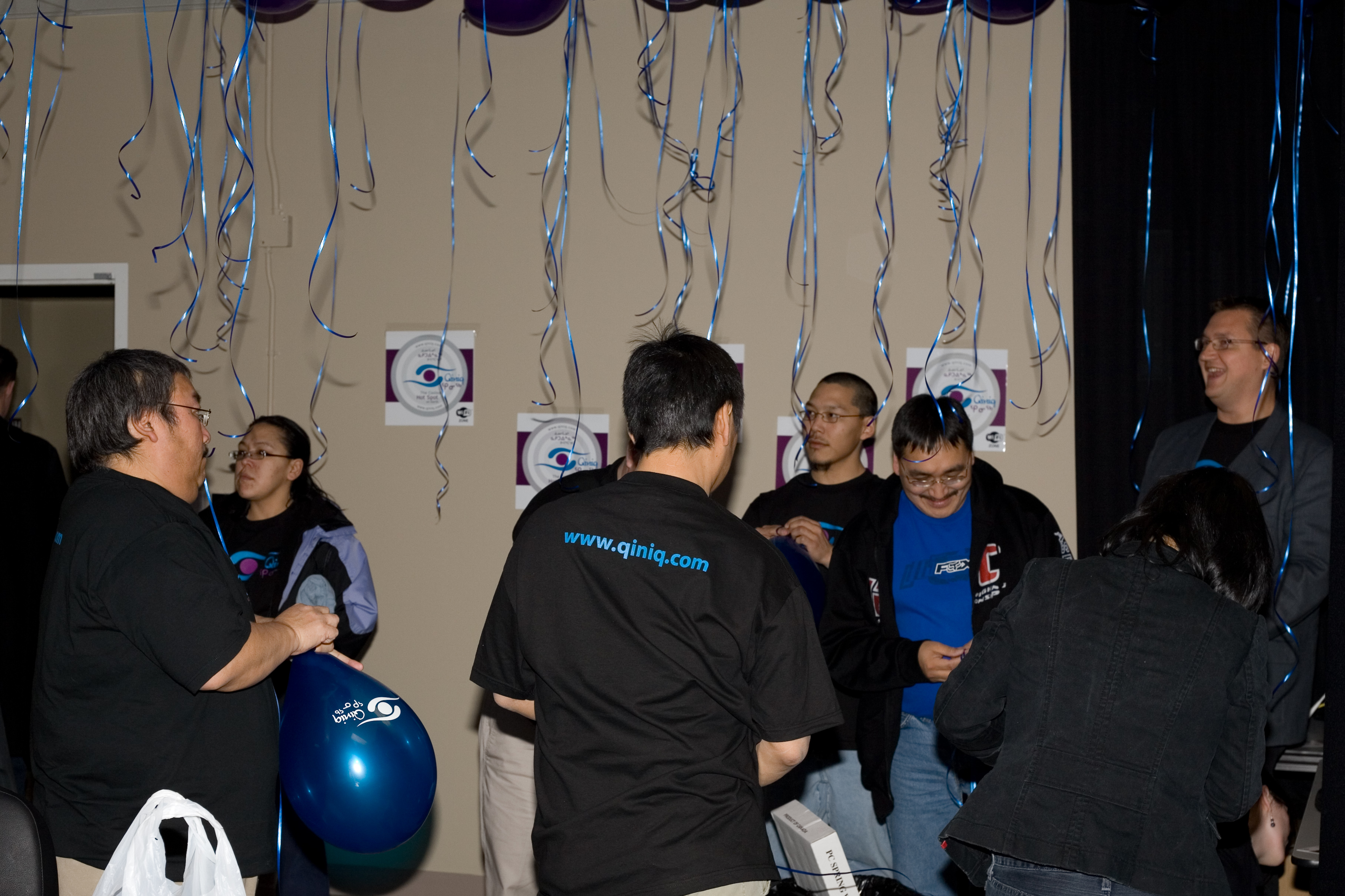
Qiniq employees from throughout Nunavut

Qiniq Inc. is a Canadian telecommunications company, which uses satellite and wireless communications technology to provide broadband Internet service to remote communities in Nunavut. The Qiniq network serves all 25 municipalities in Nunavut with satellite and wireless broadband internet services. Its name comes from the Inuktitut root word for "to search".

== History ==
In 2005, the Wireless Communications Association (WCA) awarded Qiniq in the category of "Advanced Technology For the Underserved: Affordable Services" for provisioning underserved communities with advanced NLOS broadband wireless technology.

In 2006, Qiniq won the award "Business of the Year" at the Nunavut Business Achievement Awards, Baffin Regional Chamber of Commerce.

Since its foundation, Qiniq has upgraded its network multiple times, including the implementation of DVB-S2 receivers in 2009, and the installation of LTE technology in 2016.

In January 2014, Qiniq refunded $128,000 of monthly fees and extra charges, after overcharging approximately 600 customers for several months.

In September 2018, the company announced a successful rollout of 4G LTE and 2G-GSM technology in all 25 municipalities in Nunavut.

In March 2020, the company released a statement asking for users to limit their internet usage due to increased internet usage during the COVID-19 pandemic.

In 2024, Qiniq launched Kamotik, a plan that puts customers in control of the choice of features.

== Services ==
The Qiniq network is managed centrally by SSi Canada, which maintains the satellite infrastructure, the wireless networks, all back-end hardware as well as the billing and management systems.

The company provides services through "Community Service Providers", local residents or businesses that can sign up accounts, take payments and provide basic technical support to Qiniq's customers in Nunavut.
