= .ki =

Internet country code top-level domain for Kiribati

- Introduced: 19 April 1995
- TLD type: Country code top-level domain
- Status: Active
- Registry: Communications Commission of Kiribati
- Sponsor: Ministry of Communications, Transport, and Tourism Development
- Intended use: Entities connected with Kiribati
- Actual use: Sees some use in Kiribati; rarely used as a domain hack
- Structure: Registrations are directly at second level or at third level beneath second-level labels
- Documents: Registration Service Agreement
- Registry website: cck.ki/services/domain-name

.ki is the Internet country code top-level domain (ccTLD) for Kiribati.

From the early 1990s to the early 2000s the domain was managed on behalf of the Republic of Kiribati by Connect.com.au, an Australian ISP, with the Pacific Islands Forum Fisheries Agency, based in Honiara, Solomon Islands as original sponsor, then transferred to the Ministry of Fisheries and Marine Resources Development of Kiribati and finally to the Ministry of Communications, Transport, and Tourism Development. In 2002 direct management of the ccTLD was transferred to Telecom Services Kiribati Limited. This initial set up was done by Franck Martin. As of 2007, the registry is being handled by the Telecommunications Authority of Kiribati using a system of multiple registrars similar to that used by gTLDs; however, few sites are using .ki domains. Because of the location of Kiribati and limited Internet connection, it is not uncommon for a website in Kiribati, such as a government website, to be very slow or inaccessible; however, many .ki sites are hosted outside Kiribati.

.ki is a member of CoCCA, a group of country-code domains making use of common registry and/or dispute resolution services.

== Second-level domains ==
Domains can be registered directly under .ki, or at the third level beneath com.ki, biz.ki, net.ki, info.ki, org.ki, gov.ki, edu.ki, mob.ki, and tel.ki. The fee for a second-level domain is AUD1,000, whilst all others with the exception of edu.ki, which costs AUD50, are AUD150. edu.ki and gov.ki and reserved for their respective entities in Kiribati, such as The University of the South Pacific, Kiribati Centre.
