= Zamtel =

State-owned telecommunication service provider in Zambia

Zambia Telecommunications Company Limited
- Company type: State-owned enterprise
- Industry: Telecommunications
- Founded: 1994
- Headquarters: Lusaka; 15°24′57″S 28°17′44″E
- Key people: Jason Mwanza (CEO)
- Products: Telecommunications services Internet services Landline services Cellularphone services
- Revenue: approx. K400 billion annually
- Number of employees: approx. 750

Zamtel, whose official name is Zambia Telecommunications Company Limited, is a government-owned telecommunication service provider in Zambia. Zamtel is one of three mobile phone networks in the country; the others are Airtel and MTN.

== Company overview ==
Zambia Telecommunications Company Limited is a Company incorporated in Zambia under the Companies Act Chapter 388 of the Laws of Zambia. The sole shareholder of the Company is the Government of the Republic of Zambia. The Company falls under the jurisdiction of the Ministry of Transport, Works, Supply and Communications pursuant to Gazette Notice No. 183 of 2012 and the Statutory Functions Act Chapter 4 of the Laws of Zambia.

== History ==
The first telephone exchange was installed in Livingstone, as part of the General Post Office (GPO). In 1975, the GPO transformed into the Zambian Post and Telecommunication Corporation (PTC).

In July 1994 the government of Zambia passed a Telecommunications Act that led to the splitting up of the Post and Telecommunications Corporation into two separate companies: the Zambia Postal Services Corporation (Zampost), and the Zambia Telecommunications Company (Zamtel). The Company falls under the jurisdiction of the Ministry of Transport, Works, Supply and Communications of Zambia.

In 2010, the Zambian government, under the Movement for Multi-Party Democracy (MMD) President, Rupiah Banda, sold 75% of the Zamtel to the Libyan company LAP Green Networks. The government claimed it had done so in order to keep Zamtel from shutting down after plans to recapitalize it had failed. This was a contentious move however, as some critics claimed the company was still economically viable. The 2011 Zambian national election saw the incumbent MMD party replaced by the opposition Patriotic Front (PF). The newly elected government, under President Michael Sata, set out an inquiry into the sale of Zamtel because they believed it was sold fraudulently by the previous government. The inquiry produced a report that showed irregularities in the manner in which Zamtel was sold, alleging that LAP Green and RP Capitals, which was appointed as financial advisor, bribed senior Zambian government officials; an allegation that both LAP Green and RP Capitals denied. As a result of the findings, President Michael Sata ordered a reversal of the $257 million deal and the government of Zambia seized control of Zamtel.

In 2013, LAP Green sued the government of Zambia in a British court in order to reclaim ownership of Zamtel. The Zambian government agreed that it would compensate LAP Green for its investments, but it would not let ownership of the company be transferred back to the Libyan operator.

== Location ==
The head office of the company is located in Zamtel House, at the corner of Chilubi Road and Church Road, in the Zambian capital city of Lusaka. The coordinates of Zamtel House are 15°24′57″S 28°17′44″E.

== Services ==
Services offered by the company include the following:

- Zamtel Land-line Services: Zamtel is the sole fixed-line service provider with approximately 80,000 lines country-wide
- Zamtel Prepaid: Prepaid mobile phone service that allows users to top-up minutes using scratch cards
- Zamtel Mobile Internet: Internet access for mobile devices or computers.
- Zamtel International Roaming service: International roaming service that allows users to stay connected wherever they are in the world.

=== Zamtel Velocity ===
In October 2019 Zamtel launched a new unlimited data bundle packages. The service is available on Routers and MiFis.

== Corporate governance ==
The Industrial Development Corporation in August 2017 appointed a new board of directors for Zamtel.
