= SSi Canada =

- Type: Private
- Industry: Telecommunication
- Founded: 1990 in Fort Providence
- Founder: Jeffrey Philipp
- Headquarters: Yellowknife, Northwest Territories, Canada
- Services: Internet access (broadband, satellite)
- Website: ssicanada.com

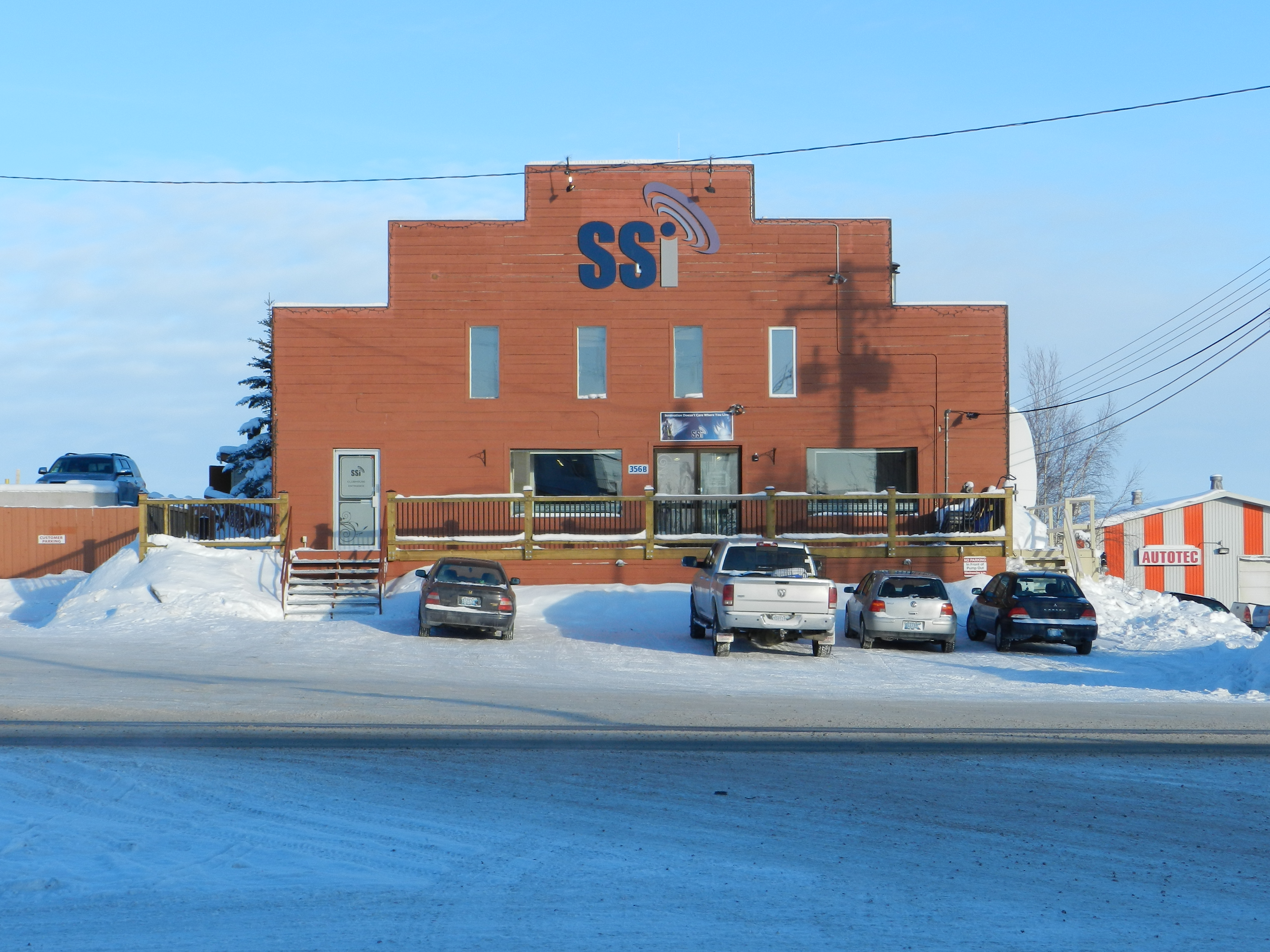
SSi Canada's offices in Yellowknife

SSi Canada (formerly known as SSi Micro Ltd.) is a Canadian wireless broadband internet service provider primarily serving remote areas that lack terrestrial service options. SSi was established in 1990 by Jeffrey Philipp and is headquartered in Yellowknife, capital of the Northwest Territories. SSi is also a provider of Satellite Communication services, offered in locations that do not have terrestrial service options. They offer turnkey Internet systems to other ISPs. They have a local market serving all 25 communities in Nunavut and several in the Northwest Territories. These two territories account for 1/3 of Canada's landmass covering 3,439,296 km^{2} (1,327,920 sq mi). They also have an international market including Africa, Indonesia and Kiribati.

SSi Canada has used the Motorola Expedience line of product to deliver licensed broadband Internet services for many years, transmitted over a licensed spectrum of 2.5-2.6 GHz in Canada. The Expedience system consist of base stations that deliver a Wireless signal throughout the community, and of residential subscriber units (or RSUs) that are provided to customers, which receive the signal from the base stations. In 2016-17, SSi upgraded their network to 4G-LTE wireless and mobile technology.

== History ==
SSi Canada (formerly known as SSi Micro) was founded in 1990 in Fort Providence. They provided businesses with a fully equipped sales, training and technical service centre along with computer sales and repairs. At this time SSi became the 13th division of a much larger group of companies operated by the Philipp family since 1965. This group of companies offered a vast range of services and employment opportunity in the community of Fort Providence, including the Snowshoe Inn, coffee shop and gift shop. For many years the company also operated the ferry that provided the only road access from southern Canada to the Northwest Territories prior to the opening of the Deh Cho Bridge.

SSI Micro was one of the first Internet Service Providers (ISP's) in Northern Canada. They opened a branch in Yellowknife in 1995.

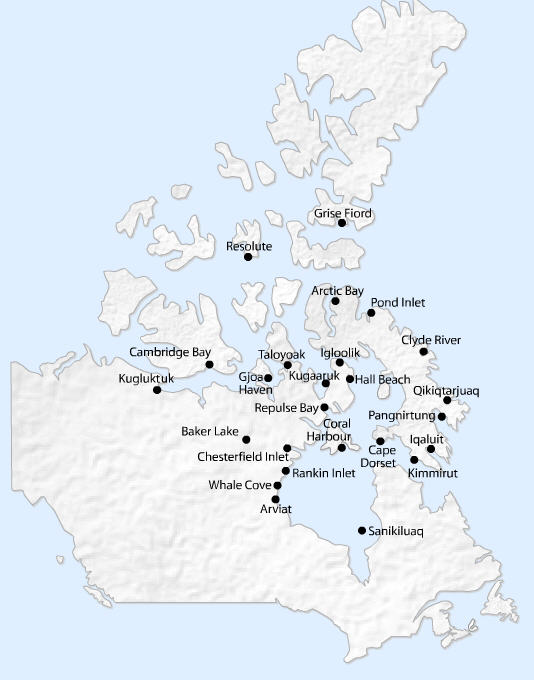
SSi Canada's Qiniq network coverage Area. Providing All 25 Nunavut Communities with broadband Internet services.

== Canadian services ==
As of February 2008, SSi was the largest ISP in Northern Canada providing broadband Internet services in all 25 Nunavut Communities under the Qiniq brand, and in 31 Communities throughout the Northwest Territories under the Airware brand.

SSi often uses Connecting the North and "People. Ideas. Technology." as their advertising slogans.

In March 2004, SSi launched the first commercial Canadian implementation of 2.5 GHz NLOS (non line of sight) wireless broadband Internet service in Yellowknife.

Industry Canada's Broadband for Rural and Northern Development (BRAND) program became the catalyst for the creation of Nunavut Broadband Development Corporation (NBDC), a not for profit group tasked with identifying the Nunavut's broadband needs. At this time, outside of government worker connections in the 11 largest communities, Internet was not readily available to Nunavut residents.

NBDC issued a comprehensive request for proposal (RFP) to vendors and put the financing together for building a network to serve the needs of the people of Nunavut. SSi won this RFP in the spring of 2004. As a result of winning this RFP, SSi designed and deployed the Qiniq network

In 2005, SSi officially launched the Qiniq network. This network provides broadband services to all 25 communities in Nunavut. Inuit comprise 85% of the population of Nunavut and are avid users of broadband services. Broadband is used to improve the educational, economic, social and cultural opportunities in the territory. Many e-commerce and informational web sites are now readily available online from businesses based in Nunavut.

The Qiniq network is managed centrally by SSi out of their head office in Yellowknife. SSi maintains the satellite infrastructure, the wireless networks, all back-end hardware as well as the billing and management.

SSi does not sell to end users directly. Qiniq services are offered in each Nunavut community by a local resident, which are referred to as community service providers, or "CSP". In each community there is a local resident who is trained and contracted to provide services in their respective community. The CSPs sign up users, take payments and provide technical support to their clients. CSPs deal with SSi in Yellowknife directly for their training and support. CSPs provide Qiniq clients the ability to deal with someone local, typically a long-time Northern resident who understands the culture and language of their community.

SSi offers services in the following communities in Nunavut, under the brand name Qiniq:

Gjoa Haven	Kugaaruk	Cambridge Bay	Sanikiluaq	Baker Lake	Arctic Bay	Rankin Inlet	Taloyoak
Kugluktuk	Igloolik	Hall Beach	Cape Dorset	Coral Harbour	Clyde River	Naujaat	Pangnirtung
Kimmirut	Pond Inlet	Arviat	Whale Cove	Chesterfield Inlet	Grise Fiord	Qikiqtarjuaq	Resolute

In 2006, SSi Launched the AirWare network. This network was similar in design to the Qiniq network and provided broadband services to 30 communities in the Northwest Territories. The AirWare network also had a local representative in each of the communities that processed payments and provided technical support to their local clients. As with the Qiniq network, the CSPs provided AirWare clients the ability to deal with someone local, typically a long-time northern resident who understands the culture and language of their community. However, federal funding for the Airware project ceased in 2010, and over the next few years SSI had no choice but to gradually wind down service in those communities.

SSi offered services in the following communities in the Northwest Territories, under the brand name AirWare:

Wekweeti	Behchoko	Ulukhaktok	Lutselk'e	Colville Lake	Sachs Harbour	Paulatuk	Dettah
Deline	Fort Providence	Gamèti	Fort Simpson	Hay River	Nahanni Butte	N'Dilo	Whatì

In 2010, SSi was selected by the Government of Nunavut to provide, maintain and operate its Wide Area Network (WAN), ensuring Internet and Intranet connectivity for all government departments.

In 2012, SSi established its own state-of-the-art ground station satellite teleport in Ottawa. Having previously leased southern teleport facilities, SSi now had its own location connecting the north to the world's Internet backbone.

=== The Fight for Fair Competition ===
For the past many years, SSi has championed the cause for fair pricing and open competition in the northern communications market. SSi has been demanding better service for consumers in a series of regulatory proceedings before the Canadian Radio-television and Telecommunications Commission (CRTC). In 2011, SSI filed a complaint with the CRTC on Northwestel's pricing for backbone connectivity, the essential fibre communications link between northern Canada and the rest of the world. SSI also presented detailed concerns at CRTC hearings regarding Northwestel's monopoly operations, whereby shareholders were benefiting from the existing regulatory framework much more than consumers. As a result, the CRTC had ordered Northwestel to lower its wholesale rates and upgrade its ageing network to provide better services to the public. As well, the CRTC has been conducting a holistic review into the regulatory framework for the North.

== International services ==
- New Year's Eve 2004, SSi worked with the Global Development Group to deploy a mobile broadcast system in Banda Aceh and Jakarta to assist emergency relief in Indonesia. Satellite networks were deployed in both Banda Aceh and Jakarta to enable relief workers and other non-governmental organizations (NGO's) to access the Internet and utilize Voice over IP technologies in order to improve communications with the rest of the world, and to assist with coordination of aid within the country.
- In 2005, SSi supplied a turn-key ISP system in Kiribati for Telecom Services Kiribati Limited (TSKL). Kiribati is an island nation located in the central tropical Pacific Ocean straddling the equator. Kiribati resides on 33 atolls dispersed over 3,500,000 km^{2} (1,400,000 sq mi). Services were installed in the three largest centers, Betio, Bairiki, and Bikenibeu.

== Awards and highlights ==
- SSI Micro in a joint venture with the NWT Power Corporation won the Next Generation Solution Award at the Canadian Information Productivity Awards (CIPA) in 2000. This satellite network was the first of its kind to be built in Canada and fifth in the World.
- SSI Micro's Qiniq Network was awarded at the Wireless Communications Association International (WCA) for provisioning underserved communities with NLOS broadband wireless technology in 2005.
- SSI Micro was the first company in Canada to launch a Wireless NLOS Broadband Network.
- In 2006, SSI Micro's Qiniq network was named "Business of the Year" by the Baffin Chamber of Commerce at the Nunavut Business Achievement Awards.
- In 2005, SSi Micro's QINIQ network was designated as an "Intelligent Community" by the Intelligent Community Forum, a New York City based think tank.
- In 2018, SSi Mobile, managed by SSi Micro, won the Startup Canada High Growth Award in the North Startup Canada Awards.

== Sponsorships ==
SSi Canada is listed as a sponsor for several local non profit associations.

- Folk on the Rocks - Yellowknife's annual music festival
- Yellowknife Montessori School - alternative education
- NWT Amateur Speed Skating Association
