= Surfline Communications =

Surfline Communications Limited
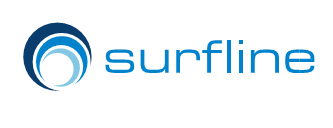
- Company type: Private ownership
- Industry: Telecommunications
- Founded: 2011; 15 years ago
- Headquarters: Accra, Tema, Takoradi, Kasoa Ghana
- Area served: List: Kumasi, Ashanti Region Sunyani, Brong-Ahafo Cape Coast, Central Region Koforidua, Eastern Region Accra, Greater Accra Sekondi-Takoradi, Western Region
- Key people: John E. Taylor (Chairman)
- Products: 4G Long Term Evolution (LTE) Network and WiFi Network, broadband and fixed-line internet services, dedicated internet service, IT and network services
- Services: Dedicated Internet Service (fibre and microwave radio), 4G LTE, Events & Conferences, Public WiFi, VPN, I.P Dedication, Outdoor Units and Broadcast Systems.
- Owner: John E. Taylor
- Website: www.surflinegh.com

Surfline Communications Limited (commonly known as Surfline), is a Ghanaian internet service provider and WiFi network service company, providing 4G LTE and WiFi services.

== History ==
Surfline Communications Limited was established in 2011, and they received their license from the National Communications Authority (NCA) that same year. The Surfline licenses terms ensured that Surfline must have provided 4G Long Term Evolution (LTE) network in Accra, Tema and Takoradi.

== 4G LTE and WiFi ==
Surfline has built a Long Term Evolution (LTE) network. Surfline is the designated 4G LTE network and WiFi network provider in Ghana
