= Ice Wireless =

Northern Canadian telecommunications company

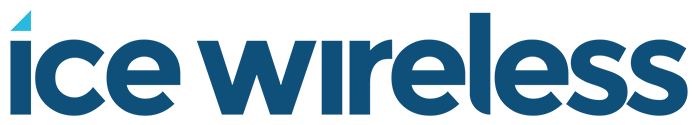
- Type: Private
- Industry: Mobile network operator
- Founded: September 2005
- Headquarters: Markham, Ontario, Canada
- Areas served: Yukon, Northwest Territories, Nunavut
- Key people: Samer Bishay - President & CEO, Cameron Zubko - Chief Operating Officer
- Products: 4G/LTE mobility services, mobile broadband Internet, fixed line telephone
- Number of employees: 150
- Parent: Iristel
- Website: www.icewireless.com

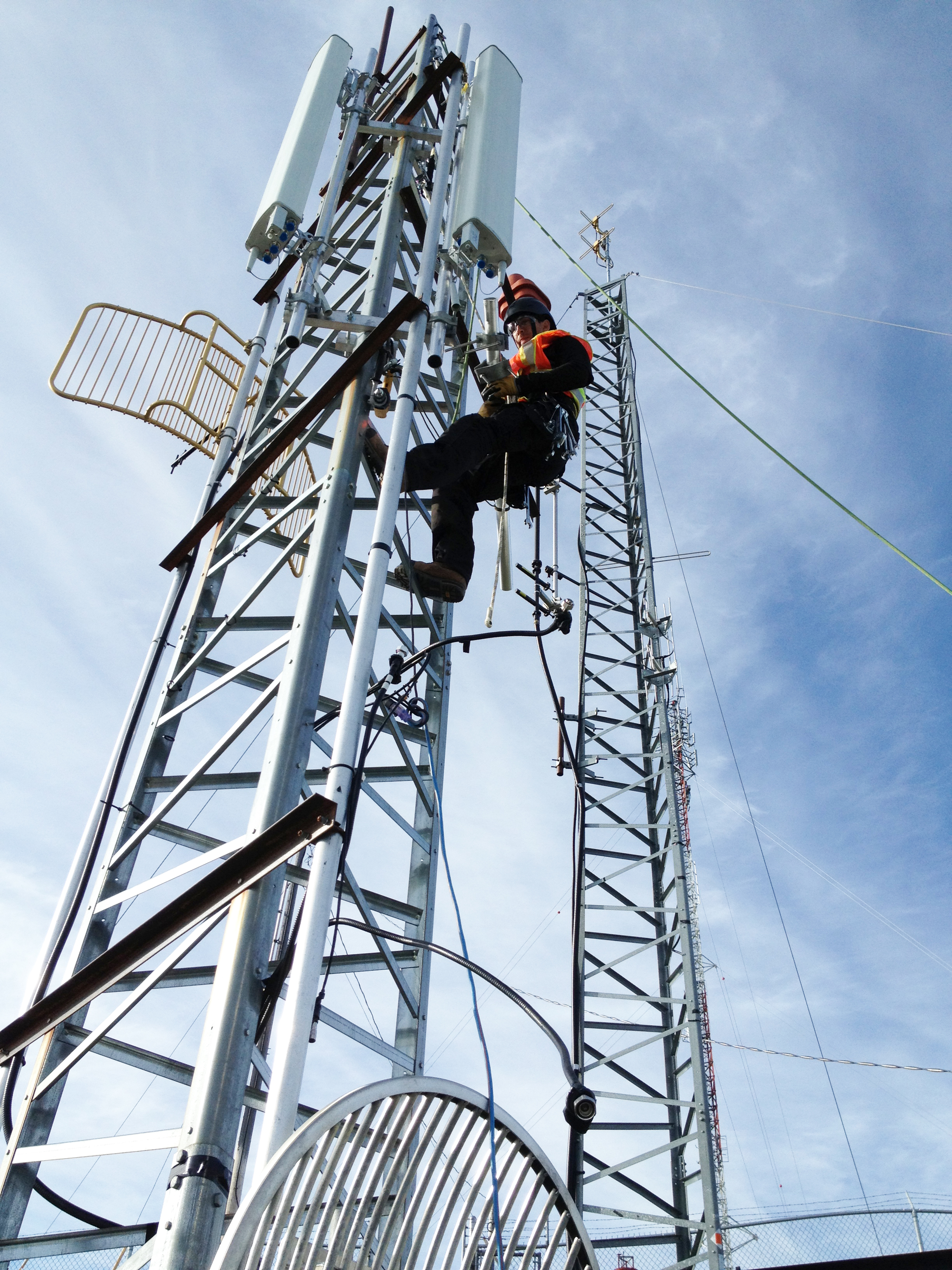
Ice Wireless Building 3G HSPA+ base station

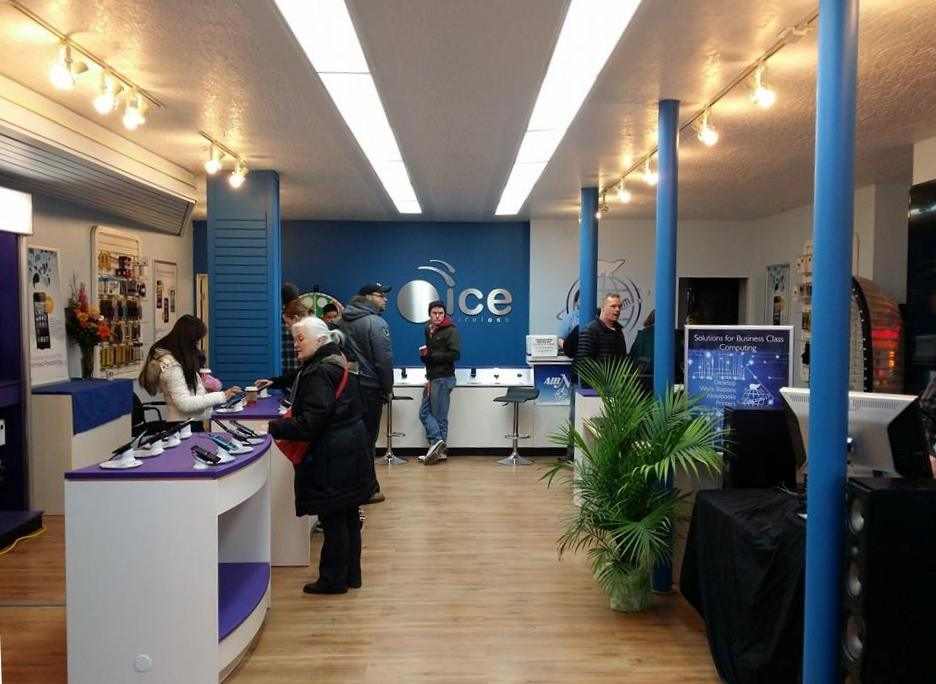
Former Ice Wireless Retail Store in Whitehorse, Yukon

Ice Wireless is a Canadian mobile network operator and telecommunications company that provides 4G/LTE mobility services, mobile broadband Internet, and fixed line telephone in Canada's northern territories: Yukon, the Northwest Territories, Nunavut, and Nunavik, Quebec. The company's corporate headquarters are located in Markham, Ontario.

== History ==
Ice Wireless was launched in 2005 to serve rural and remote communities in Northern Canada. The network was first developed in the community of Inuvik, Northwest Territories, a base for oil and gas exploration located approximately 100 km (62 mi) from the Arctic Ocean and 200 km (120 mi) north of the Arctic Circle. The network was the first GSM system in Northern Canada, originally designed as a "small cell" system that could be scaled down and economically deployed to rural and remote communities. Due to the scalability of its technology, Ice Wireless could offer mobility service in locations that could not be economically reached by larger telecommunications companies. Ice Wireless was the first to launch mobility service in Inuvik, Aklavik and Behchoko (Rae-Edzo) in the Northwest Territories. As customers increased, Ice Wireless expanded service to include Yellowknife, Northwest Territories.

In 2012, Ice Wireless announced a $12.4 million network upgrade to roll out 3G/4G Evolved High Speed Packet Access (HSPA+) across the three Canadian territories.

In 2013, Ice Wireless became the first mobile network operator to launch 3G/4G services to Iqaluit, Nunavut. These services were launched using SES' AMC-9 satellite. In 2017, Ice Wireless became the first mobile operator to launch LTE service to Iqaluit, Nunavut.

In 2019, Ice Wireless launched 3G LTE service in Kuujjuaq, Quebec and Quaqtaq, Quebec as part of a larger roll-out to all 14 communities of the Nunavik region of Northern Quebec.

The Ice Wireless network now extends across Canada's North and includes areas in the Yukon, Northwest Territories, Nunavut and the Nunavik region of Northern Quebec.

== Services ==
- 4G/LTE Mobility Services
- Mobile Broadband Internet
- Fixed Line Telephone

== Retail stores ==
Ice Wireless operates its own corporate retail stores, and also conducts business through a network of agents that operate in each local market. Ice Wireless provides 24/7 customer care and technical support for its customers, as well as 9-1-1 service.

== Network ==
As a Mobile Network Operator (MNO) Ice Wireless owns and operates communication towers, facilities and radio access network equipment in all three Canadian territories.

Ice Wireless is a member of the GSM Association (GSMA).

== Coverage ==
Ice Wireless offers 4G LTE network coverage in Yukon, Northwest Territories, Nunavut, and Northern Quebec.

City or Town	Territory	Service	
City or Town	Territory	4G/LTE	Internet
Whitehorse	Yukon	Yes	Yes
Inuvik	Northwest Territories	Yes	Yes
Tuktoyaktuk	Northwest Territories	Yes	Yes
Norman Wells	Northwest Territories	Yes	Yes
Yellowknife	Northwest Territories	Yes	Yes
Dettah	Northwest Territories	Yes	Yes
Behchoko	Northwest Territories	Yes	Yes
Hay River	Northwest Territories	Yes	Yes
Fort Smith	Northwest Territories	No	No
Iqaluit	Nunavut	Yes	Yes
Kuujjuaq	Quebec	Yes	No
Quaqtaq	Quebec	Yes	No

== Roaming ==
Ice Wireless customers may use smartphones and devices across Canada, the United States and internationally through the company's network of roaming partnerships, including Bell, Rogers Wireless, Telus, Vidéotron Mobile, and AT&T.

== Smartphones ==
As of 2020 Ice Wireless offers the following smartphones for use on its network.

- Apple iPhone (several models)
- Samsung Galaxy (several models)

== ICE home phone services ==
Ice Wireless offers the ICE home phone service, which provides customers with a home telephone line.

== Mobile Broadband Services ==
Ice Wireless offers two mobile broadband products that provide high speed internet service, wireless and home Internet. The wireless service comes with either an Aircard 763S that allows up to 10 Wi-Fi devices or a BEC 6300 modem, both with 4G/LTE download speeds. Ice Wireless also offers home Internet plans.

== Relationship with Iristel ==
In 2012, Ice Wireless established a strategic partnership with Iristel, Canada's largest CLEC and VoIP service provider.

== See also ==
- Bell Canada
- Northwestel
- List of Canadian mobile phone companies
