= LTE in unlicensed spectrum =

Proposed extension of a wireless standard

LTE in unlicensed spectrum (LTE-Unlicensed, LTE-U) is an extension of the Long-Term Evolution (LTE) wireless standard that allows cellular network operators to offload some of their data traffic by accessing the unlicensed 5 GHz frequency band. LTE-Unlicensed is a proposal, originally developed by Qualcomm, for the use of the 4G LTE radio communications technology in unlicensed spectrum, such as the 5 GHz band used by 802.11a and 802.11ac compliant Wi-Fi equipment. It would serve as an alternative to carrier-owned Wi-Fi hotspots. Currently, there are a number of variants of LTE operation in the unlicensed band, namely LTE-U, License Assisted Access (LAA), MulteFire, sXGP and CBRS.

== LTE in Unlicensed spectrum (LTE-U) ==
The first version of LTE-Unlicensed is called LTE-U and is developed by the LTE-U Forum to work with the existing 3GPP Releases 10/11/12. LTE-U was designed for quick launch in countries, such as the United States and China, that do not mandate implementing the listen-before-talk (LBT) technique. LTE-U would allow cellphone carriers to boost coverage in their cellular networks, by using the unlicensed 5 GHz band already populated by Wi-Fi devices.

LTE-U is intended to let cell networks boost data speeds over short distances, without requiring the user to use a separate Wi-Fi network as they normally would. It differs from Wi-Fi calling; there remains a control channel using LTE, but all data (not just phone calls) flows over the unlicensed 5 GHz band, instead of the carrier's frequencies.

In 2014, the LTE-U Forum was created by Verizon, in conjunction with Alcatel-Lucent, Ericsson, Qualcomm, and Samsung as members. The forum collaborates and creates technical specifications for base stations and consumer devices passing LTE-U on the unlicensed 5 GHz band, as well as coexistence specs to handle traffic contention with existing Wi-Fi devices.

T-Mobile and Verizon Wireless have indicated early interest in deploying such a system as soon as 2016. While cell providers ordinarily rely on the radio spectrum to which they have exclusive licenses, LTE-U would share space with Wi-Fi equipment already inhabiting that band – smartphones, laptops and tablets connecting to home broadband networks, free hotspots provided by businesses, and so on.

As of late January 2019, there were three LTE-U deployed/launched networks in three countries; eight further operators are investing in the technology in the form of trials or pilots in seven countries.

== License Assisted Access (LAA) ==
The second variant of LTE-Unlicensed is Licensed Assisted Access (LAA) and has been standardized by the 3GPP in Rel-13. LAA adheres to the requirements of the LBT protocol, which is mandated in Europe and Japan. It promises to provide a unified global framework that complies with the regulatory requirements in the different regions of the world.

- 3GPP Rel-13 defines LAA only for the downlink (DL).
- 3GPP Rel-14 defines enhanced-Licensed Assisted Access (eLAA), which includes uplink (UL) operation in the unlicensed channel.
- 3GPP Rel-15 The technology continued to be developed in 3GPP's release 15 under the title Further Enhanced LAA (feLAA).

Ericsson uses the term License Assisted Access (LAA) to describe similar technology. LAA is the 3rd Generation Partnership Project's (3GPP) effort to standardize operation of LTE in the Wi-Fi bands. It uses a contention protocol known as listen-before-talk (LBT), mandated in some European countries, to coexist with other Wi-Fi devices on the same band.

== MulteFire ==
MulteFire is another variant of LTE in unlicensed bands and has been proposed as a standalone version of LTE for small cells. This variant will use only the unlicensed spectrum as the primary and only carrier, and it will provide an opportunity for neutral hosts to deploy LTE in the future. The idea of standalone operation of LTE in unlicensed bands was originally proposed by a small minority of vendors in 3GPP but rejected by the network operators who wanted the technology to be reliant on their licensed spectrum holdings. This technology is now developed by the MuLTEfire Alliance.

== Controversy ==
The proposed use of LTE-U by mobile phone network operators is the subject of controversy in the telecommunications industry. In June 2015, Google sent the Federal Communications Commission (FCC) of the United States a 25-page protest, making an argument against LTE-U in highly technical detail. Since Google's study did not use actual LTE-U equipment in the tests, some industry experts have called its conclusions into question, with one commenter calling the study "utterly artificial and speculative" and "embarrassing".

In August 2015, the Wi-Fi Alliance and National Cable & Telecommunications Association (NCTA) also voiced opposition to LTE-U approval before more testing can be done, citing concerns that it would severely degrade performance of other Wi-Fi devices. Also in August 2015, Qualcomm responded to the allegations made in Google's whitepaper in a detailed filing with the FCC. Qualcomm stated that it conducted tests that were "specifically designed to replicate (to the fullest extent possible) the test scenarios cited in Google’s FCC filing, in particular", and that they "collectively showed that LTE-U coexists very well with Wi-Fi when LTE-U is operating either above or below Wi-Fi’s Energy Detect ('ED') level." Qualcomm explained that the divergence in results was caused by the fact that "the testing the opposing parties conducted for LTE-U/Wi-Fi coexistence below the ED level utilized extremely pessimistic and impractical technical assumptions", whereas Qualcomm's tests were conducted "using a far more realistic setup", including actual LTE-U equipment (versus signal generators in Google's study).

In May 2016, the New York City Mayor's Office sent a letter to the FCC, 3GPP, Wi-Fi Alliance, and IEEE, expressing concern over LTE-U interference with Wi-Fi, given the City's broad investment in the technology. These concerns were discussed at a public event.

In June 2016 the Wi-Fi Alliance announced its co-existence test plan would be ready in August. In FCC filings, Qualcomm, Verizon and T-Mobile said they plan to use this plan, some with the aim of full implementation before the end of 2016. However, in August 2016, Qualcomm demurred. “The latest version of the test plan released by the Wi-Fi Alliance lacks technical merit, is fundamentally biased against LTE-U, and rejects virtually all the input that Qualcomm provided for the last year, even on points that were not controversial,” said Dean Brenner, senior vice president of government affairs. Qualcomm asserts that the plan biased in favor of Wi-Fi, and also that the testing regimen is extended to cover not just LTE-U, but also LAA, despite it already being a 3GPP standard. Verizon also opposed the test plan, saying it was "fundamentally unfair and biased".

Research from the University of Chicago in 2021 also showed a marked decrease in Wi-FI performance when LAA was in active use.

== Deployments ==
In November 2016 Verizon, separate to the Wi-Fi Alliance coexistence plan, filed a Special Temporary Authority (STA) application with the FCC to test 40 small cells in the 5 GHz band. According to a separate filing, Verizon will conduct the tests in Oklahoma City, Raleigh and Cary, North Carolina, and Irving, Texas.

In February 2017, the FCC approved the use of LTE-U on base stations manufactured by Ericsson and Nokia.

As of June 26, 2017, T-Mobile declared that they have successfully launched LTE-U in Bellevue, Washington; Brooklyn, New York; Dearborn, Michigan; Las Vegas, Nevada; Richardson, Texas; and Simi Valley, California.

In January 2019, the Global Mobile Suppliers Association reported that 32 operators are investing in LAA across 21 countries; this had increased to 37 operators in 21 countries by July 2019. Eight of these have announced LAA network launches in six countries, while 29 operators are trialling or deploying the technology in 18 countries. The GSA also identified 21 chipsets containing modems that support one or more of LTE-U, LAA, LWA or CBRS from vendors including GCT, Intel, Mediatek, Qualcomm, and Samsung.

== See also ==
- Mobile data offloading
- MulteFire
- White spaces (radio)
- LTE Advanced Pro
- LTE-WLAN Aggregation, an alternative proposal that explicitly uses Wi-Fi access instead of competing with it for spectrum
