= Xplore Inc. =

Canadian internet provider

- Formerly: Barrett Xplore Inc.
- Industry: Telecommunications
- Founded: 2004; 22 years ago
- Headquarters: Woodstock, New Brunswick
- Key people: Brent Johnston (President & CEO)
- Brands: Xplore Business; Metro Loop
- Services: Satellite Internet, Fixed Wireless Internet, Fibre Internet
- Owner: Stonepeak
- ASN: 22995
- Website: xplore.ca

Xplore Inc. is a Canadian rural internet service provider. It is the largest rural focused broadband service provider in Canada.

== History ==
Xplore Inc. was founded in 2004 under the name Barrett XPlore.

In 2011, Barrett XPlore rebranded to Xplornet Communications Inc.

In April 2012, Xplore entered into a partnership with Shaw Communications to market bundles of its Shaw Direct satellite television service with Xplore internet service.

In 2014, the company purchased capacity on ViaSat-2 and EchoStar XIX as part of a plan to expand its service area to all of Canada by 2017.

In January 2017, Xplore acquired the Saskatoon-based competitor YourLink.

In November 2017, Xplore acquired Manitoba-based fixed wireless provider Netset Communications. With the deal Xplore retained the Netset brand and Netset continues to operate out of Brandon, Manitoba as a separate division of Xplore.

During the COVID-19 pandemic, Xplore customers reported increased issues with connectivity speeds. According to Lis McWalter, a Carling, Ontario resident and chair of the West Parry Sound SMART Community Network, speeds are so slow that audio calls are impeded, and said "Even at the best of times we don't get the speed that's promised."

In June 2020, Xplore announced its sale to New York private equity firm Stonepeak Infrastructure Partners. The sale did not include Xplore Mobile, which continued as a separate company before shutting down at the end of August 2022.

In September 2022, rebranded from Xplornet Communications Inc. to Xplore Inc.

== Services ==
Xplore provides fixed wireless internet access to remote areas through a combination of fibre, satellite internet as well as LTE and WiMAX fixed wireless networks. It owns part of the lifetime capacity of ViaSat-2 and is expanding its 4G and 5G network. These networks support approximately 400,000 subscribers, the largest number of rural Canadian subscribers of any company as of 2021.

As with other telecommunications companies, some Xplore programs are funded in part by federal and provincial government grants.

In September 2021, Xplore announced that it was launching Canada's first rural 5G standalone network starting in New Brunswick.

Xplore is rolling out a fibre-to-the-premise network offering speeds up to one gigabit per second in seven provinces with more projects to come. The company is investing $500 million by 2025 to deploy state-of-the-art scalable fibre Internet and fibre-powered 5G fixed wireless technology in its facilities-based network. Xplore currently has fibre projects underway in Alberta, Manitoba, Ontario, Quebec, New Brunswick, Nova Scotia and Prince Edward Island.

In November 2022, Xplore announced that residents and businesses in rural and remote regions will have access to download speeds up to 100 megabits per second (Mbps) and more data on the company's next-generation satellite service, starting in the summer of 2023.

=== Xplore Mobile ===
On February 16, 2017, Bell announced that as part of its acquisition of Manitoba Telecom Services (MTS), it would divest a portion of its wireless subscribers to Xplornet. The divestment was a condition of the deal intended to preserve the presence of four major wireless carriers in Manitoba post-merger (Bell also divested a larger portion of MTS's wireless subscribers to Telus). Xplornet would receive 24,700 MTS subscribers, as well as 6 retail locations, and wireless spectrum. Bell entered into agreements with Xplornet to provide tower access, roaming, and devices for a period of time while it establishes its new mobile network.

The new Xplore Mobile brand was announced August 1, 2018. The company claimed that its wireless services would be "built on the values of fairness, simplicity and transparency".

In July 2022, Xplornet announced that Xplore Mobile would end operations at the end of August 2022, citing it that had been impacted by "high roaming rates that significantly exceed retail prices", and regulatory delays in a new CRTC framework that would require the incumbent wireless carriers to sell wholesale access to their networks to new regional competitors for a period of time. Xplore Mobile's pricing was never competitive with that of Bell, Rogers, or Telus. Executive director of the Public Interest Advocacy Centre John Lawford argued that the divestment was not aggressive enough to make Xplore Mobile a viable competitor to the established incumbents, and that the company's failure demonstrated the federal government's lax attitude towards competition in Canada's wireless industry.
