= Red Compartida =

Mexican shared 700 MHz telecommunications network

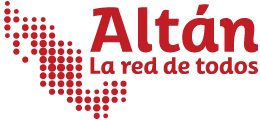

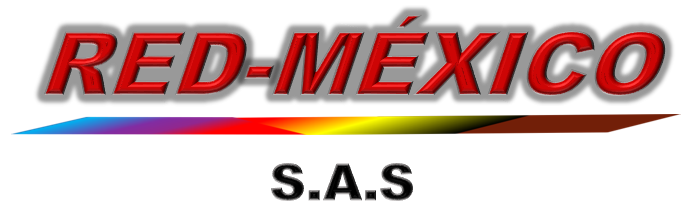
Logo of Red México

Altán Redes (English: Shared Network) is the official name of the network that resulted from the Mexican Government's 2014-2016 effort to overhaul its telecommunications industry by introducing competition into the marketplace.

The awarding body was the Mexican ministry of transport and communications, Secretariat of Infrastructure, Communications and Transportation (SICT).

Red Compartida was developed by ALTÁN Redes, a private Mexican company owned by the consortium—of the same name—that won the domestic and international public tender process.

== Background ==
América Móvil, the company owned by Carlos Slim, the world's richest person between 2010 and 2013, has long held a monopoly in the telecommunications marketplace in Mexico. In July 2014, it was reported in Forbes magazine that Slim controlled 80% of Mexico's landline market and 70% of the wireless market. According to the Los Angeles Times, Mexican consumers have long been complaining at the “high costs and spotty service” provided by Slim's companies. Over the years, Slim has been accused of engaging in anti-competitive practices – for example, using his control over the telecommunications infrastructure to charge prohibitive connection fees to competitors.

On July 9, 2014, the Mexican Government passed wide-ranging telecommunications reforms, designed to abolish long-distance phone charges, make it easier for customers to switch phone companies, and broaden access to free-to-air television stations. In response, Slim announced that he would reduce his market share substantially, and announced plans to sell off America Movil assets worth up to 7 billion dollars.

Under the new laws, the Mexican telecommunications regulator was required to establish a wholesale-only wireless network — a “carrier’s carrier” that will sell mobile-network capacity to all comers. In 2015, the regulator announced the “Red Compartida” initiative.

On November 17, 2016, Mexico's Ministry of Communications and Transportation announced that the ALTÁN Consortium won the international tender process for Red Compartida. The new wholesale network is expected to begin operations by March 31, 2018, covering 30% of the Mexican population. The network will grow to provide services nationwide using all-IP network and 4G-LTE technology on the 700 MHz spectrum band, reaching 92.2% of the Mexican population. The network concession is for a term of 20 years with an option to extend for another 20 years. On March 30, 2017, ALTÁN Networks was formally established as the operator of Red Compartida thus completing the administrative process in relation to the mandate awarded through the public tender in November 2016, and the signing of the Public-Private Partnership in January 2017.

On March 15, 2018, one year and four months after ALTÁN was granted the project, Red Compartida was authorized to start commercial operations after reaching its first coverage milestone: 30 percent of the total population and 25% of the Pueblos Mágicos.

On March 21, 2018, President Enrique Peña Nieto initiated the first stage of Red Compartida, 10 days before the deadline in the Public Private Partnership (PPP) contract.

For the rest of 2018, network deployment continues as ALTÁN Redes, works toward its next coverage milestones. The next goal is to provide coverage to 50% of the total population by 2020 (at least 56 million people, 7.9 million of them in locations with less than 10,000 inhabitants, and 56 Pueblos Mágicos).

== Wholesale network ==
The Red Compartida network will be “wholesale only”. This means that the company which builds and operates the network will not be involved in providing mobile service to consumers. Instead, the operator will provide access to the network to mobile operators, who will in turn use the network capacity to provide a consumer mobile product. Access to the network for these operators will be sold to the highest bidder in regular auctions.

The advantage of a wholesale only network is that many new entrants can enter the Mexican consumer market at once. The cost of building a mobile network is prohibitive and requires billions of dollars in capital outlay. By providing the infrastructure through a wholesale only network, the cost of offering a new consumer service to Mexican customers will be significantly reduced.

The Mexican Government expects the construction of the wholesale network, and the resultant entry of new providers to the Mexican market to generate 13 billion dollars of Foreign Direct Investment over a three-year period. The network currently operates on LTE band 28.

== International Reaction ==
The Red Compartida project received international recognition at the Mobile World Congress in Barcelona, Spain, in 2016. An award was given to Mexico for its efforts in the area of “Governmental Leadership.” According to Monica Aspe, Mexico's sub-secretary for telecommunications and transport, receipt of recognition in this area was a landmark telecommunications development in her country. She explained that, in the past, “European countries and China were almost solely the recipients of this award.”

On the other hand, the giant US provider AT&T, which has in recent years invested 4.4 billion dollars in Mexico, was reported to be “particularly discomfited” with the project, especially since as an existing operator, they would be barred from taking part.

== Antitrust requirements ==
The Mexican Government requires that any bidder planning to construct the Red Compartida Network demonstrate that they have no ties whatever to any mobile service provider already operating in Mexico.

== Timetable ==
An announcement awarding the project to the successful bidder was expected in October 2016. On November 18, ALTÁN Redes consortium was awarded the project.

== Potential bidders ==
Irish-American Firm Rivada Networks has announced that it will bid to build the Red Compartida network. Several other companies are believed to be considering bids.
