= Amalgamated Telecom Holdings Kiribati Limited =

Amalgamated Telecom Holdings Kiribati Limited (abbreviated ATHKL) is the sole communications provider to the Republic of Kiribati. Before a change of ownership, the company was known as Telecom Services Kiribati Limited or short TSKL. In addition to traditional telecommunication, ATHKL offers such services as telegram and facsimile services. Until 2007 the company maintained the country's ccTLD, .ki, which is now under the control of a separate agency, Telecommunications Authority of Kiribati.

Although originally a venture between the Kiribati government and the Overseas Telecommunications Commission International of Australia, it was quickly privatised. In 2001 the government of Kiribati signed a Joint venture agreement with TSKL, once again giving the government full ownership.

== Telephonics ==
Currently ATHKL operates a mobile telephone network as well as traditional services. ATHKL has installed 28 pay phones not only on Tarawa but also on some outer islands. Phone cards are the only payment option for such calls. The company has started a yellow pages directory to list the ever growing citizens with telephone numbers. International Direct Dial is a service which allows the caller to have a direct call to international telephone users. A High Frequency Radio Telephone makes communication between islands possible. In 2005 the radio telephone was replaced with a more modern traditional telephone connection on five outer islands. The user is charged per-minute and IDD is only available for some three hours per day. In the event that the police department, fire department or an ambulance are needed, 992, 993 and 994, respectively, are to be telephoned.

The mobile telephone system originally used analog technology but in 2005 this was switched to a GSM variant. Also as part of this upgrade GSM phone service is now available on Kiritimati, Abaiang, Marakei, Maiana, Tab. North, Onotoa. UMTS(3G)/LTE(4G) services is available in Tarawa (launched 29/10/2013) and is also available in Kiritimati. The GSM network is currently being decommissioned in favor of the UMTS service which offers data and voice services. International SMS is also available on the UMTS network (Note: International SMS is NOT available with the GSM service).

== Coconut Wireless ==
ATHKL's ISP, Coconut Wireless, utilizes a satellite uplink and wireless modem system in unison with equipment from NextNet Wireless, which is now owned by AT&T. Billing and integration is handled by SSI Micro. Service is available in South Tarawa and five other islands, as TSKL mandates that service be available to all of the outer islands. A second satellite has since been installed to handle more users and speed.

Because of its location, Internet in Kiribati is much more expensive than in other regions. 500MB can be downloaded for A$30 a month at a burst speed of 128kbit/s. Once the 500 MB is exceeded, speed will be reduced to that of dial up. Three additional tiers exist each with more speed, included usage, and of course cost. A modem needs to be purchased or rented. TSKL sells modems for $399 for an indoor modem, and $759 for an out of doors version. A modem may also be rented for $25 a month.
