= C Spire =

Telecommunication company in the U.S.

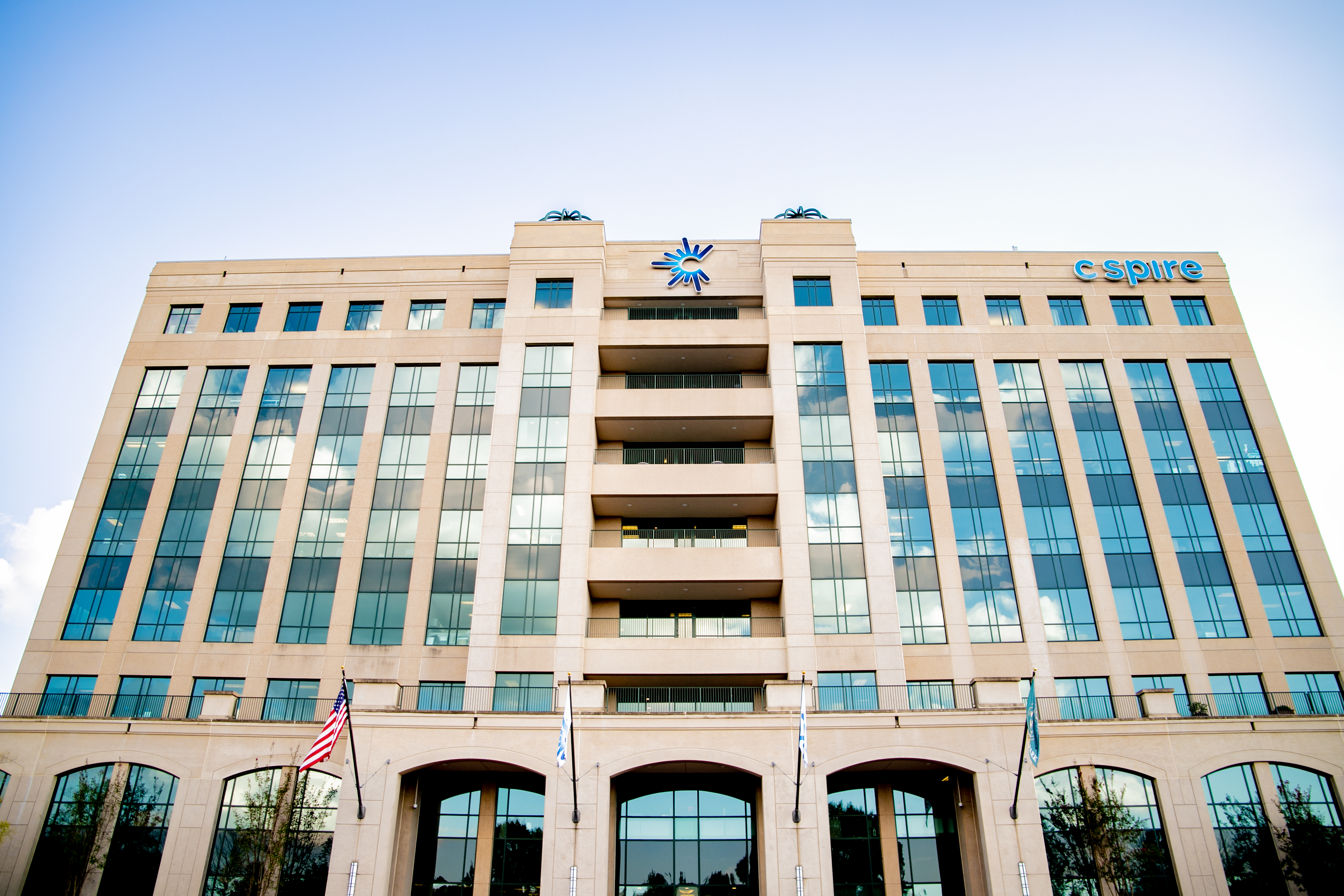
- C Spire's corporate headquarters in Ridgeland, Mississippi
- Trade name: C Spire
- Company type: Subsidiary
- Industry: Telecommunications
- Founded: 1988; 38 years ago
- Founder: Wade H. Creekmore Jr. and James H. "Jimmy" Creekmore Sr.
- Headquarters: Ridgeland, Mississippi, U.S.
- Number of locations: 72 stores, 2 call centers, 4 data centers, 6 sales offices
- Area served: Wireless: Mississippi and parts of Alabama and Tennessee; Home fiber: Mississippi, Alabama and Tennessee; Business: nationwide in the U.S.
- Key people: Suzy Hays (president and CEO)
- Products: Wireless voice and data, fiber to the home, cloud services, managed IT services
- Parent: Telapex, Inc.
- Website: cspire.com

C Spire, formerly known as Cellular South, Inc., is an American privately owned telecommunications and technology company headquartered in Ridgeland, Mississippi. The company consists of three business divisions – Wireless, Home Fiber, and Business.

C Spire owns and has access to low, mid and high-band wireless spectrum in its primary service areas. The division offers 5G and 4G LTE mobile services and has been offering wireless services since 1988. C Spire provides service in Mississippi, the Memphis Metropolitan Area, and parts of Alabama including Mobile and Baldwin County. C Spire sells devices as well as prepaid and postpaid plans.

C Spire Home Fiber, began Gigabit speed Fiber to the Home efforts in 2013, providing gigabit and multi-gigabit residential fiber internet access for consumers in Mississippi, Alabama and Tennessee. C Spire operates over 20,000 route miles of buried fiber optic cable.

C Spire is owned by the holding company Telapex, Inc., which also owns Telepak Networks, Inc., and several smaller Mississippi and Alabama telecoms.

== Growth and recognition ==
The company's wireless division announced on September 22, 2011, that it planned on rebranding from Cellular South to C Spire Wireless to be put into effect on September 26 of that year. In 2013, C Spire announced it was purchasing Mobile, Alabama based Callis Communications, a provider of unified cloud services for businesses. In 2014, the company activated Mississippi's first residential 1 Gbps Fiber to the Home customer in Quitman, Mississippi.

In 2018, the company purchased Teklinks, based in Birmingham, Alabama, to expand their footprint in the commercial and enterprise business, as well as their geographical footprint in the southeast.

In Oct. 2019, C Spire launched C Spire Health, a mobile app to provide health care for people in Mississippi, especially those in rural and under served areas, with minor ailments.

C Spire announced a partnership with Alabama Power on December 5, 2019, to bring Gigabit speed (1000 Mbit/s) internet services to the Birmingham area, as well as Shelby County and other parts of Alabama, in 2020. C Spire became a member of the Alabama Rural Broadband Coalition (ARBC), which is focused on rural broadband expansion. As part of the ARBC, C Spire helped expand rural broadband access to Jasper, Alabama, in 2020.

In January 2021, the company announced it would be investing US$1 billion over three years to deploy broadband internet to serve more than 200,000 homes and businesses in Mississippi and Alabama and support the expansion of 5G access.

In July 2021, C Spire completed the acquisition of Harbor Communications. With this acquisition, the company is providing fiber-based broadband internet access and related services to several cities and towns in Mobile and Baldwin counties on Alabama's Gulf Coast.

In October 2021, C Spire announced it will acquire Alabama-based telecommunications provider Troy Cablevision in a deal subject to regulatory approval. Troy Cablevision was founded in 1985 and offers cable, internet and other services to businesses and residents in Pike, Coffee, Crenshaw and Dale counties. It has offices in Troy, Elba, Enterprise, Luverne and Ozark. The Troy Cable brand was changed to C Spire in 2022.

== History ==
Cellular South, Inc. began its wireless service on the Mississippi Gulf Coast on February 4, 1988, using AMPS technology.

In 2013, C Spire created Vu Digital, LLC as a wholly owned subsidiary.
