= List of telecommunications companies in the Americas =

A telecommunications company (historically known as a telephone company) is a company which provides broadband and/or telephony services.

The telecommunications companies of the Americas are listed below:

== Argentina ==
=== Fixed-line operators ===
- Claro (América Móvil)
- Movistar (Telefónica)
- Personal (Telecom Argentina)

=== Mobile operators ===
- Claro (América Móvil)
- Movistar (Telefónica)
- Personal (Telecom Argentina)

== Aruba ==
=== Fixed-line operators ===
- SetarNV

=== Mobile operators ===
- Digicel (Digicel Group)
- SetarNV

== Bahamas ==
=== Fixed-line operators ===
- Liberty Latin America as BTC

=== Mobile operators ===
- BTC
- aliv

== Barbados ==
=== Fixed-line operators ===
- Liberty Latin America as LIME (Cable & Wireless Communications)

=== Mobile operators ===
- Digicel (Barbados) Limited (Digicel Group)
- Ozone Wireless
- WiNET

== Belize ==
=== Fixed-line operators ===
- Belize Telemedia
- Speednet Communications Limited

=== Mobile operators ===
- Belize Telemedia
- Speednet Communications Limited
- IBASIS
- C&W NETWORKS

== Bolivia ==
=== Fixed-line operators ===
==== National operators ====
- Entel (ENTEL S.A.) (private, over 97% shares owned by Ministry of Public Works, Services and Housing)
- AXS (AXS Bolivia S.A.) (Santa Cruz de la Sierra, La Paz and Cochabamba only)

==== Regional cooperatives ====
- COTEL R.L. (La Paz Department)
- COMTECO R.L. (Cochabamba Department)
- COTAS R.L. (Santa Cruz Department)
- COTES R.L. (Chuquisaca Department)
- COTAP R.L. (Potosí Department)
- COTEOR R.L. (Oruro Department)
- COSETT R.L. (Tarija Department)
- COTEAUTRI R.L. (Beni Department)
- COTECO R.L. (Pando Department)
- COTERI R.L. (Riberalta)
- COTEGUA R.L. (Guayaramerín)
- COTABE R.L. (Bermejo)
- COTEVI R.L. (Villazón)
- COTEMO R.L. (Santa Ana de Yacuma)
- COSEU R.L. (Uyuni)

=== Mobile operators ===
- Entel (ENTEL S.A.)
- Viva (Empresa de Telecomunicaciones Nuevatel PCS de Bolivia S.A.) (Balesia and COMTECO)
- Tigo Bolivia (TELECEL S.A.) (Millicom)

== Brazil ==
=== Fixed-line operators ===
- Claro (América Móvil)
- TIM (Telecom Italia)
- Vivo (Telefónica)
- Algar Telecom
- Sercomtel

=== Mobile operators ===
- Claro (América Móvil)
- TIM (Telecom Italia)
- Vivo (Telefónica)
- Algar Telecom
- Sercomtel

== Canada ==
=== Fixed-line operators ===
- Allstream
- Bell Canada
  - Bell Aliant
  - Manitoba Telecom Services
- Eastlink
- Northwestel
- Provincial Tel
- Rogers Telecom (Rogers Communications)
- SaskTel
- Telus
- Sogetel

=== Mobile operators ===
- Bell Mobility (Bell Canada)
  - MTS Mobility (Manitoba Telecom Services)
  - DMTS Mobility
  - Télébec Mobilité
  - Virgin Plus Canada (Formerly Virgin Mobile)
  - Lucky Mobile
- ICE Wireless
- Rogers Wireless (Rogers Communications)
  - Fido Solutions (Rogers Communications)
  - Mobilicity
  - Chatr
- SaskTel Mobility (SaskTel)
- Vidéotron Mobilité (Québecor)
  - Freedom Mobile (Québecor)
  - Fizz Mobile (Québecor)
- Telus Mobility (Telus)
  - Koodo Mobile
  - Public Mobile

== Chile ==
=== Fixed-line operators ===
- Claro HFC (América Móvil)
- CMET
- Entelphone (Entel)
- Gtd Manquehue (GTD)
- Gtd Telesat (GTD)
- Rural Telecommunications Chile S.A. (RTC)
- Telefónica (formerly CTC)
- Telefónica del Sur (GTD)
- VTR (Liberty Global)

=== Mobile operators ===
- Claro (América Móvil)
- Entel PCS (Entel)
- Movistar (Telefónica)
- Virgin
- WOM

== Colombia ==
=== Fixed-line operators ===
- Azteca
- Emcali
- ETB
- Telefónica Telecom
- UNE EPM (formerly EPM – Empresas Públicas de Medellín)

=== Mobile operators ===
- Claro Colombia (América Móvil)
- Movistar (Telefónica)
- Tigo Colombia (Millicom, ETB, EPM)
- Wom (Partners Telecom Colombia S.A.S.)
- Virgin Mobile (via Movistar network)
- Móvil éxito (Grupo Éxito) (via Tigo network)
- ETB (via Tigo network)

== Costa Rica ==
=== Fixed-line operators ===
- Grupo ICE
- RACSA-ICE (Grupo ICE)
- VoCex (R&H Telecom)
- Tigo (Millicom)
- Liberty (Liberty Latin America)
- Telecable
- CoopeGuanacaste

=== Mobile operators ===
- Claro (América Móvil)
- kölbi (Grupo ICE)
- Liberty (Liberty Latin America)
- Tuyo (MVNO ICE Network)
- Full Móvil (MVNO Racsa, ICE Network)

== Cuba ==
=== Fixed-line operators ===
- ETECSA

=== Mobile operators ===
- CUBACEL

== Curaçao ==
=== Fixed-line operators ===
- UTS Curaçao

=== Mobile operators ===
- Digicel (Digicel Group)
- UTS Curaçao

== Dominican Republic ==
=== Fixed-line operators ===
- Claro Codetel (América Móvil)
- Altice Dominicana
- Viva

=== Mobile operators ===
- Viva
- Claro Codetel (América Móvil)
- Altice Dominicana
- Orange (Orange)

== Ecuador ==
=== Fixed-line operators ===
- CNT EP

=== Mobile operators ===
- Claro (América Móvil)
- CNT EP
- Movistar (Telefónica)
- Tuenti (Telefónica)

== El Salvador ==
=== Fixed-line operators ===
- Telefónica

=== Mobile operators ===
- Claro (América Móvil)
- Digicel (Digicel Group)
- Movistar (Telefónica)
- Red Telecom (Infonet)
- Tigo El Salvador (Millicom)
- Telecom El Savador

== French Guiana ==
=== Fixed-line operators ===
- Telesur

=== Mobile operators ===
- Digicel (Digicel Group)

== Grenada ==
=== Fixed-line operators ===
- Liberty Latin America as LIME

=== Mobile operators ===
- Digicel (Digicel Group)
- LIME

== Guadeloupe ==
=== Fixed-line operators ===
- Outremer Telecom

=== Mobile operators ===
- Digicel (Digicel Group)

== Guatemala ==
=== Fixed-line operators ===
- A-Tel (America Telephone)
- Americatel Guatemala (Entel (Chile))
- AT&T Guatemala (AT&T Inc.)
- Cablenet SA
- Empresa Guatemalteca de Telecomunicaciones (GUATEL) (state-owned)
- Telecomunicaciones de Guatemala (América Móvil)
- Telecomunique Guatemala (Telecomunique)
- Claro (América Móvil)

=== Mobile operators ===
- Claro (América Móvil)
- Digicel (Digicel Group)
- Tigo Guatemala (Millicom)

== Guyana ==
=== Fixed-line operators ===
- Guyana Telephone and Telegraph Company

=== Mobile operators ===
- Digicel (Digicel Group)
- Guyana Telephone and Telegraph Company

== Haiti ==
=== Fixed-line operators ===
- Natcom S.A (formerly Teleco S.A)

=== Mobile operators ===
- Comcel Haiti (acquired by Digicel Group in April 2012)
- Digicel (Digicel Group)
- My Haiti Mobile (My Haiti Mobile)

== Honduras ==
=== Fixed-line operators ===
- Hondutel

=== Mobile operators ===
- Claro (América Móvil)
- Digicel (Digicel Group)
- Honducel (Hondutel)
- Tigo Honduras (Millicom)

== Jamaica ==
=== Fixed-line operators ===
- FLOW, newly merged entity combining the old Flow and LIME; owned by Cable & Wireless Communications, a Liberty Latin America company
- Digicel Play, a new fibre to the home network owned by Digicel Group

=== Wireless broadband operators ===
- DEKAL Wireless, a municipal Wi-Fi network owned by Cable & Wireless Communications and operated by FLOW Jamaica
- Caricel, a new Jamaican owned startup, soon to offer fixed and mobile broadband via an LTE-A network
- Digicel, through their WiMAX network (which is currently being upgraded to TDD-LTE)

=== Mobile operators ===
- Digicel (Digicel Group)
- FLOW (owned by Cable & Wireless Communications, a Liberty Latin America company)

== Martinique ==
=== Fixed-line operators ===
- Orange (Orange S.A.)

=== Mobile operators ===
- Digicel (Digicel Group)

== Mexico ==
=== Fixed-line operators ===
- Axtel/Alestra/Megacable (Grupo Alfa)
- Izzi Telecom (Grupo Televisa)
- Telmex (América Móvil)
- Totalplay (Grupo Salinas)

=== Mobile operators ===
- AT&T Mexico (AT&T)
- Movistar (Telefónica)
- Telcel (América Móvil)

== Nicaragua ==
=== Mobile operators ===
- Claro (América Móvil)
- TIGO
- NICATEL
- TELCOR
- Megacom
- JM Nicaragua

== Panama ==
=== Fixed-line operators ===
- Cable & Wireless Panama (CWC)

=== Mobile operators ===
- Cable & Wireless Móvil (CWC)
- Tigo Panama (Millicom)
- Digicel Panama (Digicel)
- Claro Panama (América Móvil)
- Trans Ocean Network
- C&W Communications
- Lanet Telecom

== Paraguay ==
=== Fixed-line operators ===
- Copaco

=== Mobile operators ===
- Tigo Paraguay (Millicom)
- Personal (Telecom Italia)
- Claro (América Móvil)

== Peru ==
=== Fixed-line operators ===
- Telefónica
- Claro (Telmex)
- AC Telecom
- Dolphin Telecom
- Turris Telecom
- Telecom Peru
- Fravatel Peru

=== Mobile operators ===
- Movistar (Telefónica)
- Claro (América Móvil)
- Bitel (Viettel Peru)
- Entel Perú (Entel Chile)
- Caribbean Communication Network
- ADN Network
- Force Telecom
- AV Telecom
- Newtel Telecom Peru
- GK Telecom

== Puerto Rico and the United States Virgin Islands ==
=== Fixed-line operators ===
- Puerto Rico Telephone (PRT-Claro) (América Movil)
- Liberty Puerto Rico (Liberty Latin America)
- San Juan Cable/Liberty Cablevision Puerto Rico (Liberty Cablevision of Puerto Rico – before: OneLink Communications, Inc.) (uses VOIP)
- Liberty Cablevision Puerto Rico (uses VOIP)
- Choice Cable TV (uses VOIP)

=== Mobile operators ===
- Centennial Wireless (Centennial Communications)
- Claro Puerto Rico (mobile phone network) (América Móvil)
- Liberty Puerto Rico (Liberty Latin America)
- T-Mobile (Deutsche Telekom)
- TracFone Wireless (América Móvil)
- Open Mobile Puerto Rico

== Saint Kitts and Nevis ==
=== Fixed-line operators ===
- LIME

=== Mobile operators ===
- LIME
- Digicel (Digicel Group)
- EDA
- The Cable
- CIN

== Saint Lucia ==
=== Fixed-line operators ===
- Cable & Wireless/LIME
- Karib Cable

=== Mobile operators ===
- Digicel (Digicel Group)

== Saint Vincent and the Grenadines ==
=== Fixed-line operators ===
- LIME

=== Mobile operators ===
- Digicel (Digicel Group)
- NTRC

== Suriname ==
=== Fixed-line operators ===
- Telesur

=== Mobile operators ===
- Airtel
- Digicel (Digicel Group)

== Trinidad and Tobago ==
=== Fixed-line operators ===
- bmobile
- FLOW
- Digicel

=== Mobile operators ===
- Digicel (Digicel Group)
- bmobile (TSTT & Cable & Wireless)
- BICS

== United States ==
=== Fixed-line operators (over $10 billion annual revenues) ===
- AT&T
- Charter Communications
- Comcast
- Cox Communications
- Lumen Technologies
- Verizon (acquired XO Communications)

=== Fixed-line operators ($1 to $10 billion annual revenues) ===
- Altice (Cablevision, Lightpath, and Suddenlink Communications)
- Cable One Sparklight
- Cincinnati Bell (acquired Hawaiian Telcom)
- Consolidated Communications (acquired FairPoint Communications)
- Crown Castle International Corp. (acquiring Lightower)
- Frontier Communications
- Granite Telecommunications
- GTT Communications (Acquiring Interoute)
- IDT Corporation
- Mediacom
- Telephone and Data Systems (includes subsidiaries TDS Telecom and formerly U.S. Cellular)
- Windstream Communications (acquired EarthLink)
- Zayo Group
- WideOpenWest

=== Fixed line operators ($100 million to $1 billion annual revenues) ===
- ACN Inc.
- Alaska Communications
- Birch Communications & Cbeyond
- Cogent Communications
- GCI
- Lumos Networks
- Pac-West Telecomm
- Primus Telecom

=== Fixed line operators (less than $100 million annual revenues) ===
- PMC Telecom

=== Mobile operators ===
- AT&T Mobility
- Dish Wireless
- T-Mobile
- Verizon

== Uruguay ==
=== Fixed-line operators ===
- ANTEL

=== Mobile operators ===
- Ancel (Antel)
- Claro (América Móvil)
- Movistar (Telefónica)

== Venezuela ==
=== Fixed-line operators ===
- CANTV

=== Mobile operators ===
- Digitel
- Movilnet (CANTV)
- Movistar (Telefónica)

== See also ==
- Telecommunications company
- List of telecommunications companies
  - List of telecommunications companies in Asia and Oceania
  - List of telecommunications companies in Europe
  - List of telecommunications companies in the Middle East and Africa
- List of mobile network operators
  - List of mobile network operators of the Americas
  - List of mobile network operators in Asia and Oceania
  - List of mobile network operators in Europe
  - List of mobile network operators in the Middle East and Africa
