= Telecommunications in Jamaica =

Telecommunications in Jamaica include radio, television, fixed and mobile telephony, and Internet services. The sector is regulated by the Office of Utilities Regulation (OUR) and the Spectrum Management Authority (SMA) under the Ministry of Science, Energy and Technology (MSET).

Jamaica’s telecom market is one of the most advanced in the Caribbean, with near-universal mobile coverage and growing broadband access. Liberalization in the early 2000s led to rapid expansion in mobile services, driven by Digicel Jamaica and Flow Jamaica (formerly LIME/Cable & Wireless).

== History ==
Before liberalization, the market was dominated by Cable & Wireless Jamaica which provided fixed-line and international services, until new entrants were allowed in the early 2000s.

In 2001, the government opened the telecom market to competition, issuing mobile licenses to Digicel and Oceanic Digital (MiPhone). By 2004, overall teledensity surpassed 100 per 100 inhabitants (driven by explosive mobile growth), placing Jamaica among the leaders in the Caribbean at that time.

MiPhone (Oceanic Digital) was acquired by América Móvil in 2007 and rebranded as Claro Jamaica. In 2011-2012 the Government approved and Digicel completed the acquisition of Claro Jamaica, consolidating the market into two main operators (Digicel and Flow/Cable & Wireless).

In the 2010s, both companies expanded 3G and LTE networks. Digicel launched LTE service in June 2016, followed by Flow which progressed its LTE rollout during 2016-2017 after spectrum applications and initial site activations.

From 2021 onward, the regulator initiated consultations and spectrum processes to prepare for next-generation services (including 5G). Public statements and industry events in 2022-2024 discussed trials and readiness, though widescale commercial deployment remained limited.

== Telecommunications ==
Jamaica is a member of the North American Numbering Plan (NANP). The NANP Administrator (NANPA) has allocated the area codes 876 and 658 for use in the country, which is a single numbering plan area (NPA) with an overlay numbering plan. The national telephone number format is NPA-NXX-XXXX, where N is one of the digits 2 through 9, and X is any digit.

For international dialing to Jamaica, the country code is 1.

For accessing international destinations from within Jamaica, the international call prefix is 011.

Calls from Jamaica to other NANP nations, such as the U.S. and Canada, are dialed as 1 + NANP area code + 7-digit number.

Jamaica has a fully digital telephone communication system.

- Main lines: 265,000 lines in use, 123rd in the world (2011).
- Mobile cellular: 2.7 million, 135th in the world (2012).
- Telephone system: Fully automatic domestic telephone network; the 1999 agreement to open the market for telecommunications services resulted in rapid growth in mobile-cellular telephone usage while the number of fixed-lines in use declined (2011).
- Teledensity: 110 per 100 persons (combined) (2011).
- Satellite earth stations: 2 Intelsat (Atlantic Ocean) (2010).
- Communication cables: Fibralink submarine cable links to the Americas Region Caribbean Ring System (ARCOS-1) submarine cable in the Dominican Republic and on to the US, parts of the Caribbean, Central and South America; the ALBA-1 fiber-optic submarine cable links Jamaica, Cuba, and Venezuela (2010).

=== Mobile telephony ===
The country's three mobile operators – Cable and Wireless (once marketed as LIME – Landline, Internet, Mobile and Entertainment now named FLOW), Digicel, and at one point Oceanic Digital (operating as MiPhone and now known as Claro since late 2008) until the carrier was acquired and the relevant spectrum sold to Digicel – have spent millions in network upgrade and expansion. Both Digicel and Oceanic Digital were granted licences in 2001 to operate mobile services in the newly liberalised telecom market that had once been the sole domain of the incumbent Cable and Wireless monopoly. Digicel opted for the more widely used GSM wireless system, while Oceanic opted for the CDMA standard. Cable and Wireless, which had begun with TDMA standard, subsequently upgraded to GSM, and currently utilises both standards on its network.

With wireless usage increasing, landlines supplied by Cable and Wireless have declined from just over half a million to roughly three hundred thousand as of 2006. In a bid to grab more market share, Cable and Wireless recently launched a new land line service called HomeFone Prepaid that would allow customers to pay for minutes they use rather than pay a set monthly fee for service, much like prepaid wireless service.

Two more licenses were auctioned by the Jamaican government to provide mobile services on the island, including one that was previously owned by AT&T Wireless but never utilized, and one new license.

Another entrant to the Jamaican communications market, FLOW, laid a new submarine cable connecting Jamaica to the United States. This new cable increases the total number of submarine cables connecting Jamaica internationally to four. The company's parent was acquired by Cable and Wireless Communications in November 2014 and finalized in March 2015. The new FLOW was re-launched as a successor to LIME and the old Flow on August 31, 2015; offering mobile, fixed voice, fixed broadband and TV services to the market. It has now become the first quad-play provider in Jamaica. The company runs a vast copper network (inherited from LIME) islandwide as well as a Hybrid Fiber and Coaxial network (from the old Flow) in the metropolitan areas of Kingston and Montego Bay. They also have small Fiber-to-the-home operations in certain sections of St. James that began in 2011 (under LIME). On the mobile side, the company had completed its 4G HSPA+ rollout (capable of speeds up to 21 Mbit/s) across the island in November 2015 and has announced plans to move to LTE within the year 2016. However, Digicel has become the first LTE network operator in Jamaica, going live with their network on June 9, 2016.

== Radio and television ==
- Radio stations: Privately owned Radio Jamaica Limited and its subsidiaries operate multiple radio stations; there are roughly 70 other privately owned radio stations (2007).
- Radios: 1.215 million (1997).
- Television stations: Privately owned Radio Jamaica Limited and its subsidiaries operate multiple TV stations as well as subscription cable services; there are 2 other privately owned television stations (2007).
- Television sets: 460,000 (1997).

== Internet ==
- Internet top-level domain: .jm, registration of .jm domains is handled by MITS at the University of the West Indies, registration is free, although there has been some discussion about MITS making the service commercial in the coming years.
- Internet users: 1.3 million users, 108th in the world; 46.5% of the population, 94th in the world (2012).
- Fixed broadband: 125,188 subscriptions, 96th in the world; 4.3% of population, 109th in the world (2012).
- Wireless broadband: 45,505 subscriptions, 127th in the world; 1.6% of the population, 128th in the world (2012).
- Internet hosts: 3,906 hosts, 149th in the world (2012).
- IPv4: 202,752 addresses allocated, less than 0.05% of the world total, 70.1 addresses per 1000 people (2012).

=== Internet censorship and surveillance ===
There are no government restrictions on access to the Internet or credible reports that the government monitors e-mail or Internet chat rooms without judicial oversight.

The law provides for freedom of speech and press, and the government generally respects these rights in practice. An independent press, generally effective judicial protection, and a functioning democratic political system combine to ensure freedom of speech and press. The independent media are active and express a wide variety of views without restriction. Broadcast media were largely state owned, but open to pluralistic points of view. Although the constitution prohibits arbitrary interference with privacy, family, home, or correspondence, in practice the police conduct searches without warrants.

A law decriminalizing defamation was passed by the Jamaican House of Representatives in November 2013 after being approved unanimously by the Senate the previous July. It took six years to amend the libel and slander laws, which – although little used – made media offences punishable by imprisonment.

== Trends and future development ==
- 5G readiness and pilots – Regulators and operators have been preparing for next-generation (5G) services, with spectrum consultations and tenders (incl. 600 MHz) and public statements about testing/pilots. Widescale commercial rollout remains limited.
- Rural broadband – The Universal Service Fund (USF) continues to expand community Wi-Fi hotspots and Community Access Points (CAPs), devices for schools, and other inclusion programs across underserved parishes.
- Digital TV migration – Jamaica is migrating to ATSC 3.0 (NextGen TV). TVJ began ATSC 3.0 transmissions in early 2022 and expanded coverage through 2024, with national switchover guided by the Broadcast Commission/BCJ.
- Smart Jamaica / smart-city initiatives – Government and utilities have pursued smart-city pilots (e.g., New Kingston) and broader "Smart Jamaica" agenda involving IoT and data-driven services, supported by international partners.
- Cybersecurity framework – Jamaica’s cybersecurity posture is anchored by the National Cyber Security Strategy (2015) and has been strengthened by sectoral measures and the full enforcement of the Data Protection Act in December 2023. Authorities continue to advance national cyber resilience through 2024-2025 initiatives.

== See also ==
- Area codes in the Caribbean
- Jamaica Broadcasting Corporation, former public broadcaster of Jamaica.
- Television Jamaica, commercial television station.
