= Sunbeach =

Sunbeach Communications Inc. is an Internet service provider and mobile/wireless phone company located in Barbados. Since the mid-1990s, Sunbeach is one of the main competitors to the incumbent telecommunications company Cable and Wireless in providing Internet services. Sunbeach was badly affected by the 2008 financial crisis leading to halted VC investments and the link disconnection on 23 March 2013 . The Sunbeach website remains in a temporary state and offers no new products or further information. Customers found themselves without Internet and no official communication from the company on the morning of 24 March 2013. No statement has been received from the company since the disconnection until date (Q2-2016).

== History ==
Founded by Bruce Bayley, Damian Dunphy and Leonardo Kunar in November 1995 as an Internet service provider (ISP) in Barbados to compete against Caribsurf (the brand name used by Cable and Wireless for Internet service provision in the Caribbean) and CaribNet, the first ISP launched in the Eastern Caribbean by Ian Worrell which grew out of the bulletin board system (BBS)"The Junction BBS". In May 1997 Christopher Alleyne and Thomas Clarke joined Damian Dunphy as owner managers of Sunbeach. Soon thereafter Sunbeach acquired the customer base of Caribnet (the first ISP in Barbados) and Ian Worrell, Caribnet's founder joined the Sunbeach management team. Sunbeach grew to become the largest ISP in Barbados by mid-2001. In January, 2002 it was made public that Sunbeach and the UK based Telecommunications Company called International Telecom Brokers Limited (ITB) were contemplating and formulating a strategy to merge. The purported advantages of the merger was that Sunbeach in Barbados could draw from the experience of the UK team and have a far more expanded international reach. The merged company would be based in Barbados, with a subsidiary operating from the United Kingdom. The benefits to be derived were, a lower cost of product to the consumer, an increase of products especially in e-commerce and emerging m-commerce, and the ability to make Barbados far more competitive with other business locations such as the Cayman Islands and Bermuda. Leading up to the Sunbeach and ITB Ltd. merger problems started to surface. Personnel at the companies tried to allay fears and promise that the merger will create an increase of jobs, lead the company on an international path, as well as joint listings on the Alternative Investment Market (AIM) of the London and Barbados Stock Exchange (BSE) and also that new investors from the United Kingdom would help raise needed funding for establishing a local 3G GSM mobile phone network. The merger never did take place but Sunbeach went on to achieve the stock exchange listings in Barbados and London in August 2002. Sunbeach went on to bid for one of the mobile phone licenses in Barbados and in August 2003 was awarded one of three new licenses issued by the Barbados Government. Other winners of licenses were Digicel and AT&T.

In July 2004, the future of Sunbeach was called into question, an audit of the company by Deloitte & Touche cited that the company's future hinged on establishing more capital to secure a future for the company.

Following this, on 28 September 2004 Sunbeach Communications had its shares suspended on the Barbados Stock Exchange because of the serious financial position of the company until the Annual General Meeting could be held with shareholders. Following the suspension of shares on the BSE, the Board of Sunbeach voluntarily asked the Alternative Investment Market (AIM) on the London Stock Exchange to suspend shares there as well. This led to Sunbeach becoming delisted from the AIM in April, 2005.

In June, 2005 Sunbeach announced that Telecom Holdings Limited, (TH) of Trinidad and Tobago wished to acquire a significant stake into Sunbeach Communications Inc and the board of Directors urged shareholder to agree to a sale of partial ownership. This never happened, see the section on Laqtel below.

In October 2005 the Managing Director - Michael Wakley - stepped down and Ian Worrell took over the running of the company. Talks with Laqtel collapsed and Mr. Worrell initiated talks with VTel Holdings a company registered in Dubai.

In November 2006 the suspension on Sunbeach's shares were lifted - see the Barbados Stock Exchange website for information and a block trade announced bringing a new major shareholder and partner on board (VTel Holdings). This new partner was to provide the funding needed to allow Sunbeach to launch its Cellular network and provide the re-capitalization needed allowing the company to move forward, however no progress has been seen to date. The new partner is VTel Holdings (Dubai) and to date they have been propping up the company's cash flow position while working to establish a new business plan to take the business forward.

At the last AGM held 17 July 2008, the Managing Director Ian Worrell and an executive director, Banan al Khatib, announced that a plan was being finalized and would be announced at the next AGM to be held in 3 to 6 months from 8 July.

In February 2009 a new board was elected to Sunbeach and Mr. Banan al Khatib took over as the managing director, replacing Mr. Ian Worrell who stayed on as the Chief Commercial Officer. In April 2009 a contract was signed with Huawei for the build of a GSM network in Barbados.

Between April 2009 and April 2010, the Great Recession and ongoing dissension in VTel prevented Sunbeach from moving forward with its plans. Consultants hired by VTel were brought in to advise the VTel Board on whether to roll out the network or mothball the company, and their overwhelming advice was to roll the network. This advice was not taken, and in April 2010 VTel decided not to fund the rollout of the cellular network.

== Internet ==
Sunbeach Communications' Internet services go by the name Sunbeach. According to the promotions by the company, Sunbeach claims they are the largest Internet provider in Barbados. The company provides services to both residential and commercial clientele with services that include: dial-up Internet, ADSL, Software downloads, Leased Line, Frame Relay, ISDN, webhosting, and Co-location services. The company also hosts a Tucows software webserver at (tucows.sunbeach.net)

== Webhosting ==
Sunbeach has offered Webhosting practically from its genesis. Past clients include the CWeek, Daily NationNews and Advocate newspapers, the Government of Barbados and several organisations around the island.

== Mobile ==
To date, Sunbeach has not launched a mobile network. However, there are rumors circulating that the new partner will be injecting equity into the company. This equity could be used to launch a mobile network.

== Laqtel ==
On 6 September 2005 an article by the Barbados DailyNation, first made public the intentions of an attempt by Telecom Holdings Limited, (TH) of Trinidad to purchase Sunbeach Communications Inc. Telecom Holdings Limited as a holdings company of LaqTel Communications, made an offering of US$2.59M, to obtain majority shareholding of the Barbados-based Sunbeach Communications.

As part of the deal, Sunbeach was to remain a mostly Barbadian company, many of the board of directors were promised to remain Barbadian and Sunbeach Communications would continue to be traded on the Barbados Stock Exchange with its over 700 shareholders. Shares of Sunbeach were suspended on the BSE in September, 2004 when they last traded for about $0.55 per share.

Once launched, Sunbeach through LaqTel would be the only CDMA and 3G wireless / mobile provider operating in Barbados. Sunbeach's competition in Barbados includes both Digicel and Cable and Wireless. Since the deal was first announced, AT&T Wireless had changed its name to Cingular and had subsequently exited the Caribbean market, Cingular had then turned existing customers over to Digicel.

To date Laqtel have been unable to raise their financing. They split from their equity partner, SasTel in February 2006 and have been searching for a new partner since then. Their current CEO - Dr. Joseph Laquis, a general practitioner and ex politician is heading the company and Mr. Richard Nixon - ex sales executive from Nortel is their COO.

== See also ==
- Laqtel
