= Bmobile =

Mobile phone provider in Trinidad and Tobago

bmobile
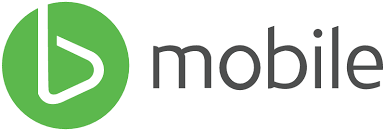
- Industry: Wireless telecommunications
- Founded: 1991
- Headquarters: Port-of-Spain, Trinidad and Tobago
- Area served: Trinidad and Tobago
- Products: Mobile telephony, Fixed Line, ISP, IPTV, Home Security
- Number of employees: 2,300 (TSTT employees)
- Parent: TSTT
- Website: bmobile.co.tt

bmobile is a Mobile Phone, Home Security provider, and fixed wireless provider of Trinidad and Tobago, operating as a division of TSTT.

== History ==
TSTT has re-branded its mobile division to bmobile along with other Cable & Wireless companies in the Caribbean. Since then, almost all the other Caribbean mobile divisions have been re-branded to LIME and now FLOW.

In 1991, they launched their AMPS network. This network was decommissioned on September 8, 2006. In 2002, bmobile launched its GSM network.

In 2007, they began launching data services (fixed wireless) on a CDMA2000 EVDO network. This was later upgraded to WiMAX and then to LTE. The network operates on LTE band 41 (2.5 GHz)

On June 14, 2011, they began to sell the Apple iPhone 3GS and iPhone 4.

In March 2014, the company announced 3G UMTS offering HSPA+ data services to all customers.

Part of its 5-year strategy, bmobile refreshed its brand and announced a launch of HD Voice over its 3G network as well as improved speeds by upgrading its existing HSPA+ network to support DC-HSPA+. Days later, on December 9, 2016, the company went live with its LTE network which, at the time of launch, was only available in Port of Spain, San Fernando, and soon after, a few locations in Tobago on LTE Band 2 (1900 MHz). Service was launched on LTE Band 28 (700 MHz) in October 2020 alongside the introduction of LTE-A. The company began broadcasting on LTE Band 4 (1700 MHz) in late 2022 and later launched 3 carrier-aggregation and 4x4 MIMO. 256 QAM is also active on the network. Voice over LTE services (VoLTE) were launched on January 29, 2025.

In order for bmobile to do an LTE rollout however, the company decommissioned its 2G GSM 1900 MHz network.

bmobile's parent company also purchased Massy Communications, now branded as AMPLIA, a move which saw the company increase its market share against the Caribbean-heavyweights, FLOW and Digicel. AMPLIA offers TV and fiber broadband services and also resells bmobile's landline and home security services.

bmobile Logo until December 2016

== Radio frequency summary ==
bmobile operates GSM, UMTS and LTE mobile networks and a Fixed Wireless LTE network in all of Trinidad and Tobago. The company launched a limitedly available FWB NR network in December 2018.

The following is a list of known frequencies that bmobile employs in Trinidad and Tobago:

Frequencies used on the bmobile Network
Frequency range	Band number	Protocol	Class	Bandwidth (MHz)	Status	Notes
850 MHz CLR	5	GSM/GPRS/EDGE	2G	2.5	Active/Phasing-Out	Currently being retained for 2G customers
1900 MHz PCS	2	UMTS/HSPA/HSPA+/DC-HSPA+	3G	5	Active	Fallback for Calls and HSPA+ data
850 MHz CLR	5	UMTS/HSPA/HSPA+/DC-HSPA+	3G	5	Active	Fallback for Calls and HSPA+ data
1900 MHz PCS	2	LTE/LTE-A	4G	15	Active / Being deployed	Re-farmed 10 MHz from Decommissioning GSM 1900 network across the country as well as 5 MHz from UMTS band 2.
1700 MHz AWS	4	LTE/LTE-A	4G	15	Active / Being deployed	Used for additional capacity and for LTE-A
700 MHz APT	28	LTE/LTE-A	4G	10	Active / Being deployed	Used for indoor coverage and for LTE-A
2500 MHz BRS	41	LTE/LTE-A	4G	20+20+10	Active / Being deployed	Fixed Wireless Broadband
2500 MHz BRS	n41	NR	5G	50?	Active / Being deployed	Fixed Wireless Broadband

== See also ==
- Telecommunications Services of Trinidad and Tobago
- List of mobile network operators of the Americas
- List of telecommunications regulatory bodies
