= Telecommunications in the British Virgin Islands =

Country Code: +1284
International Call Prefix: 011 (outside NANP)

Calls from the British Virgin Islands to the US, Canada, and other NANP Caribbean nations, are dialled as 1 + NANP area code + 7-digit number. Calls from the British Virgin Islands to non-NANP countries are dialled as 011 + country code + phone number with local area code.

Number Format: nxx-xxxx

Telephones – main lines in use: 11,700 (2002)

Telephones – mobile cellular: 8,000 (2002)

Telephone system: worldwide telephone service
general assessment: worldwide telephone service
domestic: NA
international: Connected via submarine cable to Bermuda; the East Caribbean Fibre System (ECFS) submarine cable provides connectivity to 13 other islands in the eastern Caribbean (2007)

Radio stations: AM 1, FM 5, shortwave 0 (2004)

- ZBVI 780 Tortola
- ZJKC-FM 90.9 Tortola (repeats WJKC 95.1 Christiansted, USVI)
- ZGLD-FM 91.7 Tortola
- ZCCR-FM 94.1 Todman's Peak
- ZWVE-FM 97.3 Tortola
- ZKNG-FM 100.9 Chalwell
- ZROD-FM 103.7 Tortola
- ZVCR-FM 106.9 Chalwell

Television stations: 1 (ZBTV), (plus one cable company) (1997)

Internet service providers (ISPs): 1 (1999)

Internet country code: VG

Internet hosts: 465 (2008)

Internet users: 4,000 (2002)

See also : British Virgin Islands

== Deregulation of the telephone market ==
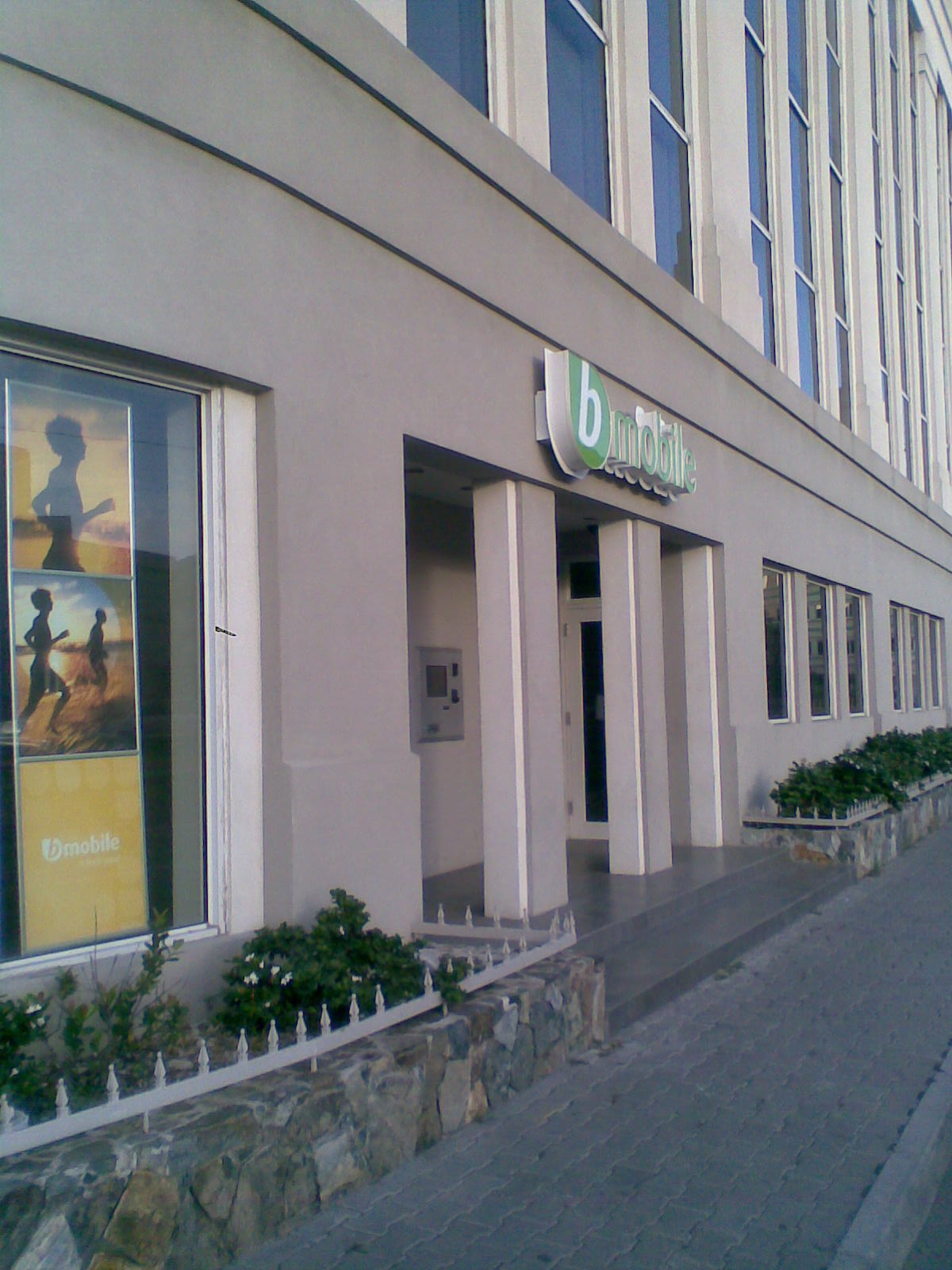
bmobile's headquarters in the BVI.

In 2006, the British Virgin Islands government undertook a deregulation of the telephone industry. Prior to 2006, in common with many other Caribbean countries, Cable & Wireless (Caribbean) had a statutory monopoly on telephone and other electronic communications services. However, in the 1990s, a local company called CCT Boatphone, which had previously provided radio boatphones to tourists on charter boats, expanded into cellular (mobile) telecommunications for land-based users. Although technically in breach of the statutory monopoly, CCT Boatphone was backed by a powerful collection of local interests known as the BVI Investment Club. Negotiations between Cable & Wireless and CCT Boatphone led to a split of the monopolies, with Cable & Wireless retaining a monopoly over fixed line and internet services, and CCT Boatphone keeping a de facto monopoly over cellular telephones.

In 2007 the government abolished the previously existing monopolies under an order made pursuant to the new legislation. The process proved politically fraught, and the government's Minister for Communications and Works, Alvin Christopher, ended up leaving the government and joining the opposition party as a result of the furore. The process was also criticised as cumbersome and slow, the initial deregulation having been announced in 2004, and taking no less than three years to come to fruition through delays in legislation and regulation.

Although there have been no new entrants into the fixed line industry, the government issued three licences under the new regime to cellular telephone service providers. The existing provider, CCT Boatphone, obtained one licence. Bmobile, the cellular arm of Cable & Wireless, obtained a second. The third licence was obtained by BVI Cable TV, a local cable television service. The licence in favour of BVI Cable was controversial, as the Regulator had announced in advance that only three licences in total would be issued, and BVI Cable TV had crumbling cable television infrastructure, and was in no position to offer cellular telephone services (and to date, has not offered any cellular telephone services, or anything other than simple cable television). However, bmobile's main regional competitor, Digicel, was rejected for a licence. The decision was regarded as highly controversial in the local media.

Digicel then issued court proceedings against the Regulator, arguing that he had acted improperly by imposing an arbitrary limit of three licences (although no complaint was made about the decision to prefer BVI Cable TV's improbable licence over Digicel). Bmobile was joined to the suit as an interested party. High Court Judge Rita Joseph-Olivetti found in favour of Digicel and quashed the original decision. Digicel commenced separate proceedings against Cable and Wireless (as bmobile's parent company) in the English courts, claiming that Cable & Wireless has unfairly stifled competition in several Caribbean jurisdictions. During the intervening period, bmobile has obtained a virtual stranglehold on the cellular telecommunications market in the British Virgin Islands by a combination of low prices and aggressive advertising, as well as significant investment in infrastructure and technology.

Digicel was finally granted a licence on 17 December 2007 and started operations in the BVI on 28 November 2008.
