= Laqtel =

- Company type: Private
- Industry: Telecommunications
- Headquarters: Trinidad and Tobago

LaqTel Ltd. ("LaqTel Communications") was a privately held up-start mobile phone and wireless service provider, of Trinidad and Tobago. A division of Telcom Holdings Ltd. (TH), LaqTel was first founded in 2002 by Joseph Laquis, the current CEO of LaqTel Communications is Michael Barrow.

== History ==
Laqtel was initially financially backed by a group of local investors who were awarded one of the first mobile licenses- by the Telecommunications Authority of Trinidad and Tobago (TATT) on July 5, 2005. The licenses awarded to Laqtel and one other bidder formally began the process of mobile competition in Trinidad and Tobago alongside the incumbent Telecommunications monopoly provider TSTT.

Laqtel Communications was successful in its submitted bid along with Digicel. The two companies were chosen to form the initial process of competition in the wireless landscape of Trinidad and Tobago. NatTel, Cingular Wireless and Telkom Caribe were the other providers that were unsuccessful in the licensing round. The LaqTel logo was designed by Kenrick Rampial, who won a nationwide design competition in October 2005.

Prior to the TATT announcement of which companies received licenses, both Digicel and Cingular Wireless had announced a deal where Digicel will acquire from Cingular their entire Caribbean and Bermuda-based wireless networks and licenses, thus leaving only Laqtel and Digicel as new entrants for Trinidad and Tobago.

On March 14, 2008 had its CDMA licence revoked in Trinidad and Tobago due to its failure to pay outstanding bonds and court fines. Equipment valued at $1 million TTD was also seized from its offices.

== See also ==
- Sunbeach
