= Telecommunications Services of Trinidad and Tobago =

Telephone and internet service provider in Trinidad and Tobago

Telecommunications Services of Trinidad and Tobago Limited
- Type: Government-owned and controlled corporation
- Industry: Telecommunications, Internet broadband, Wireless Services, Security and Vigilance
- Founded: 1991
- Headquarters: 1 Edward Street, Independence Square South, Port of Spain, Trinidad and Tobago
- Key people: Keino Cox (CEO) (acting)
- Operating income: $2.88 billion (2017)
- Owner: Government of Trinidad and Tobago (51%), Cable & Wireless Communications (49%)
- Subsidiaries: AMPLIA Communications bmobile
- ASN: 5639
- Website: www.tstt.co.tt

Telecommunications Services of Trinidad and Tobago Limited (generally known as TSTT) is an incumbent telephone and Internet service provider in Trinidad and Tobago. The company, which is jointly owned by National Enterprises Ltd (NEL) 51%, a majority-owned company of the Government of Trinidad and Tobago, and Cable & Wireless Communications 49%, was formed out of a merger of Telco (Trinidad and Tobago Telephone Company Limited) and Textel (Trinidad and Tobago External Telecommunications Company Limited). TSTT no longer holds a monopoly in fixed-line telephone services due to FLOW introducing a fixed-line service of their own, and their cellular monopoly was broken in June 2005 when licenses were granted to Digicel and Laqtel. The current chief executive officer is Keino Cox (acting), with Lauren Sandiford as Corporate Secretary (acting), and Kern Dass as chairman

== History - TELCO ==
The first telephone was introduced in Trinidad and Tobago in 1883 and the first telephone exchange was located adjacent to the Town Hall (now City Hall) on Frederick Street. By 1898, the telephone system had developed sufficiently to justify enactment of the Telephone Communication Ordinance.

Around 1890, the telephone service extended westward out of Port of Spain to Carenage and then onwards to one customer in Chaguaramas. In the early 1900s, the government operated telephone lines in rural areas, namely from Arima to Manzanilla and from San Fernando to Cedros. History records show that a Mr. Bell of Bacolet started the service in Tobago.

The early system consisted of local battery operated telephones connected to a magneto switchboard, a far cry from the sophisticated electronic system which is in operation today. Special cables called enamel cables were developed for use in this country, and it is reported that their use became worldwide because of their durability.

The British-owned Trinidad Consolidated Telephones Limited was responsible for the early developmental growth of the telephone network in Trinidad and Tobago from the mid-1930s until 1960.

Approximately 6,300 lines were in service when the country got its first 1000-line step-by-step exchange in 1936. In 1947, Consolidated purchased the government-operated system in Tobago and the first teleprinter (TELEX) link was established in 1949.

After a prolonged strike in 1960, which existed for 1,124 days, the government of the day purchased the company, and on November 30, Trinidad Consolidated Telephones Limited became the state owned Trinidad and Tobago Telephone Service.

In 1968, the Government entered into a partnership with Continental Telephone of the United States, to whom it sold fifty percent of the holdings. This was later dissolved in 1973 and the company returned to full ownership by the Government.

Over the years, automatic step-by-step exchanges were gradually extended to suburban and urban areas as the company sought to keep pace with the development of the country. Development programmes were implemented in 1935, 1943, 1952 and 1964. A loan agreement was signed in 1974 with the World Bank for 18 million dollars to carry out a massive development programme. This resulted in the introduction of modern, electronic stored programme equipment at the exchanges.

In 1979, the government contracted Nippon Electric of Japan for the supply and installation of 48,000 additional lines and associated equipment.

In March 1981, some 8,000 subscribers were transferred to the new electronic exchange at Nelson. Similar ND 20 exchanges were commissioned at Thompson in San Fernando, Chaguanas, Couva, Piarco, San Juan, Diego Martin, Maraval, Arouca and St Augustine.

The major thrust of the company's development programme took place during the period 1982 to 1987.

Between 1983 and 1989, DMS-100 digital switches were installed throughout the country and, as a result of this new technology, training of employees became a significant factor. The new technology saw the introduction of new services such as international direct distance dialing and vertical services (call waiting, call forwarding and conference calling).

The company's operations were divided into the following divisions - Technical Operations, Marketing, Human Resources and Finance. The company's employee headcount was 2,300 (including contractors).

There were approximately 160,000 customers in four major operating districts.

== TEXTEL ==
The Trinidad and Tobago External Telecommunications Company Limited (TEXTEL), was incorporated as a limited liability company in December 1969 a joint venture participation, with the Government of Trinidad and Tobago holding 51% of the share capital and Cable and Wireless (West Indies) Limited, the other 49%.

The company acquired the assets of Cable and Wireless in Trinidad and Tobago and assumed responsibility for external telecommunications, commencing 1 January 1970. As the legally constituted body charged with the responsibility for telecommunication links between the country and the rest of the world, TEXTEL provided the transmission, switching and signalling facilities to interconnect with the international facilities of all other countries.

== Enterprise services ==
=== Mobile services ===
bmobile Logo until December 2016

TSTT has re-branded its mobile division to bmobile along with other Cable and Wireless companies in the region. TSTT's mobile service currently uses the GSM network for data and voice. In 2007 they began launching data services on a CDMA network. Their previous TDMA network was discontinued on August 31, 2006.

As of 2006 competition has been introduced into its mobile market in Trinidad and Tobago. Digicel, which also serves other countries in the Caribbean, began operations on their GSM network in early 2006. Digicel and TSTT have since had legal battles over an inter-connection agreement to allow communication between their two networks. LAQTEL, a Trinidadian owned company, was also awarded a CDMA license but on March 14, 2008, had its license revoked.

=== Internet services ===
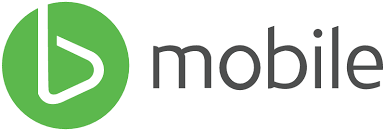
Blink Bmobile is now bmobile

TSTT Internet Services include dial up service, wireless broadband service based on EVDO technology, and ADSL-based Broadband service. It's also the most expensive per Mbp/s in the country. TSTT also offers a variety of data solutions for the corporate sector including leased circuits, virtual private networks, frame relay services, and metro Ethernet service with speeds up to 1 GB. In October 2007, TSTT introduced its ADSL2+ broadband internet service branded "Blink Broadband" with speeds up to 10 Mbit/s. However lagging behind their competitor, Columbus Communications, they still have a large portion of the market secured due to their previous copper network. Yet, to outdated technology and packages on their copper and fiber networks many people have flocked to the competitor. If these errors are not corrected, they are sure to fail. They have since sought refuge in the ever-expanding technology of LTE. Yet, they are making the same mistakes as before, throttling download and upload speeds next to nothing Mbit/s. This has gained them the upper hand in accessing markets blocked by topographical features. Many rural settlements have since been the main targets to obtain revenue. The service in question, has not lived up to expectations, which is mainly due poor performance attributed to the over-saturation of users and lack of available bandwidth.

The new packages include up to a maximum of 40Mbp/s download and 4Mbp/s upload only on their fiber network limited to certain areas. Their LTE network supports up to 5Mbp/s download and 1Mbp/s upload.

After launching a co-branded service in 2008, it was announced in the media in 2015 that TSTT was discontinuing its tstt.net.tt email addresses due to a termination of service with G-mail.

==== IP Address Block Allocation ====
The following IPv4 and IPv6 address blocks has been assigned to TSTT by the Latin America and Caribbean Network Information Centre:

IPv4 Blocks	Unique addresses	Starting IP	Ending IP
186.44/15	131,072	186.44.0.0	186.45.255.255
190.58/16	65,536	190.58.0.0	190.58.255.255
190.59/16	65,536	190.59.0.0	190.59.255.255
196.3.132/22	1,024	196.3.132.0	196.2.135.255
196.3.136/21	2,048	196.3.136.0	196.3.143.255
196.3.144/22	1,024	196.3.144.0	196.3.147.255
200.108.0/20	4,096	200.108.0.0	200.108.15.255
200.108.16/20	4,096	200.108.16.0	200.108.31.255
201.238.64/18	16,384	201.238.64.0	201.238.127.255
209.94.192/19	8,192	209.94.192.0	209.94.223.255
Total IPv4	299,008		

IPv6 Blocks	Unique addresses	Starting IP	Ending IP
2800:420::/30	2^{98}	2800:420:0:0:0:0:0:0	2800:423:255:255:255:255:255:255
Total IPv6	~3.17×10^{29}		

=== Television services ===
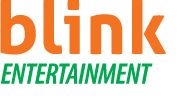
Retired Blink Entertainment brand logo

TSTT has rolled out its new TV service also branded as "bmobile" which is based on the IPTV technology. The company has rolled out a wireless version of this service based on GSM technology although they are no longer offering this product and is offering customers the option to sign up for Amplia TV instead.

=== Security services ===
TSTT has entered the electronic surveillance market as well by launching their "Blink Vigilance" (now bsecure) service with an optional armed response add-on.

== Affiliation and memberships ==
- Caribbean Association of National Telecommunications Organizations (CANTO) – affiliate
- Caribbean Network Operators Group (CaribNOG)
- Caribbean Telecommunications Union (CTU) Private Sector/Non-State Members - bMobile
- Communications Worker's Union (CWU) Employees
- Global System for Mobile Communications (GSMA)
- Trinidad and Tobago Chamber of Industry and Commerce – Member

== See also ==
- Communications in Trinidad and Tobago
- Telecommunications Authority of Trinidad and Tobago
- List of mobile network operators of the Americas
- List of largest companies by revenue
- List of public corporations by market capitalization
- List of telecommunications regulatory bodies
- List of telephone operating companies

== External website ==
- Official website
