= Edward Wilshaw =

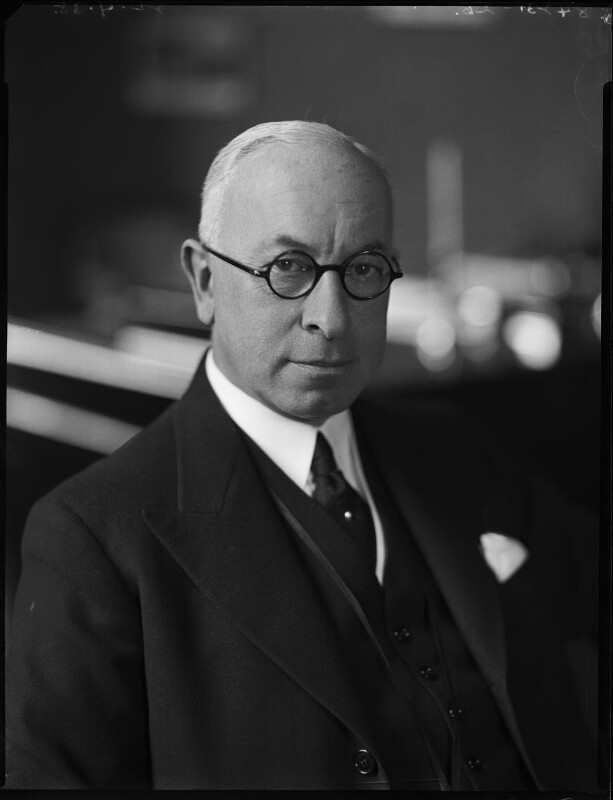
Wilshaw in 1938

Sir Edward Wilshaw (3 June 1879 – 3 March 1968) was a British businessman, the chairman of Cable & Wireless Communications from 1936 to 1947.

== Career ==
Wilshaw began his career as an Eastern Telegraph Company apprentice in 1894. He became Chairman of the company in 1936 and was knighted in 1939. During World War II, Wilshaw employed his friend John Logie Baird to work on developing high-speed facsimile transmission. After the war, the new Labour government of Clement Attlee nationalised the company in 1947, and Sir Edward became president of the new company. He later wrote a memoir of his career in the telecommunications industry.

== Family ==
Wilshaw was born in 1879 in Liverpool and died at his London home on 3 March 1968, aged 88. He married Myn Moar in 1912, and they had two daughters.

In 1944, his daughter Anne married Flying Officer C.R. Driver, DFM, an RAF officer who had earlier gained fame, in 1939, as one of the first Allied airmen to be decorated in the Second World War. Ronnie Driver is now also known for being the father of actress Minnie Driver, through his mistress Gaynor Millington.

== CS Edward Wilshaw ==
In 1949, Swan, Hunter and Wigham Richardson Ltd. built a 313 feet (95 m)/2,522 long tons (2,562 t) cable ship named the CS Edward Wilshaw, the largest cable repair ship when launched in the C&W fleet. Completed at a cost of £300,000 and with a cable capacity of 18,850 square feet (1,751 m^{2}), she was based in: Mombasa during the 1950s; Gibraltar from 1965-70; and the Pacific Ocean from Madang, Papua New Guinea from 1970 to 1979, the year in which she was scrapped at Vigo Spain.
