= Alegro PCS =

Ecuadorian telecommunications company

Alegro
- Company type: Mobile phones
- Genre: Telecommunications
- Headquarters: Quito, Ecuador
- Area served: Ecuador
- Parent: Corporacion Nacional de Telecomunicaciones
- Website: CNT Mobile

Alegro or Telecsa S. A. was an Ecuadorian mobile phone and telecommunications company. The company was based in Quito and was under the ownership of Ecuador's fixed telephone operator Corporacion Nacional de Telecomunicaciones (CNT EP).

Telecsa S.A. (Alegro) was created by Andinatel and Pacifictel S.A. to provide mobile phone service in Ecuador. The company obtained a fifteen-year advanced mobile service license in April 2003 and in December 2003 began operation in the country under its brand name Alegro PCS.

In March 2010 it was announced that Alegro will be totally absorbed by the Corporacion Nacional de Telecomunicaciones (CNT EP), thus becoming property of the Ecuadorian government.

Alegro currently no longer exists, and is now known as CNT Mobile (Part of the Corporacion Nacional de Telecomunicaciones (CNT EP)).
