= Columbus Communications =

- Type: Subsidiary
- Industry: Television, Landline services, Internet service provider, B2B, B2G
- Founded: 2004
- Headquarters: Barbados
- Key people: Brendan Paddick, CEO
- Divisions: Karib Cable (Antigua and Barbuda)
- Website: www.columbuscommunications.com

Columbus Communications was a cable television, telephone, and broadband speed Internet service provider. Operating as a regional media company, Columbus is currently financially based in Barbados and provides services in Grenada, Jamaica, Trinidad and Tobago, Curaçao, Antigua and Barbuda, Saint Lucia, and Saint Vincent and the Grenadines.

The company's operations in Antigua and Barbuda were previously branded as Karib Cable. But it as well as its operations in other countries are now under the Flow branding. The company formerly held a 71% share in Cable Bahamas, before divesting of that holding in 2010.

== History ==
Columbus entered the Curaçao retail market in January 2010 through the acquisition of Curaçao Cable TV NV, a fledgling start up that held video and internet concessions, but had yet to reach the commercial stage.

By the fall of 2010, a new fully digital video head end was constructed, providing Flow customers access to more than 250 video and audio channels – by far the most comprehensive television service in Curaçao. In addition, Flow offers residential broadband internet packages ranging from an entry-level service of 5 Mbit/s up to 100 Mbit/s. In partnership with its sister company, Columbus Business Solutions, they also provide a range of corporate data services including data storage, disaster recovery, IP services, hosting and business continuity services.

The company was then officially acquired by Cable & Wireless Communications, the parent company of another fellow telecommunications company in the Caribbean, named LIME. The cost of the acquisition was US$1.85 Billion dollars.

The company then became a fully owned entity of CWC. FLOW became the consumer-facing brand for the new company across all of CWC's former LIME. It offers quad-play services (i.e. mobile, fixed voice, fixed home broadband and television).

== Management & Executive Team ==
- Chairman and chief executive officer, Brendan Paddick
- President and COO, Paul W. Scott
- Chief Financial Officer, Maxwell Parsons, C.A.

== See also ==
- ARCOS-1
- CFX (cable system)
- Fibralink (cable system)
