= Vodafone Automotive =

Vodafone Automotive S.p.A.
- Company type: Division
- Industry: Automotive
- Founded: 1975 (as Delta Elettronica s.a.s. di Dall'Osto Isidoro & C.); 2004 (as Cobra Automotive Technologies); 2015 (as Vodafone Automotive)
- Founders: Romeo Roman, Serafino Memmola, Isidoro Dall'Osto, Maria Pagliara
- Headquarters: Varese, Italy
- Key people: Gion Baker (CEO), Mario Rossetti (Chairman)
- Products: Anti-theft vehicle; Assistance Systems maneuvers; Services for the recovery of stolen vehicles; Wireless Communication Systems; Management services for corporate fleets; Multimedia products for Camper
- Revenue: ▼€110.2 million
- Operating income: ▲€4 million
- Net income: ▼€156.6 million
- Number of employees: ▼832
- Parent: Vodafone Global Enterprise
- Subsidiaries: Cobra Do Brasil Serviços De Telematica São Paulo (Brazil); Vodafone Automotive Telematics Development Valbonne (France); Vodafone Automotive France Chaville (France); Vodafone Automotive Japan Yokohama (Japan); Vodafone Automotive Italia Busto Arsizio (Italy); Vodafone Automotive Italia Roma (Italy); Vodafone Automotive UK Burnley (United Kingdom); Vodafone Automotive Telematics Mendrisio (Switzerland); Vodafone Automotive KoreaYongin-si (South Korea); Cobra (Beijing) Automotive Technologies Beijing (China); Vodafone Automotive Deutschland Kandel (Germany); Vodafone Automotive Espana Madrid (Spain)
- Website: automotive.vodafone.com

Vodafone Automotive SpA, based in Varese, Italy, offers automotive telematics and electronics through two business units. The company was originally listed on the Milan Stock Exchange on 12 December 2006. Originally named "Cobra Automotive Technologies SpA", it was acquired by Vodafone PLC in August 2014 for €145 million ($191 million) which was equivalent to Cobra's FY13 revenue, and delisted from the Milan Stock Exchange. On 1 April 2015 it changed name to its current form.

The operations of Vodafone Automotive are delivered through two business units: Vodafone Automotive Telematics Services, dedicated to developing infrastructure and telematics services, and Vodafone Automotive Electronic Systems, focused on the design, development, production and distribution systems and electronic components. Vodafone Automotive Telematics SA, previously 80% owned by Vodafone Automotive and 20% by Tracker Connect Proprietary Limited, has direct operations in Brazil, Italy, France, Germany, Spain, Switzerland and the United Kingdom. In Malaysia, Russia and South Africa Cobra has strong relationships with leading regional players. Vodafone Automotive Electronic Systems has direct operations in Italy, China, Japan and South Korea.

== History ==
The company was founded in 1975 under the name "Delta Electronics & C. sas Dall'Osto Isidoro" by Romeo Roman, Serafino Memmola and Isidoro Dall'Osto, and began operations. One of the first products in Italy, in anti-theft vehicle devices, was named Cobra by Serafino Memmola, which gave the company its name.

Over the years it underwent several transformations and name changes:

- In 1976 it was transformed into a general partnership;
- In 1982 it was transformed into a limited liability company;
- In 1985 it was transformed into a joint stock company, keeping the name Delta Elettronica SpA;
- In 2004, it was renamed Cobra Automotive Technologies SpA, following the incorporation of the company Cobra Italy srl, formerly known as Proco Italia srlì, which was founded in 1995.
- In 2007, Cobra made three acquisitions in France, Italy and the UK, creating new direct branches and start the project for the construction of the regional headquarters for Asia in China.
- In 2008, Cobra opened an office in São Paulo, Brazil, dedicated to developing telematics.
- In 2015, Vodafone Automotive became the new trading name for Cobra Automotive Technologies.

Currently the group's activity is divided into three areas:

- the design and manufacture of electronic systems for cars and motorcycles vehicles, in particular anti-theft systems and health care systems in low-speed maneuvers;
- design and management of geolocation services;
- marginal, as part of the group, is the activity of the German subsidiary Cobra Deutschland Gmbh, which also distributes multimedia products to be installed on RV.

On June 16, 2014, Vodafone Group PLC announced it had agreed to buy Cobra Automotive Technologies SpA for €145 million as part of its Machine to Machine (M2M) strategy to connect and better manage physical devices, also known as the "Internet of Things" (IOT).

On August 7, 2014 Vodafone confirmed that its voluntary tender offer (the “Offer”) for security and telematics provider Cobra Automotive Technologies S.p.A. (“Cobra”) had become wholly unconditional. The Offer settled on 8 August 2014. The total consideration for the entire issued share capital of Cobra was €145 million (£115 million / US$191 million).

Vodafone purchased more than 95% of Cobra's share capital through the Offer and then started proceedings to purchase the remaining shares. Cobra became a wholly owned subsidiary of Vodafone and was de-listed from the Italian Stock Exchange (Borsa Italiana). The purchase of remaining shares and de-listing of Cobra were expected to occur on 14 August 2014. As of August 28, 2014 Cobra Automotive Technologies appears to no longer be listed on the Milan Stock Exchange.

From 1 April, Vodafone Automotive is the new trading name for Cobra Automotive Technologies.

== Owner ==
- Vodafone Global Enterprise Ltd. - 100%

== Significant investments ==
- Cobra Telematics S.A. - Mendrisio (Switzerland) - 80%
- Cobra Telematics Development S.A.S. - Valbonne (France) - 80%
- Cobra do Brasil Serviços de Telematica Ltda - São Paulo (Brazil) - 56%
- Cobra Italy S.p.A. - Busto Arsizio (Italy) - 80%
- Cobra UK Ltd. - Sale, Greater Manchester (United Kingdom) - 80%
- Cobra France S.A.S. - Chaville (France) - 40.75%
- Cobra Automotive Technologies Korea Ltd. - Yongin -Si (South Korea) - 100%
- Cobra (Beijing) Automotive Technologies Co., Ltd. - Beijing (China) - 100%
- Cobra Japan K.K. - Tokyo (Japan) - 100%
- Cobra Deutschland GmbH - Kandel (Germany) - 80%
- Cobra FM S.àr.l - Chaville (France) - 100%
- Cobra Electronic Systems S.r.l. - Varese (Italy) - 100%
- Cobra Telematics Car Services Espana S.L. - Madrid (Spain) - 80%
- Help Company S.r.l. - Milan (Italy) - 70%

The company also indirectly controls the company :

- Nexo CJSC - (Russia) - 24% (by Cobra Telematics SA)
- Wunelli Ltd. - (United Kingdom) - 22.7% (by Cobra Telematics SA)
