= ULTRACOM =

Telecommunications corporation

ULTRACOM — or Telecomunicaciones Ultramarinas de Puerto Rico (TUPR) in Spanish— is a telecommunications corporation that manages satellite and submarine communications cable systems connected to Puerto Rico. It is jointly owned by PREPA.Net and Telefónica S.A. The corporation was formed in 1992 after the government of Puerto Rico privatized the Puerto Rico Telephone Company and needed to split its assets in order to comply with anti-monopolistic laws.

In February 2008, PREPA.Net acquired Puerto Rico Telephone's share in ULTRACOM for an undisclosed amount.

ULTRACOM manages earth stations, a fiber optic cable station, and a digital microwave station from which it provides domestic and international services to long distance carriers and foreign administrations. The corporation currently manages the landing points in Puerto Rico of the undersea cable systems of AMERICAS-I, AMERICAS-II, ANTILLAS I, and ARCOS-1.
