= .jm =

Internet country code top-level domain for Jamaica

- Introduced: 24 September 1991
- TLD type: Country code top-level domain
- Status: Active
- Registry: University of the West Indies
- Sponsor: University of the West Indies
- Intended use: Entities connected with Jamaica
- Actual use: Gets some use in Jamaica
- Registration restrictions: None in com.jm, net.jm, or org.jm; various restrictions in other subdomains
- Structure: Registrations are at third level beneath second level labels
- Registry website: mona.uwi.edu/mits/

.jm is the Internet country code top-level domain (ccTLD) for Jamaica. Registrations are at the third level beneath the second level names com.jm, net.jm, org.jm, edu.jm, gov.jm, and mil.jm. Registrations are processed by hand rather than automatically, so registrants are asked to allow 30 days for the registrations to be completed. Updates to domain names (such as changes to nameservers) can only be authorized by the technical or registrant e-mail addresses. Registration of .jm domains is handled by Mona Information Technology Services (MITS) at the University of the West Indies. Registration is free, although there has been some discussion about MITS making the service commercial in the coming years.

== See also ==
- Internet in Jamaica
