= ANTILLAS I =

ANTILLAS I is a fiber optic submarine communications cable that extends between the Dominican Republic and Puerto Rico. It has been in service since June 1997 and is operated on a common carrier basis.

ANTILLAS I uses digital channels operating at 64 kilobits per second (kbit/s) that allow over 15,000 simultaneous calls without multiplexing. It consists of six working optical fiber pairs with each fiber pair carrying four 155 Mbit/s Basic System Modules (BSMs), with each BSM containing sixty-three Minimum Investment Units (MIUs), for a total capacity, on each fiber pair, of 252 MIUs.

== Carriers ==
- AT&T Corporation (AT&T)
- GTE Hawaiian Telephone Company Incorporated (HTC)
- IDB WorldCom Services (WorldCom)
- International Telecommunications Corporation (ITC)
- MCI International
- Pacific Gateway Exchange (PGE)
- Sprint Nextel Corporation (Sprint)
- Telecomunicaciones Ultramarinas de Puerto Rico (TUPR or ULTRACOM)
- Telefónica International Wholesale Services (TIWS)
- The St. Thomas and San Juan Telephone Company (STSJ)

== Landing points ==
ANTILLAS I cable landing points include:

- Cacique, Dominican Republic
- Isla Verde, Carolina, Puerto Rico
- Miramar, San Juan, Puerto Rico
- Punta Cana, Dominican Republic
