= ARCOS-1 =

The Americas Region Caribbean Ring System (ARCOS-1) is a fiber optic submarine communications cable of 8,400 kilometers that extends between the United States, the Bahamas, the Turks and Caicos Islands, the Dominican Republic, Puerto Rico, Curaçao, Venezuela, Colombia, Panama, Costa Rica, Nicaragua, Honduras, Guatemala, Belize, and Mexico. Because of its length, it was divided in two phases: Phase 1 being in service since September 2001 and Phase II since March 2002. The cable system was set in a ring configuration and is operated on a non-common carrier basis.

== Carriers (incomplete) ==
- Columbus Networks (Formerly- New World Network)
- Telecomunicaciones Ultramarinas de Puerto Rico (TUPR or ULTRACOM)

== Landing points ==
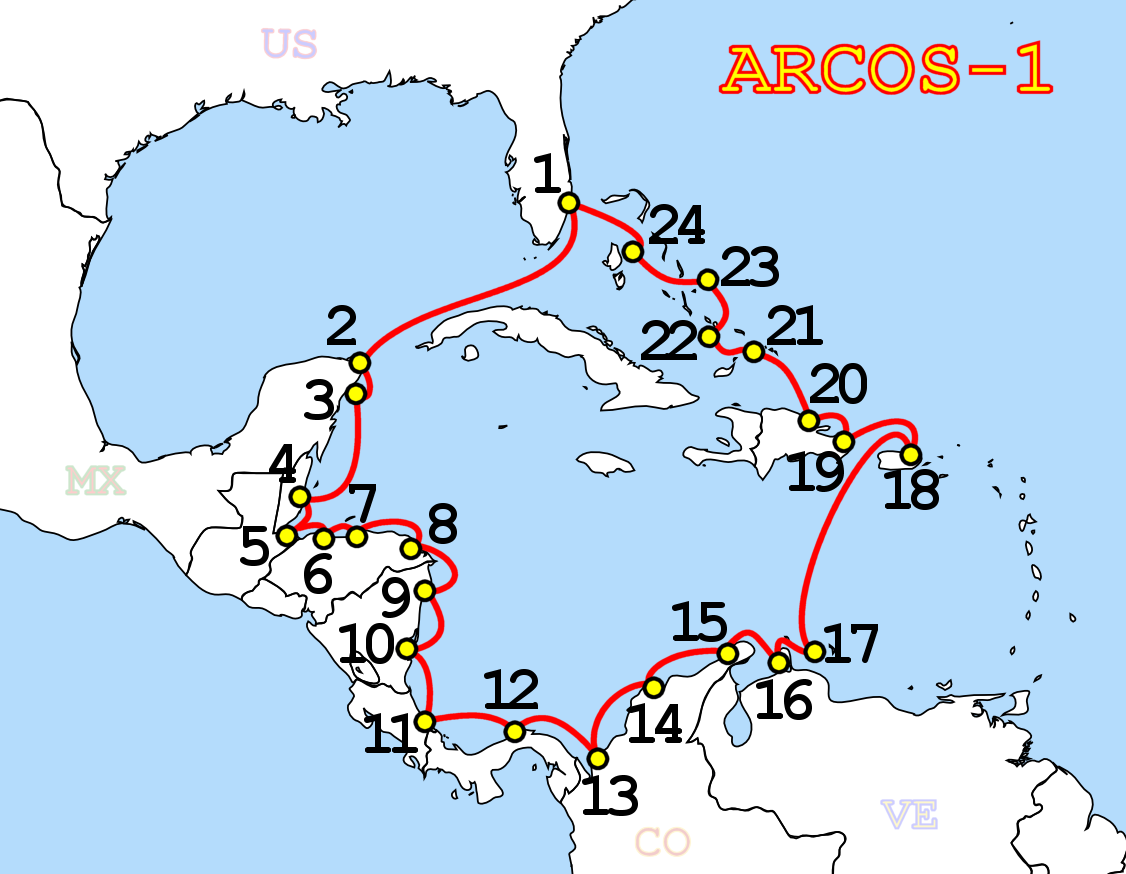
Route of the cable.

1. North Miami Beach, Florida, U.S.
2. Cancún, Mexico
3. Tulum, Mexico
4. Ladyville, Belize
5. Puerto Barrios, Guatemala
6. Puerto Cortés, Honduras
7. Trujillo, Honduras
8. Puerto Lempira, Honduras
9. Puerto Cabezas, Nicaragua
10. Bluefields, Nicaragua
11. Puerto Limón, Costa Rica
12. María Chiquita, Panama
13. Ustupo, Panama
14. Cartagena, Colombia
15. Riohacha, Colombia
16. Punto Fijo, Venezuela
17. Willemstad, Curaçao
18. San Juan, Puerto Rico
19. Punta Cana, Dominican Republic
20. Puerto Plata, Dominican Republic
21. Providenciales, Turks and Caicos Islands
22. Crooked Island, Bahamas
23. Cat Island, Bahamas
24. Nassau, Bahamas

== See also ==
- ECFS (cable system)
