= .vg =

Internet country code top-level domain for the British Virgin Islands

- Introduced: 20 February 1997
- TLD type: Country code top-level domain
- Status: Active
- Registry: nic.VG (KSregistry GmbH)
- Sponsor: Telecommunications Regulatory Commission of the Virgin Islands
- Intended use: Entities connected with the British Virgin Islands
- Actual use: Used by a number of sites, a few of which are in British Virgin Islands
- Registration restrictions: None
- Structure: Registrations are available directly at second level
- Documents: Terms & Conditions
- Dispute policies: Uniform Domain Name Dispute Resolution Policy (UDRP)
- Registry website: www.nic.vg

.vg is the Internet country code top-level domain (ccTLD) for the British Virgin Islands. Because it allows registration at the second level, and does not require the registrant to be associated with the British Virgin Islands, it has also been used by piracy related websites such as The Pirate Bay, and video gaming related blogs and websites.

== March 2013 dispute over ownership of the .vg, .tc, and .gd registries ==
In March 2013 domain name registrars such as GoDaddy stopped accepting new registrations for .vg, .gd, and .tc domain names. This is the result of a dispute over the ownership and control of AdamsNames Ltd., which had been the accredited registry by the Internet Assigned Numbers Authority (IANA) for those top level domains. A former partner of AdamsNames Ltd. created a new company, Meridian TLD, which claimed to be the new accredited registry.

On 10 April 2014, the zone was re-delegated by IANA to KSregistry. The sponsoring organisation was re-delegated to The Telecommunications Regulatory Commission of Virgin Islands (TRC). All changes that were made in the .vg zone after 8 March 2013 were lost as Meridian TLD did not cooperate by giving the zone file to KSregistry. After the re-delegation there was a one-month window where KSregistry-accredited registrars would be able to update, renew, or delete domain names from 15 April 2014, 10:00 UTC to 11 May 2014, 23:59 UTC. After 12 May 2014, 10:00 UTC, KSregistry would allow new domains to be registered.

== See also ==
- Internet in the British Virgin Islands
- Internet in the United Kingdom
- .vi –CC TLD for neighbouring United States Virgin Islands
- .uk –CC TLD for the United Kingdom
- Virgin Gorda
