= Vodafone Global Enterprise =

Information and communication technology conglomerate

Vodafone Global Enterprise Limited
- Company type: Subsidiary
- Industry: Information and communication technology
- Founded: April 2007; 19 years ago
- Headquarters: London, England, UK
- Area served: Worldwide
- Key people: Ben Elms (CEO)
- Services: IT services, IT consulting, Telecommunications services
- Revenue: £1.3 billion (2011)
- Parent: Vodafone Group
- Subsidiaries: Bluefish Communications; Vodafone Automotive
- Website: enterprise.vodafone.com

Vodafone Global Enterprise is a multinational company which provides telecommunications and information technology services to large corporations, and a wholly owned subsidiary of Vodafone Group. It is headquartered in London, England, and was established in April 2007.

== History ==
Vodafone Global Enterprise was established in April 2007 by Vodafone, to serve as a provider of IT and telecoms services to large corporate customers.

In October 2010 Vodafone Global Enterprise acquired two telecom expense management companies, paying US$6.9 million for Australia-based Quickcomm and $2.8 million for United States–based TnT Expense Management.

On 1 December 2011, Vodafone Global Enterprise acquired the Reading-based ICT consultancy company Bluefish Communications Ltd. The acquired operations will form the nucleus of a new Unified Communications and Collaboration practice within VGE, which will focus on implementing strategies in cloud computing, and strengthen its professional services offering.

On 23 April 2012, Vodafone announced an agreement to acquire Cable & Wireless Worldwide for £1.04 billion. The deal was completed on 30 July 2012. The acquisition will give Vodafone Global Enterprise access to CWW's fibre network for businesses, enabling it to take unified communications services to large enterprises in UK and globally; and expand its enterprise integration service offerings in emerging markets.

In June 2012, Vodafone Global Enterprise was granted supplier status to the US Federal Government under GSA Schedule 70, becoming the first non-US mobile provider to achieve such status. As part of the award Vodafone Global Enterprise will be listed as an approved supplier to provide mobile voice, data and M2M services to the US Government in eight European countries including the United Kingdom, Germany and Italy.

In July 2012, Vodafone Global Enterprise announced that it was conducting trials of dual persona mobile client, an emerging technology capable of enabling business customers to wholly compartmentalise their personal and business applications on a single device, and had plans to launch the service later in 2012.

== Operations ==
A map showing the countries where Vodafone Global Enterprise has operations (coloured in red)

Vodafone Global Enterprise is organised into the following geographical divisions:

- Northern Europe (headquartered in London, United Kingdom)
- Central Europe
- Southern Europe and Africa
- Middle East & Africa (Dubai, United Arab Emirates)
- Asia Pacific (headquartered in Singapore)
- Americas

== Services ==
Vodafone Global Enterprise's services include domestic and international voice and data, Machine to Machine services, mobile email, mobile broadband, managed services, mobile payment and mobile recording. It offers integrated communication strategies and solutions in cloud computing, unified communications and collaboration.

== Major customers ==
Vodafone Global Enterprise's major customers include:

- Deutsche Post – Vodafone Global Enterprise provides a fully managed Multiprotocol Label Switching network for Deutsche Post which connects around 400 sites across 67 countries, as part of a contract signed in March 2010.
- The Linde Group – Vodafone Global Enterprise provides mobile voice and data services to The Linde Group in 27 countries, as part of a four-year contract which was signed in October 2011.
- Unilever – Vodafone Global Enterprise manages devices, connectivity and managed mobile services for Unilever in 63 countries, and advises Unilever on the management of consumer devices and applications, as part of a three-year contract which was signed in December 2010.
- Volkswagen Group – Vodafone Global Enterprise provides mobile communications services for around 90,000 Volkswagen Group employees, as part of an exclusive four-year contract which was signed in July 2012.
