= Sercomtel =

Telecommunication company in Brazil

Sercomtel S.A.
- Type: Sociedade de Economia Mista
- Industry: Telecommunications
- Founded: 1965
- Headquarters: Londrina, Brazil
- Revenue: ▲R$ 148.7 million (2008)
- Operating income: ▲R$ 209 million (2008)
- Number of employees: 537 (2005)
- Website: www.sercomtel.com.br

Sercomtel (Portuguese pronunciation: [seʁkõˈtɛl]) is a local phone and internet service provider in the state of Paraná, Brazil. Its phone service ranges includes landline service, mobile and long distance, and broadband internet service. It was the only public telephone company in Brazil, until it was privatised and sold to the Bordeaux Fundo de Investimento in 2020.

== History ==
Copel Telecom bought 45% of Sercomtel in 1998. From 1998 to 2020, Sercomtel recorded 12 years with an annual net loss.

Until 2008, Sercomtel had the concession to provide service only in two municipalities (Londrina and Tamarana), even providing service in neighbouring cities.

On 29 January 2009, Sercomtel received authorization from Anatel director council to expand to the entire state of Paraná.

In 2019, the company's losses were R$22.98 million. In August 2020, it was acquired by Copel Telecom's parent holding Bordeaux Fundo de Investimento.

In March 2022, Sercomtel's parent company Copel Telecom became Ligga. Plans to merge its child companies (including Sercomtel) under the Ligga brand were hinted.

== See also ==
- List of internet service providers in Brazil
