= Flow (brand) =

American based telecommunications provider

FLOW
- Industry: Telecommunications
- Headquarters: Miami, Florida
- Areas served: Caribbean
- Products: Fibre broadband, Cable broadband, ADSL, VDSL & VDSL2 broadband, Mobile Broadband, TV, Mobile, Mobile telephony
- Owner: Liberty Latin America
- Website: www.discoverflow.co

Flow (stylized as FLOW) is an American telecommunications provider business segment and division of the Liberty Latin America in Colorado. It is used to market consumer cable television, internet, telephone, and mobile phone services provided by the subsidiary Liberty Caribbean throughout the Caribbean region. The brand was first introduced in 2015; prior to that, these services were marketed under the bmobile or LIME brand names.

== History ==
FLOW operates in the Caribbean, and Cable & Wireless Communications used to market cable television, internet, telephone, and mobile phone services. Flow also replaced the UTS brand in the Dutch and French Caribbean, following their acquisition of United Telecommunications Service (UTS).

Following the acquisition of Columbus by CWC, it was announced that the Flow brand would replace the Lime brand across the merged company, beginning in July 2015.

== Wireless ==
=== 2G ===
Regions in which Flow operates a mobile network descended from the former LIME brand. Flow uses the GSM standard for 2G which is accessible on 850 and 1900 MHz. It provides cellular data connectivity using GPRS and EDGE. All Flow markets have GSM coverage. 2G was discontinued in Jamaica on September 30, 2022 and will be discontinued in Saint Vincent and the Grenadines on September 30, 2023.

=== 3G and '4G' HSPA+ ===
On June 22, 2009, Flow launched their first 3G UMTS networks in Jamaica.

On October 6, 2011, CWC announced the launch of a '4G' HSPA+ network in the Cayman Islands and plans to launch HSPA+ networks in the Bahamas and LIME Barbados. In March 2012, LIME announced the addition of 4G technology in Jamaica. In January 2014, former Centrica chief executive, Phil Bentley took over as CEO of Cable & Wireless Communications. That same year, the company announced a US$250 million investment program nicknamed 'Project Marlin', aimed at improving CWC's mobile and fixed-line networks. The plan began with an announcement of an island wide HSPA+ network in Jamaica in March 2014.

In Jamaica, Flow's largest market, the network covers around 2.8 million people and according to the Office of Utilities Regulations (OUR).

=== 4G ===
Flow operates LTE networks in 12 markets.

==== Cayman Islands ====
'Project Marlin' also involved the launch and build out of LTE networks across several of the company's markets. CWC's Caymanian business unit (then named LIME Cayman) launched their first LTE network on December 10, 2013. The network initially launched with 100% coverage across the Cayman Islands on LTE Band 17 (700 MHz). CWC's network was followed by Digicel launching an LTE network on Band 3 (1800 MHz).

In August 2016, Flow became one of eight carriers in North America and the first Caribbean operator to have rolled out an LTE Advanced network, followed by Orange in the French West Indies and the Dominican Republic.

FLOW has VoLTE and Wi-Fi Calling active in this market.

==== Antigua and Barbuda ====
Flow also operates an LTE network in Antigua and Barbuda, which launched on November 24, 2014. On August 17, 2017, CWC announced that it had completed a Gigabit LTE network trial in Antigua and Barbuda in partnership with Ericsson. The LTE solution tested leveraged network technology such as carrier aggregation, 4x4 MIMO (Multiple Input Multiple Output), and higher-order modulation (256-QAM) that maximized data speeds for wireless broadband subscribers.

==== Turks and Caicos Islands and Anguilla ====
Flow operates an LTE network in the Turks and Caicos Islands (which runs off the assets acquired from Islandcom Wireless) and Anguilla on Band 13.

==== British Virgin Islands ====
Flow launched an LTE network in the British Virgin Islands on November 17, 2016. The network launched with LTE coverage available across all of the islands, LTE Advanced is available in Road Town, Spanish Town, Tortola, Spanish Island and Beef Island with speeds up to 100 Mbit/s.

==== Jamaica ====
The network's plans for LTE upgrades were officially announced on January 17, 2016, where the company announced in a press release that it would be rolling out an LTE network in Jamaica. The network was initially planned to be rolled out in the high traffic areas in the Kingston Metropolitan Area (consisting of the city of Kingston and its adjacent suburbs in Portmore, St. Catherine and the parish of St. Andrew) and on the North Coast in the resort city of Montego Bay and the resort town of Ocho Rios. The company was, however, countered by its competitor, Digicel Jamaica, which launched its LTE network on June 9, 2016, in Kingston and a portion of Montego Bay. In July, Flow announced that it had applied to the Spectrum Management Authority (SMA) for additional LTE spectrum to provide a 'faster service'. Flow subsequently acquired AWS-1 Blocks D and E to buttress their pre-existing Block F spectrum. In December 2016, Flow went live with an initial 12 LTE cell sites in the Kingston Metropolitan Area. According to Flow Jamaica's former Managing Director, Garfield Sinclair, the company's new parent, Liberty Global is focused on mobile data.

On August 20, 2017, the company announced that it was launching an additional 144 LTE sites covering Montego Bay, Ocho Rios and Mandeville by October 2017, making Flow the operator with the largest LTE footprint in the country. Flow also expanded coverage in the Kingston Metro Area, upgrading sites in the township of Portmore and the major town of Spanish Town, which went on-air in October 2017. This effort was a part of a near 200 LTE site rollout across the island, availing the major towns and cities in Jamaica with LTE coverage by the end of 2017, with the goal of achieving comprehensive coverage by 2018.

In January 2018, the network announced that it had deployed over 170 LTE sites across the island. Flow's rollout of LTE Advanced in Jamaica continued with intentions to extend LTE coverage to 87% of the Jamaican population by the end of 2018 with a future target of covering 95% of the population by 2020.

In January 2023, Flow rolled out Voice over LTE (VoLTE) on its network. Wi-Fi Calling was later added.

==== Barbados ====
After conducting its first test call in October 2016, Flow Barbados officially launched its LTE network on March 22, 2017. At the time of launch, the network had a total of 35 active sites dispersed over Band 2 and 5 LTE (1900 MHz and 850 MHz respectively), making this Flow's third LTE Advanced network deployment.

==== St. Lucia ====
Flow launched St. Lucia's first LTE network, with availability in the capital city, Castries, the town of Vieux Fort, home of Hewanorra International Airport to the south of the island and the old capital and tourist town of Soufrière (home to The Pitons, Soufrière Estate and Anse Chastanet) to the west.

The network is available on LTE Band 13 (700 MHz) with a maximum theoretical speed of 75 Mbit/s down and 25 Mbit/s up.

==== Saint Kitts and Nevis ====
On September 29, 2017, Flow launched Saint Kitts and Nevis' first LTE network, with availability in the capital city, Basseterre, St. Peter's and Bird Rock in St. Kitts as well as Charlestown in Nevis. The network is available on LTE Band 13 (700 MHz) with a maximum theoretical speed of 75 Mbit/s down and 25 Mbit/s up.

==== Saint Vincent and the Grenadines ====
In December 2018, Flow launched its LTE network in Saint Vincent and the Grenadines, with availability in the capital city, Kingstown, and nearby surrounding areas. The network is available on LTE Band 13 (700 MHz) with a maximum theoretical speed of 75 Mbit/s down and 25 Mbit/s up.

=== 5G ===
On June 4, 2024, FLOW launched 5G NR services in the Cayman Islands.

On October 15, 2025, FLOW launched 5G NR services in Barbados.

On June 11, 2026, FLOW launched 5G NR services in Jamaica.

==== Pre-5G ====
On July 17, 2017, Flow's parent company, Cable & Wireless Communications, in collaboration with their parent, Liberty Global, announced that they had conducted a trial of LTE-A Pro technology in Antigua & Barbuda. The company announced that upon installation, Antigua & Barbuda will become the first country in the Caribbean (and wider Latin America) to be availed of an LTE-A Pro network, capable of speeds up to 800 Mbit/s. In October 2017, the company will be testing a 5G prototype network, designed to deliver wireless data connections of around 2–5 Gbit/s. The testing and deployment is being done in collaboration with long time business partner and supplier, Ericsson.

=== Future footprint expansion ===
Flow currently operates in two markets with no wireless offerings:Trinidad and Tobago and Curaçao. Flow plans to add a mobile network to its portfolio in Trinidad and Tobago. The company applied to the governing telecoms body, Telecommunications Authority of Trinidad and Tobago (TATT), in 2014 for a mobile license. To date, however, Flow has yet to receive a license despite being named as the recipient of the license being tendered by TATT. They plan to build an LTE network as well despite incumbents, bmobile (TSTT) and Digicel, having well established mobile customer bases. Flow cites its experience in other markets, to include previously launched LTE networks in other markets in addition to newly built networks in Jamaica and Barbados as an impetus to get TATT to issue the license. Flow's parent company, Cable & Wireless Communications, is a minority shareholder in incumbent TSTT, however, services are not branded as C&W but as bmobile, CWC's former consumer brand from 2003 to 2008 (succeeded by LIME in November 2008 in all markets except Trinidad & Tobago).

Plans for a mobile network in Curaçao came to the fore when Cable & Wireless Communications acquired UTS Curaçao and other UTS business units across the Dutch Caribbean. The Curaçao business unit of UTS will be combined with Flow's existing operations there with the promise of bringing faster LTE speeds and coverage with an improved customer experience.

=== Mobile benchmarks and awards ===
Based on drive tests carried out by engineering consulting company, MSI Americas, Flow was rated as the top carrier in the two tested countries; Jamaica and Barbados. In Jamaica, Flow was placed ahead of its competitor in terms of radio frequency quality, 3G throughput, and higher 3G retention. Flow was also rated the faster mobile network in the country, with users to experience on average, above 3 Mbit/s (downlink) on the HSPA+ network. Flow Barbados also placed ahead of its competitor there as well in said categories as well.

In addition, Flow Barbados was also ranked by Ookla as being the best ISP and mobile network in Barbados. Flow was also rated by Ookla as Cayman's fastest mobile and broadband network.

In 2016, P3 Group, a management consultancy headquartered in Aachen, Germany, conducted benchmarks in six Flow Territories (Antigua & Barbuda, the Cayman Islands, Jamaica (pre-LTE), Montserrat, St. Lucia and Turks and Caicos). The finding of these benchmarks concluded that Flow networks were on average 90% better than their competitor, Digicel, in terms of call setup, download and upload speed, latency and video streaming (over YouTube). Raw scores showed that Flow also outranked the competition in voice and data performance at the very least, twice.

In Q2-Q3 of 2018, Flow Jamaica received the distinction by Ookla's Speedtest Awards by being Jamaica's fastest mobile network, with customers seeing speeds averaging at 22.66 Mbit/s on the downlink and 9.62 Mbit/s on the uplink.

=== Radio frequency summary ===
Frequencies used on Flow Mobile Networks
Frequency range	Band number	Protocol	Class	Status	Note(s)
2100 MHz IMT	1	UMTS/HSPA/HSPA+	3G	Active	Active in Bonaire and Curaçao.
1800 MHz DCS	3	LTE/LTE-A	4G	Active	Active in Barbados, Bonaire and Curaçao
1900 MHz PCS	2	UMTS/HSPA/HSPA+/ LTE/LTE-A	3G/4G	Active	Active in all markets. HSPA+ active on 1900 MHz in Jamaica. LTE Band 2 used in Barbados, BVI, Cayman Islands, Dominica and Jamaica.
1700/2100 MHz AWS	4	LTE/LTE-A	4G	Active	Active in Antigua & Barbuda and Jamaica.
850 MHz CLR	5	UMTS/HSPA/HSPA+/ LTE/LTE-A	3G/4G	Active	Active in all markets. HSPA+ active in most markets. LTE Band 5 is used in Barbados and Grenada.
700 MHz SMH A/B/C	12/13/17	LTE/LTE-A	4G	Active	Main LTE Bands (12/17 or 13) in all markets except Barbados.
700 MHz APT	28	LTE/LTE-A	4G	Active/In-Deployment	Used in Curaçao
900 MHz E-GSM	8	LTE/LTE-A	4G	Active/In-Deployment	Used in Curaçao (Refarmed from GSM).
3500 MHz C-Band	n78	NR	5G	Active/In-Deployment	Active in the Cayman Islands.

== Broadband, pay-TV and landline ==
=== Cable TV, HFC and broadband ===
Flow operates HFC networks in the former Columbus Communications markets of Barbados, Curaçao, Grenada, Jamaica, Trinidad, Saint Lucia and Saint Vincent. The network also follows conventions shared with its sister companies such as Virgin Media Ireland & UK, Ziggo, UPC in its choice of CPE; a custom Arris cable modem, capable of speeds up to 1 Gbit/s. The box's nomenclature 'FLOW Connectbox' also finds similarity with its sister brands like Ziggo, with Virgin Media being the only exception with its 'Superhub 3'. The company switched to using a DOCSIS 3.1 Sagemcom F@st 3890 v3 following Liberty Latin America's other markets in the region. DOCSIS 3.1 was rolled out in Trinidad in August 2023.

=== Fibre and wireless broadband ===
LIME, in 2014, began rolling out a fiber-to-the-home (FTTH) network in Barbados. They also have a FTTH network in numerous areas with greenfield deployment in Jamaica and across all of Grand Cayman as well. In January 2023, Flow rolled out a FTTH network in Tobago.
