= CNT EP =

Ecuadorian telecommunications company

Corporación Nacional de Telecomunicaciones (CNT EP)
- Genre: Telecommunications
- Founded: 2008; 18 years ago
- Headquarters: Quito, Ecuador
- Area served: Ecuador
- Website: www.cnt.gob.ec

The Corporación Nacional de Telecomunicaciones, CNT EP is the public telecommunications company in Ecuador that offers fixed telephony services local, regional and international, Internet Access (Dial-Up, DSL, mobile Internet), satellite television and mobile telephony in Ecuadorian territory.

It was founded on October 30, 2008, as a result of the merger of the now defunct Andinatel S.A. and Pacifictel S.A. On January 14, 2010, the CNT S.A. became a public company and was renamed the Corporación Nacional de Telecomunicaciones, CNT EP. Subsequently, July 30, 2010, was the official merger of the Corporación Nacional de Telecomunicaciones, CNT EP with Alegro mobile phone company, allowing the company to enhance their product portfolio by focusing efforts in the packaging business and converged services technology.
