= ECFS (cable system) =

Submarine fibre optic cable system

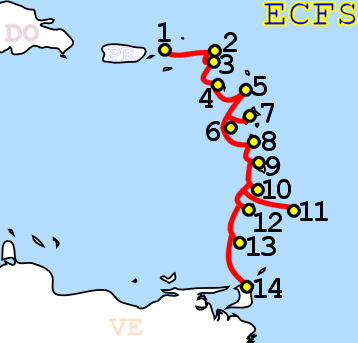

ECFS (East Caribbean Fiber System) is a network of repeaterless fiber optic submarine communications cable that interconnects fourteen (14) eastern Caribbean islands. The cable is 1730 km (1075 mi) in length and runs from the British Virgin Islands to Trinidad in ten (10) segments. It was first installed in September 1995 and was scheduled to be upgraded by Xtera Communications as of April 25, 2013.

== Landing points ==
1. Tortola, British Virgin Islands
2. Anguilla
3. St. Martin
4. St. Kitts & Nevis
5. Antigua
6. Montserrat
7. Guadeloupe
8. Dominica
9. Martinique
10. St. Lucia
11. Barbados
12. St. Vincent
13. Grenada
14. Trinidad

== See also ==
- Cable & Wireless
- List of international submarine communications cables
