= Cable & Wireless Communications =

Latin American communications operator

Cable & Wireless Communications Ltd.
- Industry: Telecommunications
- Headquarters: London, UK
- Revenue: US$ 1.753 billion (2014/15)
- Operating income: US$ 321 million (2014–15)
- Net income: US$ 33 million (2014–15)
- Owner: Liberty Latin America
- Website: www.cwc.com/live/

Cable & Wireless Communications Ltd, operating as C&W Communications and Liberty Caribbean, is a telecommunications company which has operations in the Caribbean and Central America. It is owned by Liberty Latin America and is headquartered in London, UK.

It was formed when Cable & Wireless plc demerged in 2010 to form two companies (the other being Cable & Wireless Worldwide plc, since integrated into Vodafone).

In November 2015, Liberty Global announced it would purchase Cable & Wireless Communications. The company was officially acquired by Liberty Global on 16 May 2016.

Following the split of Liberty Latin America from Liberty Global in 2018, Cable & Wireless became owned by the former, based in Colorado.

The company operates under a number of brands, including C&W Business, C&W Networks, Cable & Wireless Panama, and BTC Bahamas. After Cable & Wireless Communications purchased Columbus Communications in 2015, it replaced its LIME brand with Columbus' Communications subsidiary Flow.

Cable & Wireless Communications rebranded as Liberty Caribbean in June 2025.

== History ==
=== British and transatlantic cables and Eastern Telegraph Company (1852–1901) ===
The origins of Cable and Wireless Communications begin in 1852 when John Pender, a Manchester cotton merchant, joined other businessmen as director of the English and Irish Magnetic Telegraph Company. This company ran a specific point to point telegraph cable service between London and Dublin, but Pender soon began founding numerous other telegraphic cable companies to run similar point to point, national and international telegraph services. Over time, Pender amalgamated these into the single company that would form the basis for Cable and Wireless Communications.

Because of the early development of point to point telegraph services, Cable and Wireless's origins embrace over 50 early telegraph, radio and telecommunications companies, many of them founded by Pender.

Pender was a financier of the Great Eastern Ship which laid the first successful transatlantic telegraph cable in 1866, beginning a new era of international telegraph communications.

In 1869, Pender founded the Falmouth, Gibraltar and Malta Cable Company and the British Indian Submarine Telegraph Company, which connected the Anglo-Mediterranean cable (linking Malta to Alexandria using a cable manufactured by one of Pender's companies) to Britain and India, respectively. The London to Bombay telegraph line was completed in 1870. The London to Bombay cable was the first to land at Porthcurno in Cornwall, a location which became the company's global hub and is now home to its archive and a telegraph museum.

In 1872 the three companies were merged with the Marseilles, Algiers and Malta Telegraph Company to form the Eastern Telegraph Company, with Pender as chairman.

The Eastern Telegraph Company steadily took over a number of companies founded to connect the West Indies and South America, leading to a name change to The Eastern and Associated Telegraph Companies.

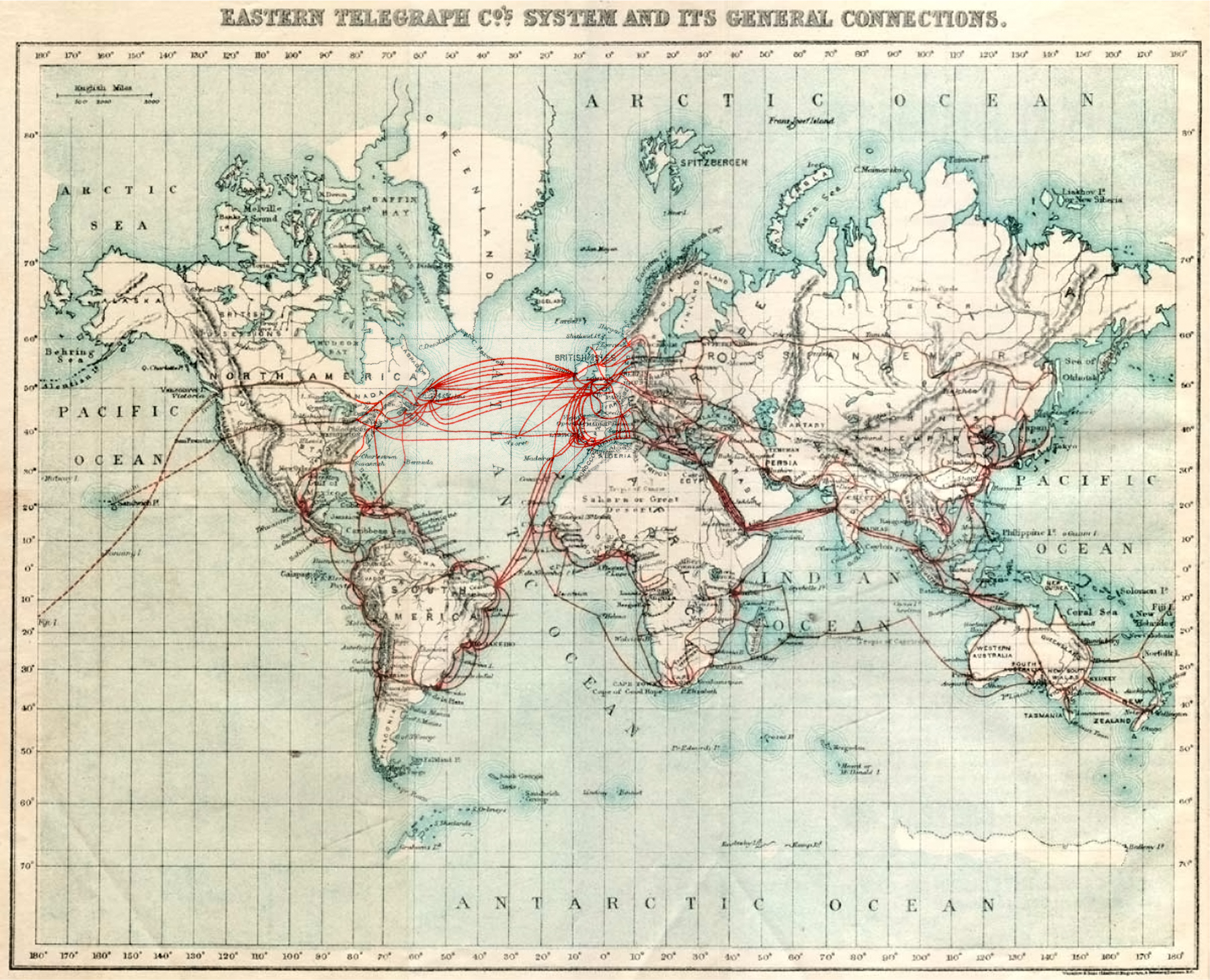
The Eastern Telegraph Company network in 1901

=== Rise of wireless and transition to C&W Ltd (1901–1945) ===
From 1900 the near-monopoly on international communications enjoyed by the cable companies came under threat from the development of wireless radio technology. Marconi's Wireless Telegraph Company gradually developed a chain of ships using short-wave radio communications which could commercially compete with undersea cables. In 1924 Marconi succeeded in telephoning Australia using short wave radio and in the same year was given a contract by the British Post Office to set up circuits with Canada, Australia, South Africa and India (called the Post Office beam wireless service).

The 1928 Imperial Wireless & Cable Conference was convened to establish the best way to manage these two technologies and protect British interests. This led to a decision to merge the communications methods of the British Empire into one operating company, initially known as the Imperial and International Communications Ltd, and changed to Cable and Wireless Limited in 1934. In 1936, Sir Edward Wilshaw was named chairman of the company.

=== Nationalisation and privatisation era (1945–1999) ===
Following the Labour Party's victory in the 1945 general election, the British government announced its intention to nationalise Cable and Wireless, which was carried out in 1947. The company continued to own assets and operate telecommunication services outside the UK, but all assets in the UK were integrated with those of the Post Office, which operated the UK's domestic telecommunications monopoly.

In 1979 the Conservative Party government led by Margaret Thatcher began privatising the nationalised industries. Cable & Wireless was its first privatisation, with the sale of 49% in November 1981 (the remaining 51% was sold in two tranches in 1983 and 1985).

Part of the privatisation included the granting of a licence for a UK telecommunications network, Mercury Communications Ltd, as a rival to British Telecom. It was established as a subsidiary of Cable & Wireless. Barclays and British Petroleum were the other original investors. They were bought out by Cable & Wireless in 1984. Mercury Communications was first licensed in 1982 and became a full public telecommunications operator in 1984.

One2One was established as the trading name of Mercury Personal Communications, a joint venture partnership equally owned by Cable & Wireless and US West International, a division of US WEST Media Group. One2One launched its mobile communications services to the UK market in 1993.

In October 1996, Mercury was merged with three cable operators in the UK (Vidéotron, NYNEX and Bell Cablemedia) and renamed Cable & Wireless Communications (in which Cable & Wireless plc owned a 53% stake).

Following this, the group embarked on a major disposal programme, selling One2One to T-Mobile in 1999, then selling its stake in CWC's consumer operations to NTL in 2000 (now Virgin Media).

=== International expansion of C&W (1981–2006) ===
During this period Cable & Wireless entered several markets which remain important parts of the Cable & Wireless Communications Group.

In 1997, Cable & Wireless bought a 50% share of the Panamanian INTEL (Instituto Nacional de Telecomunicaciones). After the deal, the company was called Cable & Wireless Panama.

In 2004, the group purchased a controlling stake in Monaco Telecom from Vivendi Universal.

=== Transition to a demerger (2006–2010) ===
In 2006, group chairman Sir Richard Lapthorne made the decision to split the business into two divisions: 'Cable & Wireless International' – which managed the group's telecommunications companies in various countries; and 'Cable & Wireless Europe, Asia and US' – focused on the enterprise market with a strong presence in the UK. In November 2009, the Cable and Wireless plc board announced its intention to demerge.

=== Pan-America focus (2010 to date) ===
The companies demerged on 26 March 2010 into Cable & Wireless Communications (formerly Cable & Wireless International) and Cable & Wireless Worldwide (formerly Cable & Wireless Europe, Asia and US). Cable & Wireless Worldwide was subsequently purchased by Vodafone on 27 July 2012.

Cable & Wireless Communications in 2010 had a global portfolio of telecoms operators in small and medium-sized markets. The company's board determined that it would be difficult to generate the economies of scale needed in the telecoms industry from such a diverse portfolio and so determined to focus the business in the Pan-America region where it owns a number of businesses in the Caribbean and Panama.

Between 2010 and 2013 the company divested a number of businesses including in Bermuda, the Channel Islands and Isle of Man, Maldives, South Atlantic and Macau. The company also purchased a 51% shareholding in The Bahamas Telecommunications Company on 7 April 2011.

In 2014 Cable & Wireless Communications sold its stake in Monaco Telecom to the French entrepreneur Xavier Niel.

On 17 November 2015, Liberty Global confirmed it had made an offer to buy the company. Both companies reached an agreement on the offer in February 2016.

In 2018, Liberty Latin America was spun off from Liberty Global and Cable & Wireless became owned by Liberty Latin America.

== Operations ==
In the Pan-America region Cable & Wireless Communications owns 14 businesses in the Caribbean and has a minority stake (49%) in TSTT in Trinidad and Tobago. In Panama it owns 49%, and has management control, of Cable & Wireless Panama, the leading full service telecoms business in Panama.

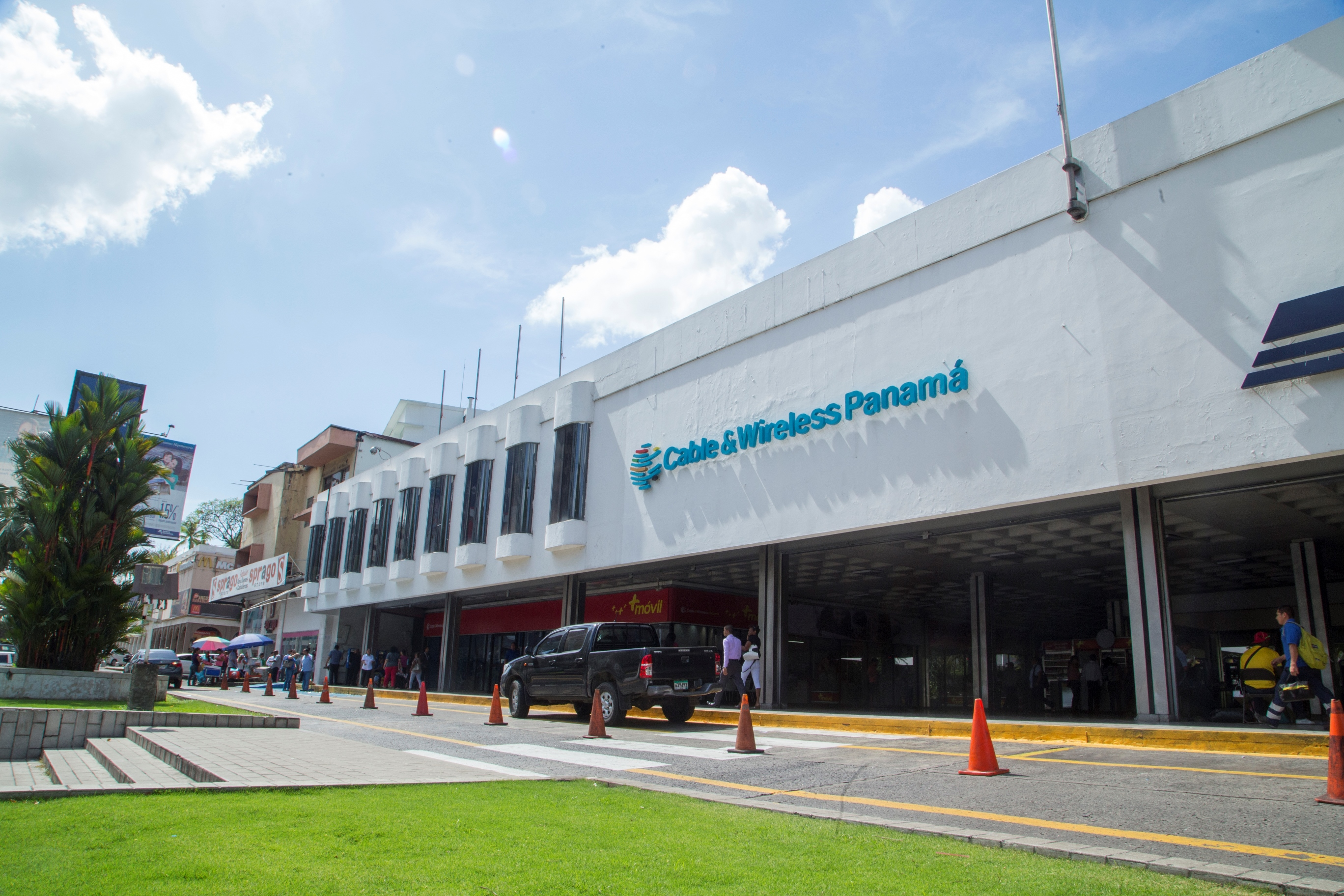
Cable & Wireless Panama and +Movil building in Via España, Panama

=== Panama ===
Its Panama business, which trades as Cable & Wireless Panama, is a provider of mobile, fixed line, broadband and pay TV services in that country. They also provide telecoms services to enterprises and governments.

Telephone services were state run by the INTEL (Instituto Nacional de TELecomunicaciones, National Telecommunications Institute, not to be confused with Intel Corporation) until 1997, when a 49% stake was sold to Cable & Wireless plc, rebranding as Cable & Wireless. In 2010, this stake was transferred to Cable & Wireless Communications. In 2019, Liberty Global's subsidiary Liberty Latin America, took over Cable & Wireless Communications' stake in the company, rebranding as +Movil, which was formerly Cable & Wireless' brand for mobile services in the country.

=== Caribbean ===
In the Caribbean, Cable & Wireless Communications trades as Flow, except in The Bahamas where the business is branded BTC. It is a full-service telecoms provider and is the leader in most of the markets it serves and services it provides.

Cable & Wireless Communications also owns a minority stake (49%) in Telecommunications Services of Trinidad and Tobago (TSTT).

=== Seychelles ===
Cable & Wireless Communications operated in the Seychelles as Cable & Wireless Seychelles. In November 2019, Liberty Latin America sold Cable & Wireless Seychelles to local investors.

== See also ==
- All Red Line
- Porthcurno Telegraph Museum
- List of telecommunications regulatory bodies
