= LIME (telecommunications company) =

Caribbean telecommunications company

- Industry: Mobile telecommunications
- Founded: 3 November 2008
- Defunct: 7 May 2015
- Parent: Cable & Wireless Communications
- Website: Archived official website at the Wayback Machine (archived 2015-12-25)

LIME, an acronym for Landline, Internet, Mobile, Entertainment, was a communications provider owned by the British based Cable & Wireless Communications for its operations in Anguilla, Antigua and Barbuda, Barbados, British Virgin Islands, Cayman Islands, Dominica, Grenada, Jamaica, Montserrat, Saint Kitts and Nevis, Saint Lucia, Saint Vincent and the Grenadines and Turks and Caicos Islands in the Caribbean.

The company formed from the integrated businesses of Cable & Wireless in the Caribbean which adopted the LIME name on 3 November 2008. LIME operated as the native, incumbent telecommunications service provider in many of the islands where they reside.

The company also operated mobile telecommunications under the bmobile brand from 2003 until rebranding them as LIME in 2008. Competitors include Digicel (largest mobile competitor).

Cable & Wireless Communications, LIME's parent company, also owns a 49% share in TSTT in Trinidad & Tobago and a 49% share in BaTelCo in The Bahamas.

The company was the only authorized carrier licensed by Apple to sell iPhones under contract, as well as being the only approved carrier for use (by Apple) in the English-speaking Caribbean. This was obtained in 2011 after Claro's exit from the Jamaican market.

In 2015, LIME's parent company acquired Columbus Communications and decided to adopt the brand name FLOW for its consumer-facing business, replacing the LIME name. As of May 2016, the LIME name was fully discontinued.

== Services ==
- International and domestic voice telephone services;
- Data/IP services such as ADSL, Frame, or ISDN;
- Mobile/Wireless services including 3G, 4G across smartphone platforms such as Samsung and Apple.
- Other services including satellite-based communications and television services for select countries.

== Background ==
The history of Cable & Wireless' network build-out in the Caribbean region dates back to the 1880s. In recent times the West Indies unit has been considered 'key' in global revenue turnover.

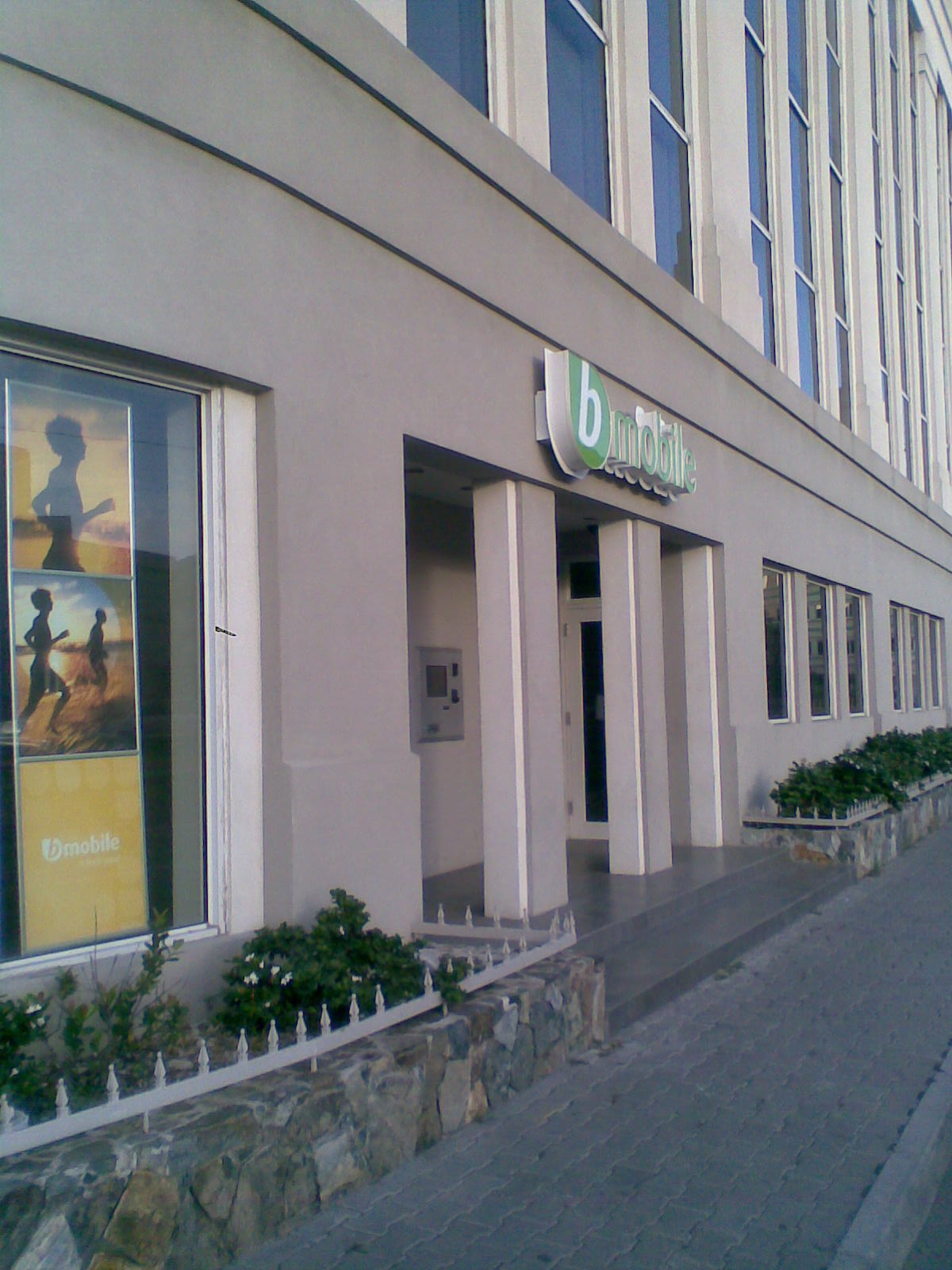
bmobile's headquarters in the BVI.

bmobile won one of the three franchises to offer cellular telephone services in the British Virgin Islands in 2007. However, rival operator Digicel issued court proceedings against the British Virgin Islands regulator, arguing that he had acted improperly by imposing a limit of three licenses (one of which was awarded to a local cable television company and has not been exercised). bmobile was joined to the suit as an interested party. High Court Judge Rita Joseph-Olivetti found in favour of Digicel and quashed the original decision, which had been controversial. However, despite the court's ruling, Digicel received a license to operate in the Territory in 2008. Digicel lost separate proceedings against Cable and Wireless (as bmobile's parent company) in the English courts, claiming that Cable & Wireless has unfairly stifled competition in several Caribbean jurisdictions. During the intervening period, bmobile has obtained a virtual stranglehold on the cellular telecommunications market in the British Virgin Islands by a combination of low prices and aggressive advertising, as well as significant investment in infrastructure and technology.

=== Cable & Wireless plc regional profits ===
In 2005 according to the 2005 Cable & Wireless plc annual report:

- United Kingdom turnover: £1,602 million
- Caribbean turnover: £550 million
- Panama turnover: £257 million
- Macau turnover: £117 million
- Monaco Telecom turnover: £100 million
- Rest of the World turnover: £167 million
- Figures are from the financial report released to its shareholders the current listed financial breakdown for CWPLC is aforementioned by regional business segment.

In March 2010 the Cable & Wireless plc split into Cable & Wireless Worldwide plc (now a subsidiary of Vodafone) and Cable & Wireless Communications plc (now a subsidiary of Liberty Latin America). LIME had prior became a subsidiary of C&W Communications.

In November 2014, the brand's parent company, Cable & Wireless Communications announced its merger with Columbus Communications. The merger has since become a hot button in the region especially since the company's largest competitor, Digicel lacks sufficient fixed line voice and data capability. This would make the amalgamated entity hold a monopoly on such services. The merger, despite being green lit by key markets such as Jamaica, is still being awaited regulatory approval by other markets.

In April 2015, it was announced that the brand was to be retired in favor of the name FLOW in Summer 2015, which was the customer-facing brand name of the Columbus Communications. Reasons cited by the company for the name change were results from an independent study which indicated that customers perception of LIME's brand was that of lackluster customer service and at times, spotty service. The study also found FLOW's to be much more positive and all round well received. This name change will occur across all the markets in which Cable & Wireless Communications operates as LIME.

== See also ==
- ECFS (cable system)
