= Cable & Wireless Worldwide =

British multinational telecommunications services company

Cable & Wireless Worldwide PLC
- Traded as: LSE: CW
- Industry: Telecommunications
- Founded: 26 March 2010; 16 years ago
- Defunct: 1 April 2013; 13 years ago
- Fate: Absorbed into Vodafone
- Headquarters: Bracknell, England, UK
- Revenue: £2,257 million (2011)
- Operating income: £170 million (2011)
- Net income: £209 million (2011)
- Website: vodafone.com/business/global-enterprise

Cable & Wireless Worldwide PLC (informally Cable & Wireless) was a British multinational telecommunications services company headquartered in Bracknell, United Kingdom. It was formed in 2010 by the split of Cable & Wireless plc into two companies, the other being Cable & Wireless Communications serving Central America and the Caribbean (and now a part of Liberty Latin America).

Cable & Wireless Worldwide specialised in servicing large corporates, governments, carriers and resellers and its services included managed voice, data and IP-based services. It had operations in Asia Pacific, Europe, India, the Middle East & Africa and North America. The company was bought by Vodafone in July 2012 and integrated into the business on 1 April 2013.

== History ==
The company was formed on 26 March 2010, made up of the remaining business of Cable & Wireless plc following the demerger of the company's international division to form Cable & Wireless Communications. The split meant that the FTSE 100 Index temporarily held 101 firms, before Cable & Wireless Communications dropped to the FTSE 250 Index.

Following the split, CWW went through a tumultuous period – its shares, which hit a high of 98.5 pence after the split, valuing the group at $4.25 billion; fell to 13 pence in November 2011, increasing speculation it would be a takeover target.

On 28 June 2011, the board of Cable & Wireless Worldwide accepted the resignation of Jim Marsh and announced that John Pluthero, the then-Chairman, would become Chief Executive. On 14 November 2011, Cable & Wireless Worldwide announced that it had appointed the former Vodafone Group executive Gavin Darby as its new chief executive.

On 23 April 2012, Vodafone announced an agreement to acquire Cable & Wireless Worldwide for £1.04 billion.

Vodafone, who was looking to strengthen its integrated corporate services business arm – Vodafone Global Enterprise, bid for CWW with Tata Communications Ltd. also in the fray. Vodafone became the sole bidder after Tata group withdrew; and on 23 April 2012, Vodafone announced an agreement to acquire the operations of CWW for £1.04 billion in cash. On 18 June 2012, CWW shareholders voted in favour of the Vodafone offer, exceeding the 75% of shares necessary for the deal to go ahead. Vodafone was advised by UBS AG, while Barclays and Rothschild advised Cable & Wireless.

The acquisition gave Vodafone access to CWW's fibre network for businesses, enabling it to take unified communications solutions to large enterprises in UK and globally; and expand its enterprise integration service offerings in emerging markets.

The purchase was completed on 30 July 2012, and one-time CWW employee and CEO of Vodafone Global Enterprise Nick Jefferey was appointed as CEO of CWW. Cable & Wireless was fully integrated into Vodafone on 1 April 2013.

== Executive remuneration ==
Shareholder groups repeatedly warned about excessive executive remuneration at the company. Before it split into two separately listed companies in early 2010, Cable & Wireless suffered one of the biggest shareholder rebellions in 2009 when 38% of the shareholder register failed to back the company's pay policy at a fiery meeting. The company's highly controversial long-term incentive plan (LTIP) was calculated on 10% of the company valuation and was claimed to pay out to senior managers; in fact the members of the LTIP were the only executive directors who for the year 2009/2010 shared a £60 million bonus pool.

== See also ==
- All Red Line
- Imperial Wireless Chain
