= Telecommunications Authority of Trinidad and Tobago =

- TATT
- Logo

Agency overview
- Formed: July 1, 2004; 22 years ago
- Jurisdiction: Government of Trinidad and Tobago
- Headquarters: 5 Eighth Avenue Extension, Barataria, San Juan, San Juan–Laventille, Trinidad and Tobago; 10°38′37″N 61°27′58″W
- Employees: 104
- Annual budget: TT$67,318,800 (2021/2022)
- Minister responsible: Dominic Smith, Minister of Public Administration and Artificial Intelligence
- Agency executives: Chris Seecharanm, Chairman; Jerome Khan, Deputy Chairman
- Parent department: Ministry of Public Administration and Artificial Intelligence
- Website: www.tatt.org.tt

The Telecommunications Authority of Trinidad and Tobago (TATT) is the independent regulatory body that oversees the telecommunications and broadcasting services in Trinidad and Tobago. It mandate also reportedly includes managing spectrum and numbering resources, setting service standards, promoting sector liberalisation and creating investment to ensure nationwide access to reliable and affordable communications services. The Ministry of Public Administration and Artificial Intelligence is the government department that has responsibility for the TATT, the current Minister is Dominic Smith.

The Telecommunications Authority of Trinidad and Tobago was formed in July 2004, upon full proclamation of the Trinidad and Tobago Telecommunications Act 2001, as amended by the Trinidad and Tobago Telecommunications (Amendment) Act 2004.

Its board of directors consists of chairman Chris Seecharanm, Deputy chairman Jerome Khan and directors Mentor Baptiste, Dr Justin Koo, Avanti Supersad, Russel Romero, Suresh Boodoo, Dion Khan and Danielle Pounder.
