= Digicel =

Jamaican multinational telecommunications company

DIGICEL
- Industry: Telecommunications
- Founder: Denis O'Brien
- Headquarters: Kingston, Jamaica
- Area served: Caribbean
- Products: Mobile, Fixed Broadband, Wireless Broadband, Satellite Television, Cable, Home Security
- Revenue: $2.8 billion (2015)
- Owner: Denis O'Brien
- Number of employees: ~6,500 (2018)
- Subsidiaries: Trend Media; Symptai Consulting; iDOM Technologies
- Website: digicelgroup.com

Digicel is a Jamaican-based Caribbean mobile phone network and home entertainment provider, operating in 25 markets worldwide.

Digicel has operated in several countries, including Guyana, Fiji, Haiti, Trinidad and Tobago, Samoa, St. Lucia, Suriname, Papua New Guinea, and Jamaica. In 2024, a group of U.S. private equity firms took over control of the company as part of debt restructuring.

== History ==
Digicel was founded in 2001 by Irish entrepreneur Denis O'Brien. The company launched in April 2001 in Jamaica. In March 2003, Digicel expanded to St. Lucia and St. Vincent. In 2005, Digicel purchased Cingular Wireless’ Caribbean and Bermudan operations.

In April 2006, Digicel launched its services in Trinidad and Tobago. In May 2006, Digicel began operations in Haïti. Between 2006 and 2008, Digicel expanded into the Central American mainland, as well as the Pacific. In September 2006, it acquired an unrelated mobile phone provider: Digicel Holdings in El Salvador.

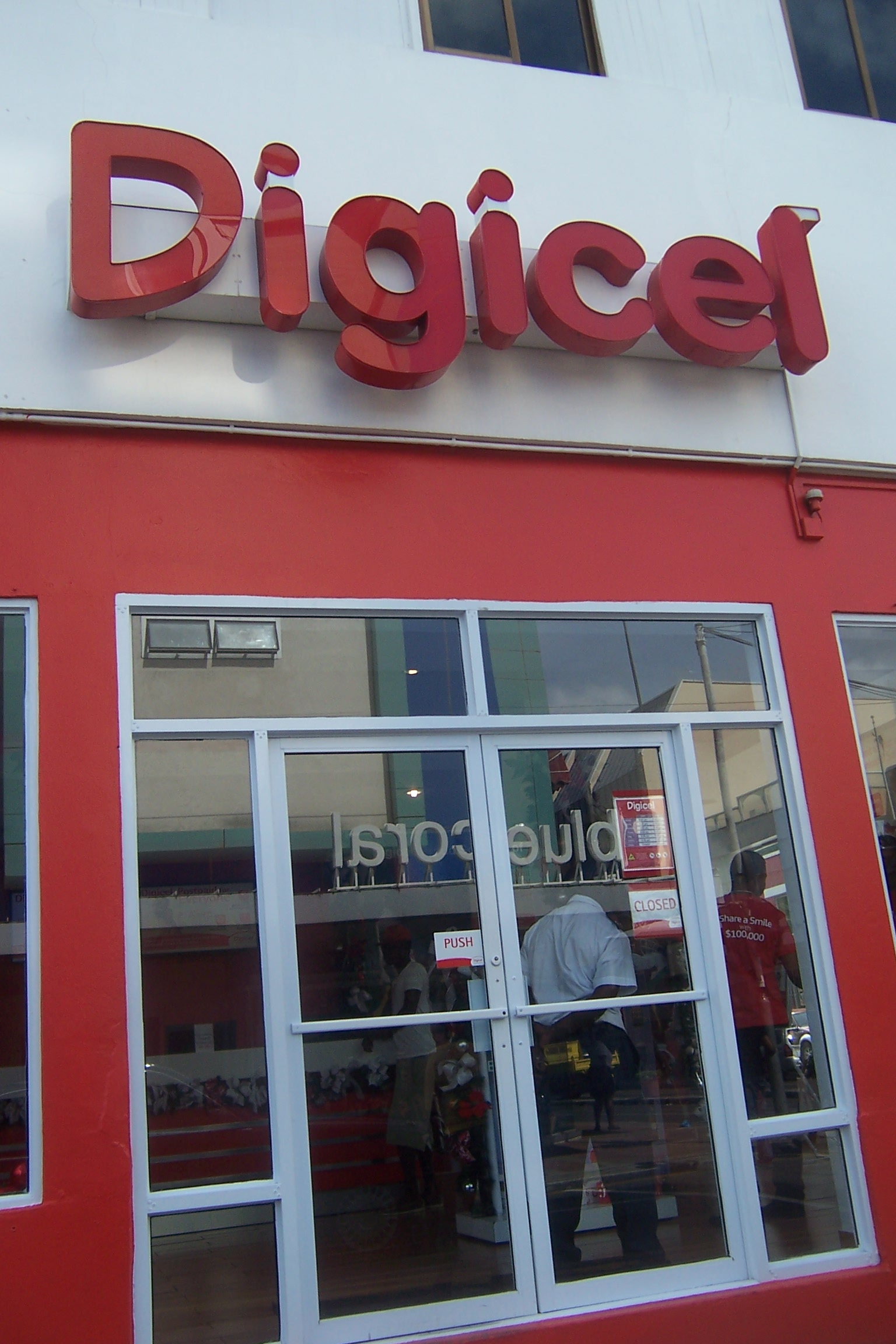
A Digicel storefront in Castries, Saint Lucia, in 2012

In 2007, Digicel acquired U*Mobile in Guyana, and launched in Suriname in December.

=== OUR court rulings ===
In April 2002, Digicel received permission from Jamaica's then-minister of industry, commerce and technology, Phillip Paulwell, to disregard the interconnectivity fee ceiling issued by the Offices of Utilities Regulation (OUR). Following a judicial review, it was determined that Paulwell did not have the power to make this decision. Digicel appealed the ruling to the Jamaican Supreme Court in 2003 and won. OUR appealed the decision to the appellate court, which ruled Paulwell's decision was outside his powers and OUR didn't have to comply with Paulwell's directive. Digicel appealed to the Privy Council, Jamaica's final court of appeal, which upheld the appellate court's decision in 2007.

Digicel appealed the decision to the United Kingdom Privy Council. In January 2010, the Council ruled in favour of the OUR, meaning LIME (formerly Cable & Wireless Jamaica) was allowed to keep the J$340 million Digicel had been ordered to pay them by the Jamaican courts. In 2015, LIME's parent company acquired Columbus Communications and decided to adopt the brand name FLOW for its consumer-facing business, replacing the LIME name. As of May 2016, the LIME name was fully discontinued.

=== 2010–present ===
Digicel Mobile Money, a mobile banking service, was launched in Fiji in July 2010. Also in 2010, Digicel launched TchoTcho, a cash app for money transfers to phones in Haiti. In 2011, Mobile Money in Fiji was expanded to allow transfers to and from Australia and New Zealand at no cost. In February 2011, Digicel took a controlling stake in Netxar Technologies, a leading systems integrator in the Caribbean region. In March, Digicel announced that it was selling its operations in Honduras and El Salvador to Mexican telecom company América Móvil, and América Móvil was selling its operations in Jamaica to Digicel. In March 2012, Digicel acquired Comcel/Voila, its main competitor in Haiti.

In May 2012, the Tax Authority Jamaica (TAJ) visited Digicel's offices in New Kingston with an order from the Jamaican Supreme Court to look for data regarding the company's payment of the general consumption tax. A couple of weeks later, TAJ and Digicel agreed to have more dialogue surrounding the situation. In October 2012, América Móvil announced it wouldn't acquire Digicel's operations in El Salvador.

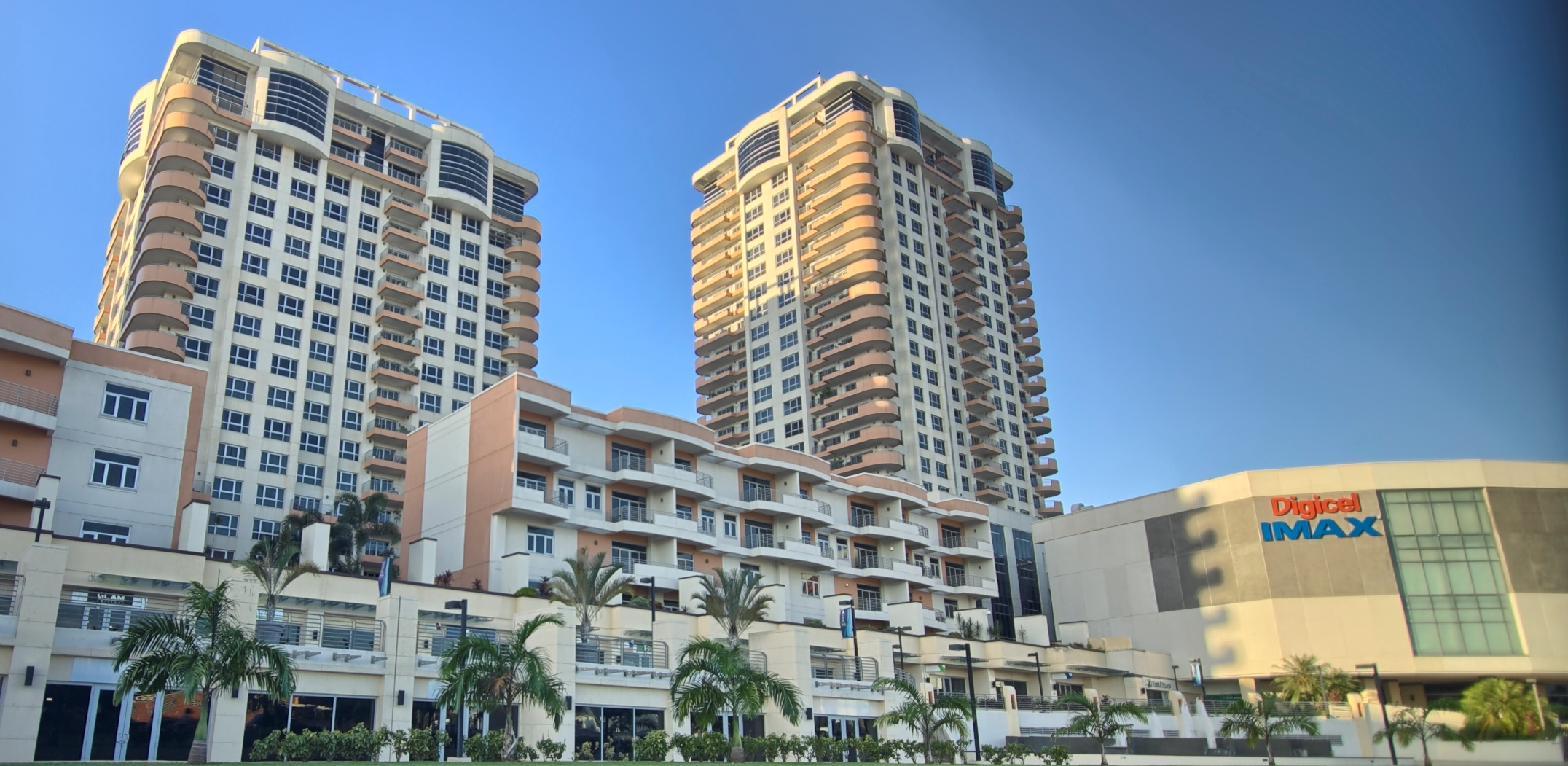
Digicel IMAX theater in the suburb of Woodbrook in Port-of-Spain, Trinidad & Tobago

In June 2013, Digicel announced that it would invest $9 billion in a mobile phone network in Myanmar, if granted a licence. However, Digicel lost the licence bid to Telenor and Ooredoo. Digicel acquired SAT Telecom, a cable and internet company in Dominica, in February 2014 and relaunched the brand as Digicel Play in October of that year. In September, Digicel acquired Telstar Cable Limited in Jamaica. In 2015, TchoTcho was relaunched as MonCash with additional banking services. In September 2016, Digicel Play launched as Play Go, a live streaming service. In July 2017, Digicel bought 16.6% of Tonga Cable from the government. In January 2019, O'Brien named Jean-Yves Charlier as chief executive, replacing Michael Willner. Jean-Yves stepped down as the Group CEO of Digicel in July 2020, and Oliver Coughlin was named the CEO for Digicel's Caribbean and Latin American business.

In May 2020, Digicel announced plans to restructure its debt. The restructuring plan was approved by Digicel's bondholders and completed in June 2020. As part of the exchange, O'Brien contributed $50 million in assets to Digicel, consisting of the company's Jamaican headquarters and $25 million in cash. In November 2020, Digicel announced that, in its financial second quarter to the end of September, its earnings have dropped due to impact of the COVID-19 pandemic.

In October 2021, Digicel announced the sale of its Pacific operations to Telstra Group, an Australian telecommunications company. The sale was estimated at US$1.6 billion. However this was thrown into doubt in March 2022 when the Papua New Guinea government imposed a retrospective tax of over $100m on the company.

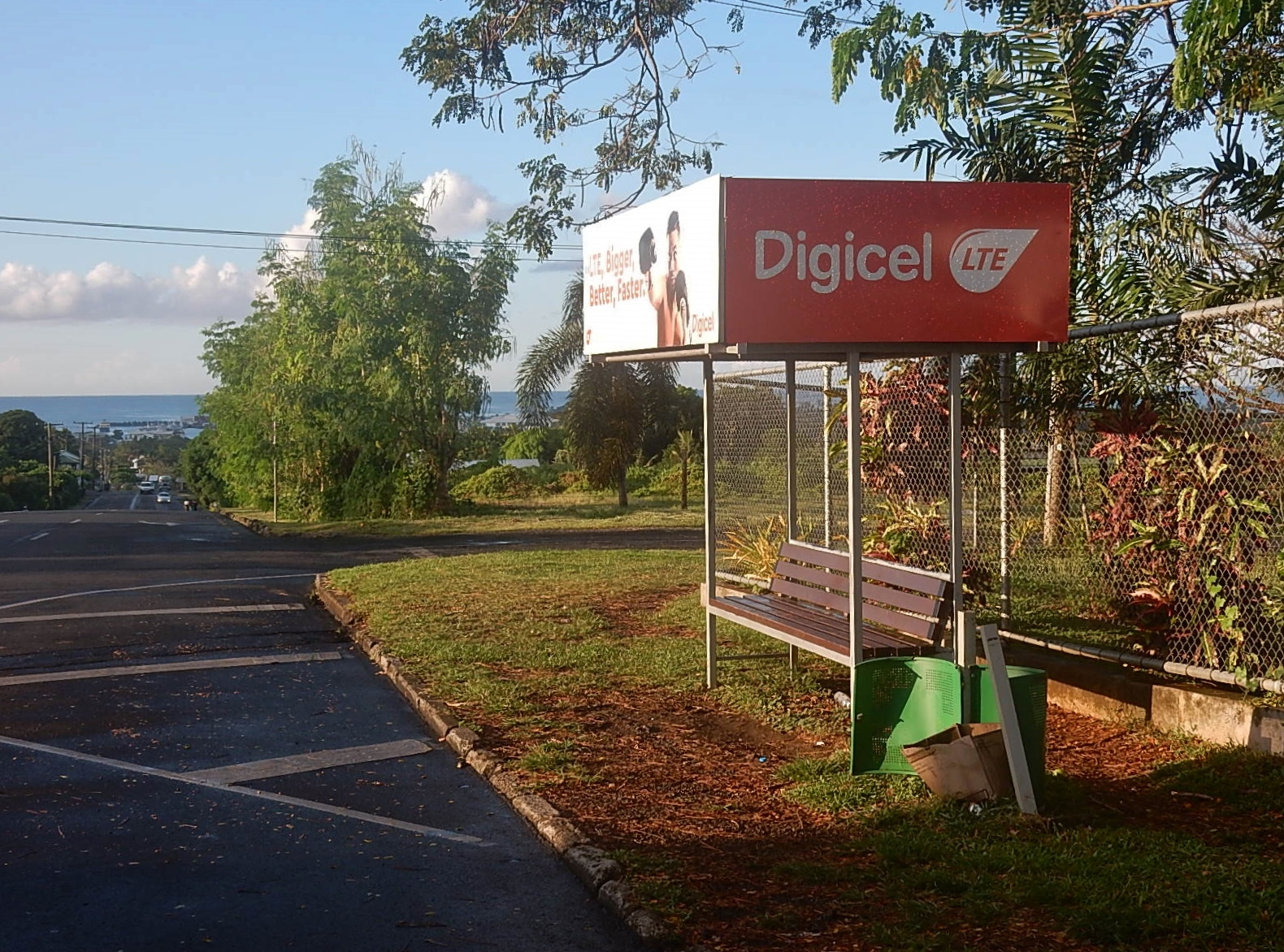
An outdoor Digicel ad on a bus shelter in Tonga

In September 2022, credit rating service Fitch issued a warning of a potential debt default. The Irish Times suggested "there's little or no equity value in Digicel to chase". On September 11, 2023, Digicel Group filed for Chapter 15 bankruptcy in the United States Bankruptcy Court for the Southern District of New York. On November 29, 2023. Rajeev Suri was appointed as the new Chairman of Digicel Group.

On April 20, 2024, Digicel ceased operations in Panama after failing to award the tender to operate and exploit the personal communications service, after the bidding process concluded without award due to the withdrawal of the only interested company. Digicel's exit from the Panamanian market occurred in a context of significant changes in the country's telecommunications sector, including the merger of Cable & Wireless Panama and Claro Panama, which reduced the number of main operators in the market. Following the announcement, Digicel asked its customers to switch to another network within 30 days from March 2024 to retain their phone numbers. In July 2025, Digicel announced that it will pivot from consumer-facing media to scalable, enterprise-grade services within Digicel Business and as such will be closing its operations of Loop News and SportsMax. This news followed an earlier announcement that Digicel had fully acquired the cyber security firm Symptai Consulting Ltd.

== Corporate sponsorship ==
Digicel is a sponsor of Caribbean, Central American and Asia-Pacific sports teams, including the Special Olympics teams in these regions. From 2005 to 2018, Digicel sponsored The West Indies cricket team.

In 2008, Digicel announced that they would sponsor the Vanuatu national cricket team, as well as the National Rugby 15s and 7s teams. That same year, Digicel became the sponsor of the Digicel Cup for rugby in Fiji. In April 2013, Digicel was announced as the first global sponsor of the 2013 inaugural tournament for the Caribbean Premier League. In 2021, Digicel sponsored the PlayGo Emerge Competition for short films made in the Caribbean.

=== Digicel Foundation ===
In 2004, Digicel and its shareholders set up the Digicel Foundation in Jamaica. The Digicel Foundation is active in Jamaica, Haïti, Trinidad and Tobago and Papua New Guinea. In Haïti, the Digicel Foundation helped rebuild after the 2010 Haïtian earthquake struck Port-au-Prince in January 2010. Projects have included building primary schools and restoring the historic Iron Market.

== Digicel Group’s mobile operations ==
The following is a list of Digicel Group's Pacific operations. These operations are headed by an office in Port Moresby, Papua New Guinea, as well as one in Singapore. Digicel's Pacific operations were acquired by Australian telecommunications company Telstra on July 14, 2022.

Digicel Asia Pacific Territories
Country/Territory	GSM Bands	UMTS Bands	LTE Bands	5G NR Bands	Local Sites
Fiji	GSM-900	1, 8	3, 28	?	Digicel Fiji
Nauru	GSM-900	8	3	—N/a	Digicel Nauru
Papua New Guinea	GSM-900, GSM-1800	8	3, 28	—N/a	Digicel Papua New Guinea
Samoa	GSM-900	8	3	—N/a	Digicel Samoa
Solomon Islands	GSM-900	8	3	—N/a	Digicel Solomon Islands
Tonga	GSM-900	8	3	?	Digicel Tonga
Vanuatu	GSM-900	8	28	—N/a	Digicel Vanuatu

The following is a list of the North Atlantic, Caribbean and Central American operations of Digicel Group. All report to Digicel Group's headquarters in Kingston, Jamaica.

Digicel Caribbean & Central American Territories
Country/Territory	GSM Bands	UMTS Bands	LTE Bands	NR Bands	Local Sites
Anguilla	GSM-900	2, 8	12, 17	—N/a	Digicel Anguilla
Antigua and Barbuda	Decommissioned	2, 5	12, 17	—N/a	Digicel Antigua & Barbuda
Aruba	GSM-900	8	1, 3	—N/a	Digicel Aruba
Barbados	Decommissioned	1, 8	2, 12, 17	?	Digicel Barbados
Bermuda	GSM-1900	5	2, 13	n78	Digicel Bermuda
Bonaire	GSM-900, GSM-1800	1, 5	3	—N/a	Digicel Bonaire
British Virgin Islands	GSM-1800, GSM-1900	2	4, 13	—N/a	Digicel British Virgin Islands
Cayman Islands	Decommissioned	5	1, 3, 13	n78	Digicel Cayman Islands
Curaçao	GSM-900, GSM-1800	1, 5	3	—N/a	Digicel Curaçao
Dominica	GSM-900, GSM-1900	1, 8	2, 8, 12, 17	—N/a	Digicel Dominica
El Salvador	GSM-900	8	2	—N/a	Digicel El Salvador
French Guiana	GSM-900	1	3, 7, 20	—N/a	Digicel French Guiana
Grenada	GSM-900, GSM-1800	2	2, 8, 12, 17	—N/a	Digicel Grenada
Guadeloupe	GSM-900, GSM-1800	1, 8	3, 7	—N/a	Digicel French Windies & French Guiana
Guyana	GSM-900	2, 5	3, 28	—N/a	Digicel Guyana
Haiti	GSM-900, GSM-1800	1, 5	1, 3, 5	—N/a	Digicel Haiti
Jamaica	Decommissioned	5	2, 4, 5, 12, 17, 66	—N/a	Digicel Jamaica
Martinique	GSM-900, GSM-1800	1, 8	1, 3, 7	—N/a	Digicel Martinique
Montserrat	GSM-850, GSM-1900	2, 8	12, 17	—N/a	Digicel Montserrat
Saint Barthelemy	GSM-900	1	1, 3, 7, 20	—N/a	Digicel Saint Martin & Saint Barths
Saint Kitts and Nevis	GSM-900, GSM-1800	2, 8	2, 12, 17	—N/a	Digicel Saint Kitts & Nevis
Saint Lucia	GSM-900, GSM-1800	2, 8	2, 8, 12, 17	—N/a	Digicel St. Lucia
Saint Martin	GSM-900	1	1, 3, 7, 20	—N/a	Digicel Saint Martin & Saint Barths
Saint Vincent and the Grenadines	GSM-900, GSM-1800	2, 8	2, 12, 17	—N/a	Digicel Saint Vincent & the Grenadines
Suriname	GSM-900, GSM-1800	1, 5	3	—N/a	Digicel Suriname
Trinidad and Tobago	GSM-850	2, 5	2, 4, 28	—N/a	Digicel Trinidad & Tobago
Turks and Caicos Islands	GSM-900	2	4, 12, 17	—N/a	Digicel Turks & Caicos

=== Past mobile networks ===
The following is a list of networks previously operated by Digicel.

Digicel Caribbean & Central American Territories
Country/Territory	GSM Bands	UMTS Bands	LTE Bands
Antigua and Barbuda	GSM-900	—N/a	—N/a
Barbados	GSM-900 / GSM-1800	—N/a	—N/a
Cayman Islands	GSM-900	—N/a	—N/a
Jamaica	GSM-900	2	—N/a
Panama	GSM-1900	2	2, 28

== Competitors ==
In the Caribbean region, the main competitor is American-owned Liberty Latin America.

== Brands ==
Brand	Industry	Status
Digicel Business	Business Solutions	Active
Digicel+	Home & Entertainment	Active
Symptai Consulting	Cyber Security, Digital Transformation & Anti-Money Laundering	Active
Trend Media	Advertising Technologies, Marketing & Communications Solutions	Active
iDOM Technologies	Cyber Security, Digital Transformation, Internet Access	Active
CEEN TV	Television, Entertainment	Defunct
D'Music	Music Streaming	Defunct
Loop News	News Publishing	Defunct
SportsMax	Television, Sports & Entertainment	Defunct

== See also ==
- Southern Caribbean Fiber
- List of mobile network operators of the Americas
- List of telecommunications regulatory bodies
