= Charles Clancy =

American computer scientist

- Born: Charles Clancy
- Education: Rose–Hulman Institute of Technology; University of Illinois Urbana-Champaign; University of Maryland, College Park
- Occupations: Computer scientist, Electrical engineer
- Employer: MITRE Corporation
- Known for: Cybersecurity, Wireless communications, Artificial intelligence
- Title: Chief Technology Officer, MITRE Corporation
- Awards: Fellow of the Institute of Electrical and Electronics Engineers (IEEE)

Charles Clancy is an American computer scientist and electrical engineer, and currently serves as the chief technology officer at the Mitre Corporation.

He previously was the Bradley Distinguished Professor of Cybersecurity at Virginia Tech. Additionally he has co-founded several companies including HawkEye 360 and Federated Wireless.

He was named a Fellow of the Institute of Electrical and Electronics Engineers "for leadership in security and wireless communications".

== Early life and education ==
Clancy graduated with a bachelors degree in Computer Engineering from the Rose–Hulman Institute of Technology, masters degree in Electrical Engineering from the University of Illinois Urbana-Champaign, and doctorate in Computer Science from the University of Maryland, College Park. He started his career as researcher with the National Security Agency.

== Career ==
=== Academia ===
Clancy joined Virginia Tech in 2010 to launch the Hume Center for National Security and Technology, and was named Associate Professor of Electrical and Computer Engineering and the center's first permanent director in 2011.

His research focused on wireless communications, cybersecurity, and artificial intelligence. He was a driving force behind the Commonwealth Cyber Initiative and served as its first interim director. In 2018 he was named the Bradley Distinguished Professor of Cybersecurity.

Clancy's research in spectrum sharing shaped the technical approach to the Citizens Broadband Radio Service, and he chaired the Wireless Innovation Forum spectrum sharing security working group that developed the system's security standards. Additionally his work on using neural networks for signal processing influenced the use of artificial intelligence in the cellular radio access network.

=== Private Sector ===
Clancy co-founded several technology companies, including Federated Wireless and HawkEye 360.

In 2019, Clancy joined the Mitre Corporation as vice president for intelligence programs, and was subsequently named senior vice president for MITRE Labs in 2020, and chief technology officer in 2023
