= Federal Office of Bundeswehr Equipment, Information Technology and In-Service Support =

Agency of the German armed forces

Coordinates: 50.3581°N 7.6036°E

- Bundesamt für Ausrüstung, Informationstechnik und Nutzung der Bundeswehr (BAAINBw)

Agency overview
- Formed: 1 October 2012
- Type: Federal Office
- Jurisdiction: Government of Germany
- Headquarters: Koblenz, Germany
- Employees: 6,800
- Minister responsible: Boris Pistorius, Federal Minister of Defence
- Agency executive: Annette_Lehnigk-Emden, President
- Parent agency: Federal Ministry of Defence
- Website: www.baainbw.de

The Federal Office of Bundeswehr Equipment, Information Technology and In-Service Support (Bundesamt für Ausrüstung, Informationstechnik und Nutzung der Bundeswehr; BAAINBw) is a German government agency for equipping the German armed forces (Bundeswehr) with modern weapon systems considering cost efficiency aspects. In doing so, it is responsible for developing, assessing and procuring weapon systems. It was founded in 2012 by merging the Bundesamt für Wehrtechnik und Beschaffung (BWB) and Bundesamt für Informationsmanagement und Informationstechnik (IT-AmtBw) with the goal of producing synergies. The Bundeswehr Technical and Airworthiness Center for Aircraft is a branch of the agency.

The BAAINBw is located in Koblenz, Rhineland-Palatinate and directly reports to the Federal Ministry of Defence (Germany) located in Bonn and Berlin.

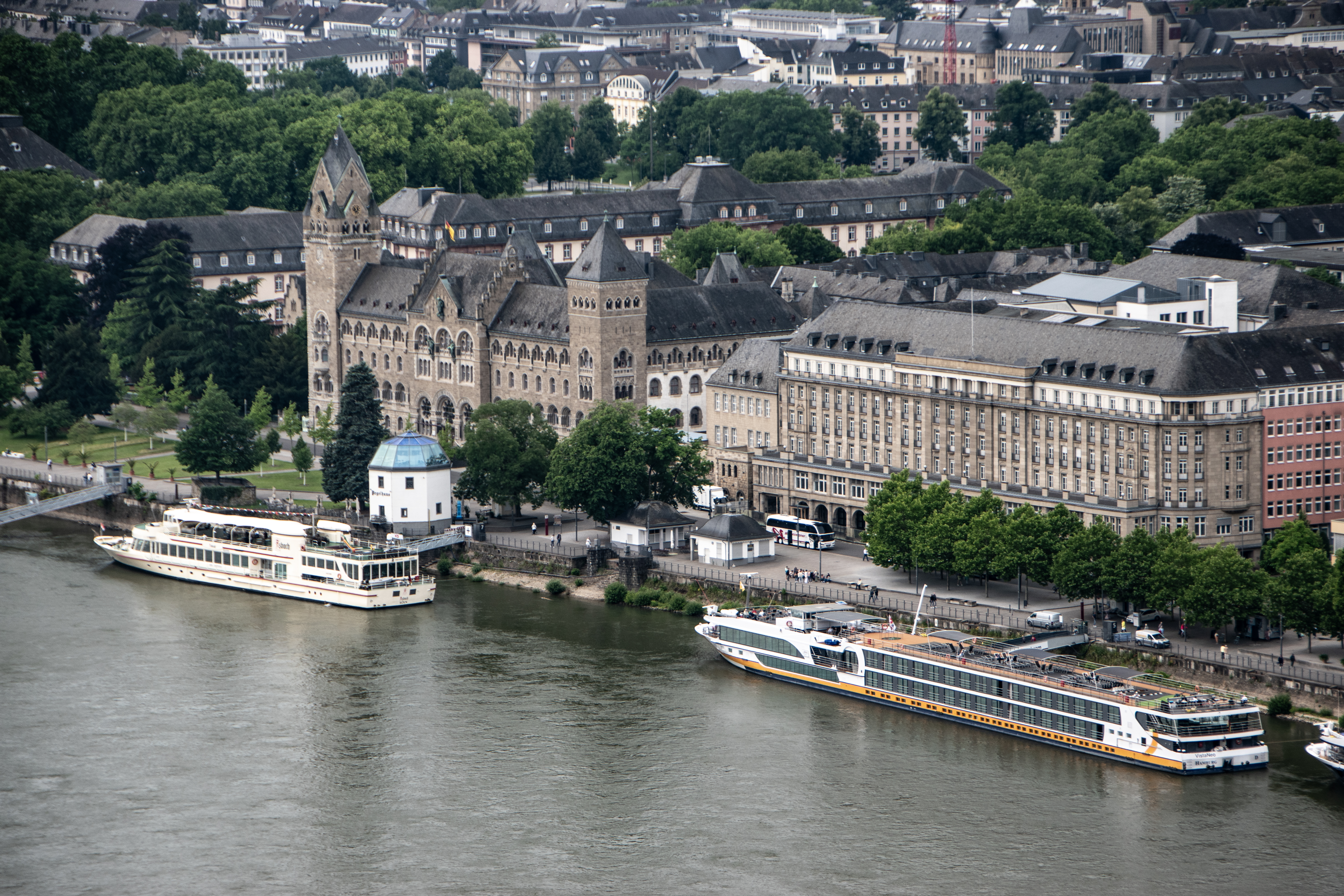

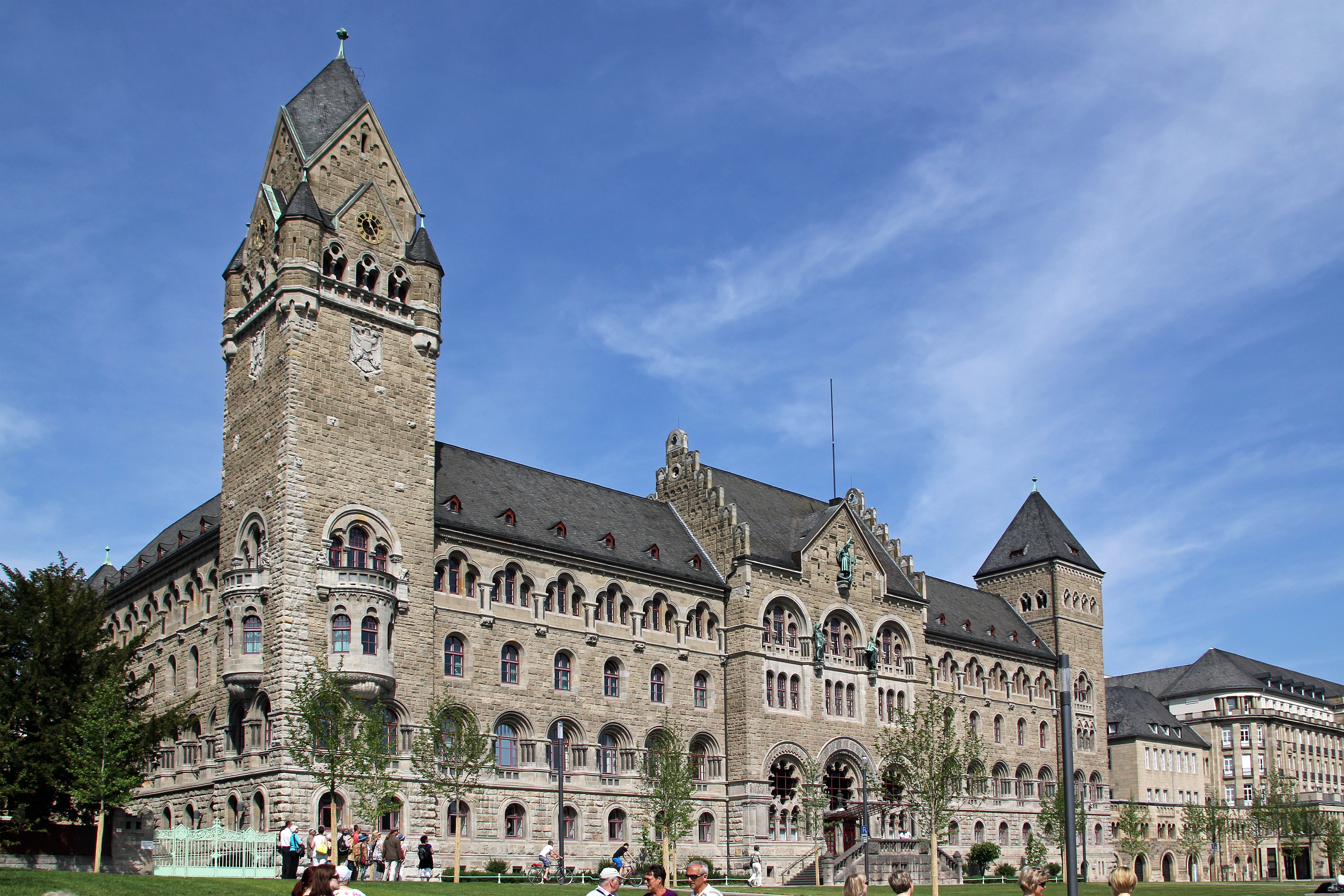
Headquarters of BAAINBw in Koblenz

== History ==
In 1957, under protest of a large part of the citizens, the Adenauer government decided to rearm West Germany and the Bundeswehr was set up in 1956. On November 14, 1957, the then Defense Minister Franz Josef Strauss (CSU) set up the Office for Defense Technology and Procurement (Bundesamt für Wehrtechnik und Beschaffung, BWB). Among other things, he was responsible for the central procurement of material for the Bundeswehr.

As a result of an agreement on mutual defense assistance, the new Bundeswehr received its first arms deliveries from the USA in its early days.

After the attacks of 9-11 in 2001 and the political decision for "unrestricted solidarity" (Schröder) with the USA, the Bundeswehr became an "army in action". The focus of the operations is now concentrated on dry and hot zones, tropical material is needed, the vehicles are retrofitted with air conditioning and many other devices, materials and processes are adapted to these special conditions. The communication systems are also being adapted and satellite and HF radio are being expanded.

In 2002, the Federal Office for Information Management and Information Technology of the Bundeswehr (IT-AmtBw Federal Office for Information Management and Information Technology of the Bundeswehr) was founded as a central service provider for IT-systems of Bundeswehr.

In 2012 all departments that are concerned with equipment, maintenance and operational readiness of the Bundeswehr were combined into today's BAAINBw.

In Koblenz an employee of BAAINBw was arrested in August 2023 for alleged agent activity for Russia. Thomas H. is said to have contacted the Russian embassy and consulate general in Bonn several times of his own accord to offer cooperation and to transmit information from his professional environment to a Russian intelligence service. According to SWR information, he was noticed when the Office for the Protection of the Constitution was monitoring Russian facilities in Germany.
