= HawkEye 360 =

American radio signal analytics company

HawkEye 360, Inc.
- Type: Public
- Traded as: NYSE: HAWK
- Founded: September 16, 2015
- Founders: Chris DeMay; Charles Clancy; Bob McGwier
- Headquarters: Herndon, VA
- Area served: Worldwide
- Key people: John Serafini (CEO)
- Products: RF data and analytics
- Number of employees: 150 (2022)
- Website: www.he360.com

HawkEye 360 is an American geospatial analytics company headquartered in Herndon, Virginia. The company specializes in the collection and analysis of radio frequency (RF) signal location data using a constellation of satellites.

== History ==
HawkEye 360 was founded in 2015 by Chris DeMay, Charles Clancy, and Bob McGwier to leverage small satellites for the commercial collection and geolocation of RF signals. The company received seed financing from Allied Minds, a venture capital firm based in Boston.

In 2016, HawkEye 360 began contracting the construction of their Pathfinder cluster of satellites with Deep Space Industries (DSI) and University of Toronto Institute for Aerospace Studies Space Flight Laboratory (UTIAS SFL). In November 2016, the company completed a Series A round led by Razor's Edge Ventures with major participation from Raytheon. During this period, the company also received a patent for a method of determining the location of RF transmitters.

The company's advisory board includes former members of the National Geospatial-Intelligence Agency, former Army and Air Force officers, and former members of the intelligence community.

In December 2018, HawkEye 360 launched the company's first set of small satellites, known as the Pathfinder cluster, into orbit as part of Spaceflight's SSO-A SmallSat Express ride-share aboard a SpaceX Falcon9. As of 2024, all satellites are still operational.

In April 2019, it released its first product, RFGeo, whose purpose was to identify and locate RF signals so customers can then view and analyze data. In August 2019, the company announced a $70 million series B financing round.

In October 2019, HawkEye 360 expanded the company's signal waveform library to include ultra-high frequency (UHF) band and L band frequencies, and an update to RFGeo. The company's signal expansion into the UHF band enabled monitoring of push-to-talk radios, which could aid discovery of cross-border smuggling operations and poaching. The update to RFGeo includes a process to extract vessels' MMSI identifiers to match it to its specific broadcasts. The RFGeo update also includes a catalog of previously collected RF Geo data so customers can order and access archived data.

In December 2019, the National Reconnaissance Office (NRO) granted HawkEye 360 a contract to explore combining commercial RF capabilities into NRO's geospatial intelligence architecture. Also in 2019, the U.S. Federal Communications Commission (FCC) approved a license allowing HawkEye 360 to eventually launch up to 80 incremental satellites for the eventual steady-state operation of a 15-cluster constellation.

In 2020, the National Air and Space Museum added a full-size model of one of HawkEye 360's Pathfinder satellites to display in their museum as part of an upcoming exhibit detailing the story of the space age.

In 2021, the company launched its second and third satellite clusters as well as announcing raising $55 million in a series C financing round and $145 million in a series D financing round.

In 2022, the company launched its fourth and fifth satellite clusters and opened a manufacturing facility to enable constructing satellites in-house.

In 2023, the company launched its sixth and seventh satellite clusters, as well as raising $68 million in a series D-1 funding round. The series D-1 funding round included an investment from and strategic agreement with defense contractor Lockheed Martin. As of October 2023, HawkEye 360's total capital raised was $378 million.

In December 2023, HawkEye 360 acquired Maxar Intelligence's RF Solutions business unit (formerly Aurora Insight) for an undisclosed amount.

HawkEye 360 has plans to execute and maintain a 30-satellite constellation, and the company has launched a total of ten clusters to-date. UTIAS SFL has supported the development of all ten clusters, with some clusters built directly by SFL and others built in-house by HawkEye 360 with SFL providing technical support.

On 4 May 2025, the US Defense Security Cooperation Agency approved a Foreign Military Sales to India for the sale of HawkEye 360 technology to enhance its maritime domain awareness in the Indo-Pacific. The sale, worth $131 million, includes SeaVision software and other operational support including training.

On 10 April 2026, HawkEye 360 filed for an initial public offering, submitting their registration statement on Form S-1 to the Securities and Exchange Commission, taking the first formal step toward a public listing and trading on the New York Stock Exchange under ticker “HAWK”. On 7 May 2026, HawkEye 360 Inc. began trading on the New York Stock Exchange.

== Technology ==
HawkEye 360 operates trios of compact satellites, known as clusters, which orbit the Earth at altitudes between 400 and 600 kilometers. These satellites employ a unique water propulsion system that enables them to maintain a specific formation, crucial for accurately triangulating and charting signal locations.

Each satellite (also referred to as a Hawk) in the cluster has a Software-Defined Radio (SDR) with the ability to detect a wide range of radio frequencies. Once all three satellites have picked up on a common signal, they can trilaterate that signal with accuracies dependent upon the terrain, signal, and other factors.

Clusters 2 and beyond feature several enhancements relative to the pathfinder cluster. These new satellites are equipped with the capability to simultaneously gather multiple RF signals, enabling the creation of multi-layered RF data. Additionally, each satellite features an upgraded Software Defined Radio (SDR) for capturing higher quality data, leading to more precise geolocation. Furthermore, these satellites possess enhanced processing power, allowing them to manage larger volumes of data.

As of November 2026, 16 clusters have been launched (including the Pathfinder cluster), for a total of 45 hawk satellites currently in orbit:

Flight No.	Mission	COSPAR ID	Launch date	Launch vehicle	Orbit altitude	Inclination	Number deployed	Deorbited
1	Hawk Pathfinder	2018-099H 2018-099AN 2018-099AT	3 December 2018	Falcon 9 Block 5	570 km x 589 km	97.6°	3	0
2	Hawk 2	2021-006CW 2021-006CZ 2021-006CT	24 January 2021	Falcon 9 Block 5	522 km x 534 km	97.4°	3	0
3	Hawk 3	2021-059CG 2021-059BE 2021-059BX	30 June 2021	Falcon 9 Block 5	508 km x 532 km	97.6°	3	0
4	Hawk 4	2022-033L 2022-033J 2022-033P	1 April 2022	Falcon 9 Block 5	493 km x 505 km	97.4°	3	3
5	Hawk 5	2022-057AB 2022-057AA 2022-057Y	25 May 2022	Falcon 9 Block 5	522 km x 538 km	97.5°	3	0
6	Hawk 6	2023-011D 2023-011A 2023-011C	24 January 2023	Electron	551 km x 555 km	40.5°	3	0
7	Hawk 7	2023-054P 2023-054R 2023-054Y	15 April 2023	Falcon 9 Block 5	498 km x 511 km	97.4°	3	0
8	Hawk 8	2024-066B 2024-066D 2024-066H	7 April 2024	Falcon 9 Block 5	589 km x 594 km	45.6°	3	0
9	Hawk 9	2024-066E 2024-066J 2024-066G	7 April 2024	Falcon 9 Block 5	586 km x 591 km	45.6°	3	0
10	Hawk 10	2024-149CA 2024-149CF 2024-149DM	16 August 2024	Falcon 9 Block 5	594 km x 597 km	97.7°	3	0
11	Hawk 11	2024-247F 2024-247C 2024-247E	21 December 2024	Falcon 9 Block 5	481 km x 485 km	45.0°	3	0
12	Hawk 12	2025-137C 2025-137B 2025-137A	26 June 2025	Electron	518.3 km x 499.0 km 517.7 km x 499.6 km 518.5 km x 498.8 km	97.4464° 97.4523° 97.4405°	3	0
13	Hawk 13	2026-004AF 2026-004AK 2026-004AG	11 January 2026	Falcon 9 Block 5	508.8 km x 502.1 km 509.5 km x 501.4 km 508.7 km x 502.2 km	97.4537° 97.4603° 97.4658°	3	0
14	Hawk 14	2026-067AJ 2026-067W 2026-067AB	30 March 2026	Falcon 9 Block 5	509.9 km x 506.6 km 508.7 km x 507.7 km 509.4 km x 507.0 km	97.4804° 97.4742° 97.4679°	3	0
15	Hawk 15	2026-237J 2026-237K 2026-237L	20 October 2026	Falcon 9 Block 5	592.6 km x 584.2 km 593.0 km x 584.3 km 591.6 km x 583.6 km	52.9858° 52.9879° 52.9859°	3	0
16	Hawk 16	2026-239C 2026-239B 2026-239A	23 October 2026	Electron	530.3 km x 510.2 km 529.9 km x 510.2 km 529.5 km x 510.4 km	97.4667° 97.4612° 97.4614°	3	0

Together with cluster 12, HawkEye 360 also launched a fourth satellite, named Kestrel-0A. This is an experimental satellite designed to evaluate emerging capabilities and future technology enhancements and this satellite is also fully operated by HawkEye 360.

Flight No.	Mission	COSPAR ID	Launch date	Launch vehicle	Orbit altitude	Inclination	Number deployed	Deorbited
12	Kestrel-0A	2025-137D	26 June 2025	Electron	499.1 km x 481.8 km	97.4462°	1	0

HawkEye 360 operated two spectrum scanning satellites obtained from its purchase of Maxar's RF Solutions unit:

Mission	COSPAR ID	Launch date	Launch vehicle	Orbit altitude	Inclination	Number deployed	Deorbited
Charlie	2021-006AD	24 January 2021	Falcon 9 Block 5	357 km x 367 km	97.3°	1	1
Delta	2023-084BH	6 June 2023	Falcon 9 Block 5	469 km x 482 km	97.5°	1	1

== Uses ==
=== Maritime usage ===
In order to maintain maritime visibility, most vessels are mandated to use Automatic Identification System (AIS) beacons aboard vessels to locate them. Although AIS is a useful tool, there are many ways it can be rendered ineffective. Ships can turn their beacons off, effectively making them very difficult to detect and track. Other times, ships will input invalid coordinates (referred to as spoofing), so as to appear miles from their true location. Lastly, in high-traffic areas such as ports, it is difficult to distinguish vessels' signals due to the high density of RF activity.

HawkEye 360 collects and analyzes RF frequencies used by ships for navigation to see vessels true locations and fill gaps in AIS information. This information regarding illicit maritime activity could help in global efforts to combat pirating and illegal fishing.

=== Security and defense ===
Data collected by HawkEye 360 is used to monitor high-risk regions for unusual activity. For instance, HawkEye 360 observed increased RF activity in the Galwan River Valley off the China-India border, which enabled tasking of Earth observation imagery that revealed a Chinese military buildup in the area that was contributing to regional unrest to include dozens of reported military casualties. This remote monitoring allows operatives to have an advantage of a more comprehensive understanding of an area before entering.

=== Telecommunications ===
HawkEye 360 is used to monitor frequency spectrum usage, to allow for planners to see in advance which areas have the highest density of RF activity and how spectrum resources can be dynamically deployed for use in that area. Monitoring could also eventually enable telecommunications firms to more easily determine which bands are under-utilized in order to more efficiently deploy spectrum resources.

=== Crisis Response ===
Using the company's satellites, HawkEye 360 can locate RF signals emitted by activated emergency beacons, which will decrease the time and effort of search and rescue operations. In instances of natural disasters, HawkEye 360 will be able to detect and assess the health of operational towers to ensure access to viable modes of communication for first responders and survivors.
