= Etherstack =

Coordinates: 51°16′25″N 0°46′00″W

Etherstack (ASX:ESK)
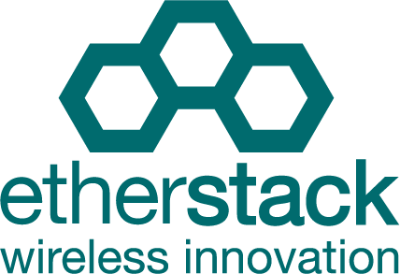
- Company type: Public
- Industry: Communications and software communications architecture
- Founded: 1995 in Sydney, Australia
- Headquarters: Sydney, Australia
- Number of locations: 5
- Area served: Worldwide
- Key people: David Deacon (CEO); David Carter (CFO)
- Products: Wireless systems 3GPP Network elements
- Number of employees: 55
- Divisions: Public Safety, Utilities & Resources Defence & Tactical Communications MCPTX (3GPP) & IWF
- Subsidiaries: Etherstack Pty Ltd (Australia) Etherstack Inc. (USA) Etherstack (Japan) Inc. (Japan) Etherstack Wireless Ltd (UK) Auria Wireless Pty Ltd (Australia), Indian Pacific Nederland B.V. (NL/EU)
- Website: www.etherstack.com

Etherstack is a provider of wireless communications software for the land mobile radio and defense industries in Europe, Asia, and North America. Their products include wireless protocol stacks, IP-based communication networks, software-defined radio, and Software Communications Architecture (SCA)-compatible waveforms.

Etherstack develops and licences wireless technology to third-party vendors. It is a licensor of standards-based APCO P25, DMR, TETRA, and NATO technology.

== History ==
Etherstack was founded in 1995 in Australia as a provider of hardware-independent air interface protocol stacks (waveforms), including for MPT-1327, DMR, TETRA, NATO, and APCO P25 standards. The company has developed the US Telecommunications Industry Association (TIA) APCO P25 standards starting in 2003, including sitting as chair of several of the TIA TR-8 P25 working groups.

In 2001, a software abstraction of the TETRA protocol stack developed by Etherstack was used by Racal (now part of Thales) in the development of a covert TETRA radio, designed for use by UK police and UK special forces. In 2006, Etherstack joined with Aeroflex to develop products for performing tests against the TIA P25 air interface protocol standards. In 2007, Etherstack had branched out into digital RF transceiver design and established its first RF research and development group in Reading, United Kingdom. The team developed Etherstack's small form factor software-defined radio. The XR-25 also hosted Etherstack's first FIPS 140-2 certified cryptographic module under its Nexus Wireless brand. Etherstack began working with the safety and security business unit of Cisco Systems in late 2007.

In 2008, Etherstack signed a second contract with the Swedish Defence Material Administration for the continued development and support of a TETRA-based mobile station using Etherstack's TETRA SCA waveform as part of the US–Swedish JTRS cooperation project. The National Law Enforcement and Corrections Technology Center Communications Technologies Center of Excellence announced in January 2009 that it would launch a pilot of the APCO P25 radio network in Cape May County, New Jersey, that would integrate Etherstack's land mobile radio network controller software.

In March 2011, Etherstack and Alcatel-Lucent demonstrated an integration of a native P25 PTT call over an LTE cellular network to a traditional narrowband P25 network using the ISSI standard at the Bell Labs facility in New Jersey.

Etherstack's SFFR-6 Tactical Repeater product (aka "Go Box") was evaluated in June 2022 by the US Department of Homeland Security and given the highest score in comparison to other tactical repeaters under evaluation. Etherstack has developed a 3GPP-compliant inter-working function to pass through P25, TETRA, and DMR radio networks. In 2022, AT&T announced that Etherstack was the supplier of its 3GPP LMR-IWF network element for its nationwide United States FirstNet system for first responders.

== Offices and ownership ==
Etherstack plc (UK) has been incorporated since 2006. The company is majority Australian owned and listed on the Australian Securities Exchange. The company has offices in New York, London, Yokohama, and Sydney.

== See also ==
- Software-defined radio
- Land Mobile Radio
- Software Communications Architecture
