= Federated Wireless =

American communications company

- Industry: Telecommunications
- Founded: 2012; 14 years ago
- Founder: Jeffrey H. Reed, Charles Clancy, Robert McGwier and Joseph Mitola
- Headquarters: Arlington County, Virginia
- Key people: Iyad Tarazi (CEO)
- Website: www.federatedwireless.ai

Federated Wireless is an American SaaS company serving the telecom sector and headquartered in Arlington County, Virginia. The company is "commercializing CBRS shared spectrum for 4G and 5G wireless systems" as the SAS provider for a majority of the market.

== History ==
Federated was founded in 2012 by Jeffrey H. Reed, Charles Clancy, Robert McGwier and Joseph Mitola, who subsequently co-applied for a number of patents relating to the operation of shared spectrum for wireless networks. The company was created to develop technology to enable the operation of Citizens Broadband Radio Service (CBRS), and is "backed by communications industry stalwarts" such as Charter Communications, American Tower Corporation and Arris. Other investors include Allied Minds, Cerberus, GiantLeap Capital, GIC, Fortress Investment Group, Pennant Investors, SBA Communications, and Schroders.

In late 2013, Federated Wireless was one of four organizations named as new members by the Wireless Innovation Forum, along with Google, Nordia Soft and the research organization Idaho National Laboratory. The company also supports implementation of a "fully functional [Spectrum Access System] (SAS), capable of managing the proposed three-tier framework" for CBRS spectrum sharing. Iyad Tarazi, who had left an executive position at Sprint Corporation in a March 2014 restructuring, joined the company as CEO in September 2014. In August 2016, Federated Wireless, along with Google, Nokia, Intel, Qualcomm and Ruckus Wireless, launched the CBRS Alliance to "foster the ecosystem" around the 3.5 GHz band. Federated Wireless is on the CBRS Alliance board of directors, with director Sarosh Vesuna as the organization's treasurer.

The company has worked closely with others in the broadband communications space "to develop standards and equipment to bring the idea to life". In September 2017, Federated Wireless launched its Spectrum Controller. In April 2018, Verizon Communications announced that it was working with companies including Federated "on system testing across the 3.5GHz CBRS spectrum band". In May 2018, Verizon Communications announced the deployment of CBRS in its commercial network in Florida with Federated Wireless, Ericsson and Qualcomm. Until October of 2019 the company was a subsidiary of Allied Minds. Today Federated Wireless is an independent, incorporated organization that provides innovative cloud-based wireless infrastructure services to extend the access of carrier networks.

In June of 2024, Federated Wireless launched its Adaptive Network Planner (ANP) to enable operators of all sizes to achieve carrier-grade deployments through high modeling accuracy using real-time shared spectrum network data. The company also announced Tarana as a customer for FCC-certified Automated Frequency Coordination (AFC) in the 6 GHz band that allows the deployment of standard power and outdoor access points. In January 2025, Federated Wireless announced its private 5G networking technology is under a 42-month sustainment contract valued at over $6 million with the Marine Corps Logistics Command (LOGCOM) at the Albany, Georgia, logistics hub. Representing the Department of Defense’s (DoD) first commercial 5G private network, the technology was developed in collaboration with industry partners including JMA and Hewlett Packard Enterprise (HPE). In May 2025, the company said that their market share grew from 44% to 58%, attributing its success to partnerships with service providers including NextLink, Rise Broadband, GVEC, and Cox.

== See also ==
- Federal Communications Commission
- Wireless security
- Wireless WAN
- Wireless access point
