= European Secure Software-defined Radio =

Paneuropean military integration project for radio

Lead Nation Participant Observer Other PESCO states

European Secure Software-defined Radio (ESSOR) is a planned European Union (EU) Permanent Structured Cooperation project for the development of common technologies for European military software-defined radio systems, to guarantee the interoperability and security of voice and data communications between EU forces in joint operations, on a variety of platforms.

== History ==
The project was based on United States' Software Communications Architecture and Joint Tactical Radio System, to which Thales was a major contributor. Germany initially did not participate in ESSOR, developing instead its own SDR system, Streitkräftegemeinsame, verbundfähige Funkgerät-Ausstattung.

== Consortium ==
The work of development is being carried out by a consortium of private companies, one from each member country, including Thales (FR), Leonardo (IT), Indra Sistemas (SP), Radmor (PL), Bittium (FI) and Rohde & Schwarz (DE).

== See also ==
- Permanent Structured Cooperation
- Organisation for Joint Armament Cooperation
