= Software Communications Architecture Reference Implementation =

The Software Communications Architecture Reference Implementation (SCARI) is an implementation of the US Military's Joint Tactical Radio System (JTRS) Software Communications Architecture (SCA) Core Framework. It was developed mainly by the Canadian Communications Research Centre (CRC) under contract by the Software Defined Radio Forum (now Wireless Innovation Forum).

The code is openly available, as well as the full documentation, which is extensively cross-referenced with the original SCA specification documents.

== History ==
The initial release of SCARI was based on version 2.1 of the SCA (released in mid-2001). This first release was developed by the CRC in collaboration with Defence Research and Development Canada (DRDC).

In 2004 the SDR Forum contracted Canada's CRC one more time, in order to upgrade the SCARI to version 2.2 of the SCA (released in late 2001). This time CRC collaborated with three private companies and two US Government entities:

- ISR Technologies (Canada),
- Mercury Computer Systems (USA),
- Rohde and Schwarz (Germany),
- Joint Tactical Radio System (JTRS), and
- the NASA Glenn Research Center (GRC).

The CRC team was successful in getting the SCARI-Open tested for SCA compliance by JTEL. It was accomplished in only 6 days.

In November 2013, the CRC licensed its SCARI technologies to NordiaSoft, a spinoff from CRC.

== Different product versions ==
Three different SCARI products exist:

- SCARI-Open is written in the Java programming language and is freely publicly available
- SCARI++ is written in C++ and is not a free product
- SCARI-Hybrid includes the SCA CF written in Java and uses C++ for the signal processing (DSP) functionality
