= SpeakEasy =

SpeakEasy was a United States military project to use software-defined radio technology to make it possible to communicate with over 10 different types of military radios from a single system.

== History ==
"The SpectrumWare project applied a software-oriented wireless communications approach with distributed signal processing. The research direction of the SpectrumWare project was heavily influenced by two software radio efforts: the military SpeakEasy project and the commercial products of the Steinbrecher Corporation.

According to Upmal and Lackey in “SPEAKeasy, the Military Software Radio” IEEE Communications Magazine (NY: IEEE Press) 1995, the SpeakEasy project was started in 1991 and was the first large-scale software radio. SpeakEasy was motivated in large part by the communications interoperability problems that resulted from different branches of the military services having dissimilar (non-interoperable) radio systems. This lack of communications interoperability can be directly linked to casualties in several conflicts. SpeakEasy had a very aggressive goal of implementing ten different radio waveforms in software on a single platform. The designers chose the fastest DSP available at the time, the Texas Instruments TMS320C40 processor, which ran at 40 MHz. Since this was not enough processing power to implement all of the waveform processing, the system boards were designed to each support four ’C40s as well as some FPGAs.

In 1994, Phase I was successfully demonstrated; however it involved several hundred processors and filled the back of a truck. Moore’s Law provides a doubling in speed every eighteen months, and since it had taken three years to build the system and write all of the software, two doublings had taken place. This seemed to indicate that the number of processors could be reduced by a factor of four. However, SpeakEasy could not take advantage of these newer faster processors, and the reason was the software.

The software was tied to ’C40 assembly language, plus all of the specialized glue code to get four C40s to work together with the code for the particular chosen FPGA. The observation was that it had taken three years to write software for a platform that Moore’s Law made obsolete in eighteen months. Further-more, a software radio pushes most of the complexity of the radio into software, so the software development could easily become the largest, most expensive part of the system. These observations led to software portability being a key goal of the SpectrumWare project."

== See also ==
- Software Communications Architecture (SCA)
- European Secure Software-defined Radio (ESSOR) http://www.occar.int/36
- Joint Radio System of the German Armed Forces (SVFuA)
- GNU Radio
