= Communication systems of the Bundeswehr =

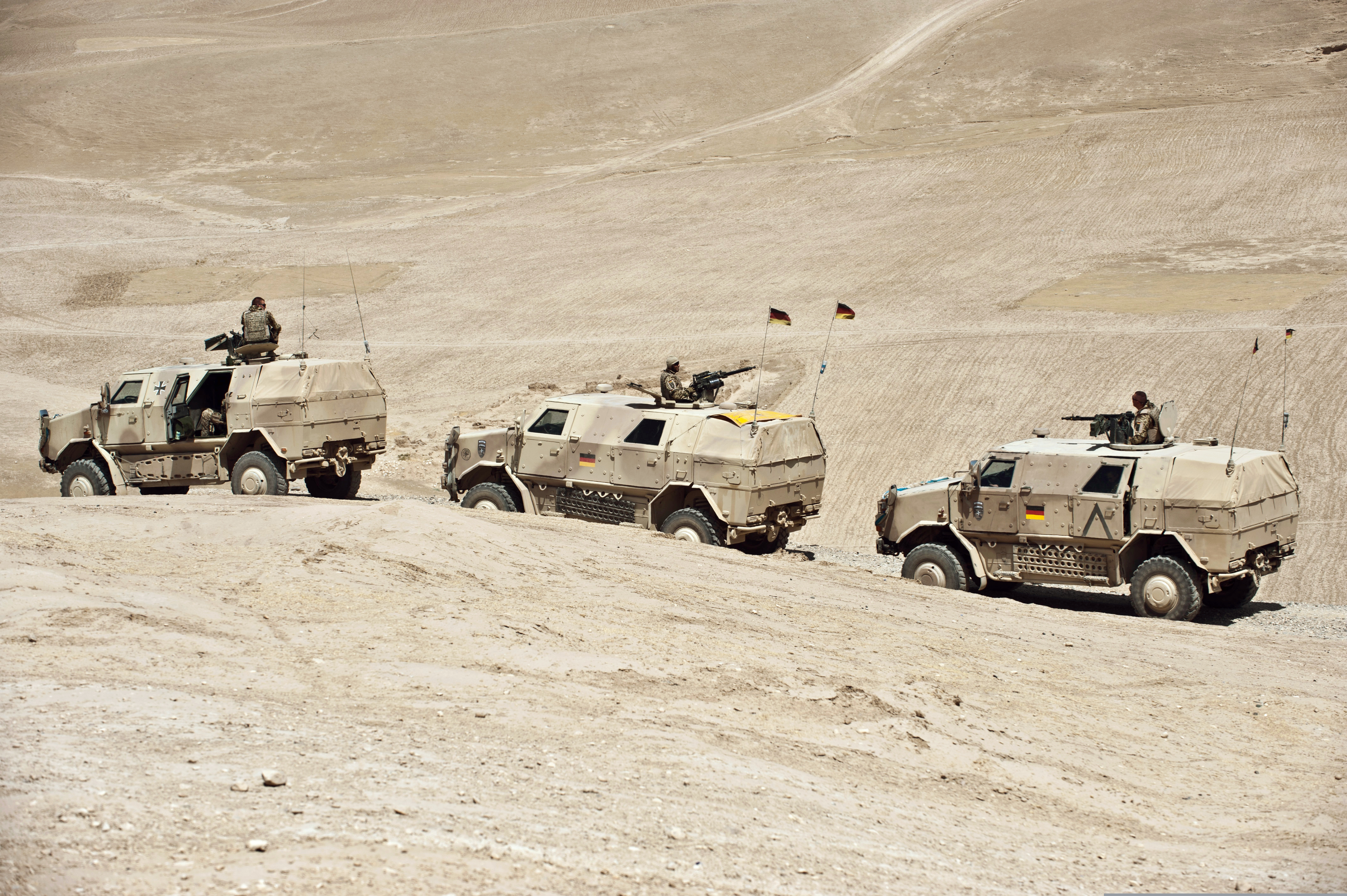
German ATF Dingo equipped with HRM-7000 in Afghanistan 2011

The communications systems of the German armed forces (Bundeswehr) include the strategic communication, information systems for the command and control of combined arms forces. It also covers military intelligence, weather forecasting, and aviation of all branches of the German armed forces.

For communication, SIGNIT, Electronic Warfare and ELOCAT, Bundeswehr using wired and fiber optic systems, fixed and mobile radio stations and satellite communications. While wired and satellite communication paths are operated using digital methods, HF radio communication is still partly analogue and susceptible to eavesdropping. The Bundeswehr's radio communications technology, which has been outdated for years, is a major problem when working with NATO partners.

== History ==
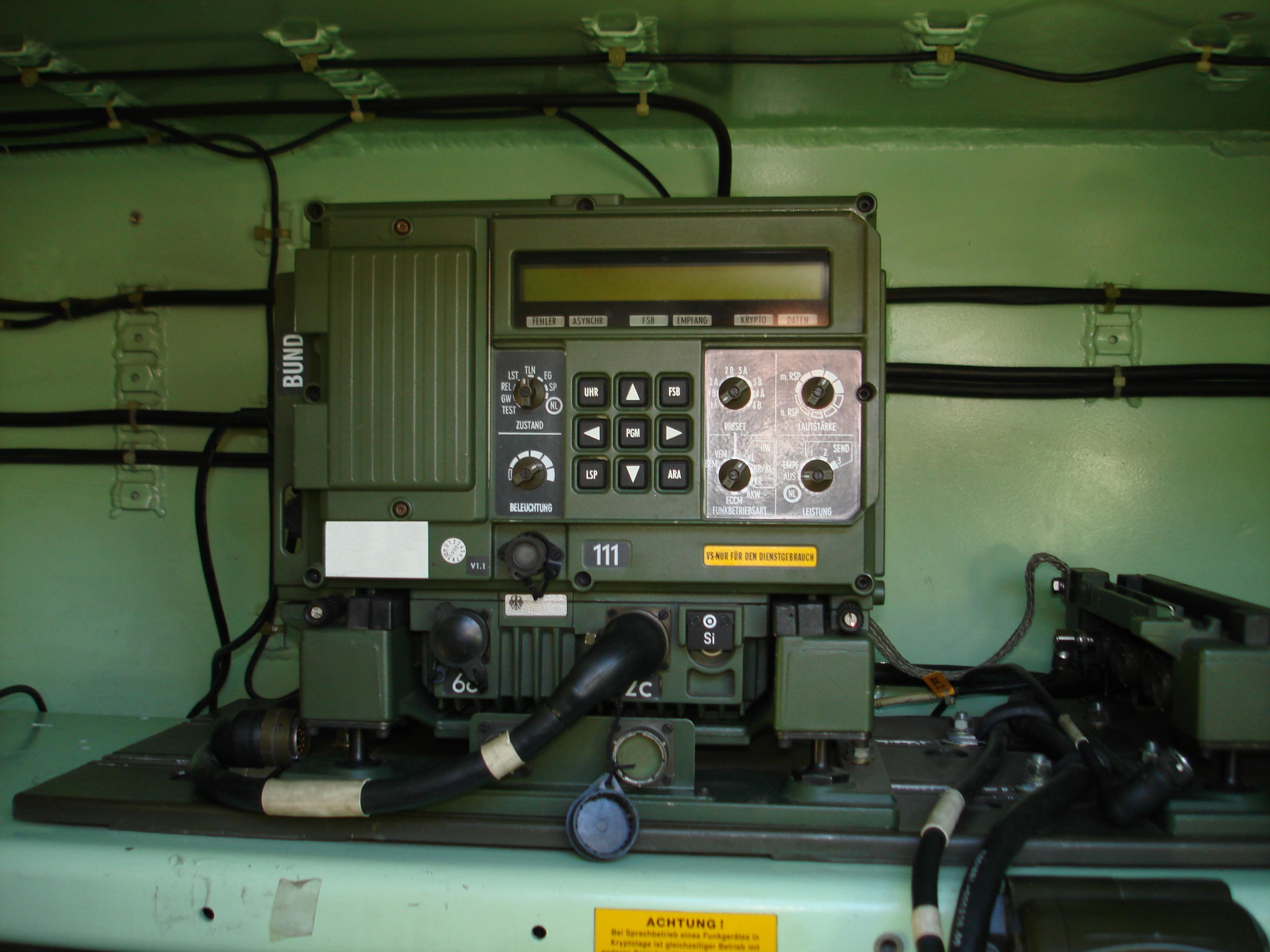
Analog Thales SEM 93 Radio System at a Radio-Vehicle of Bundeswehr

The Bundeswehr has used a number of different means of communication since it was founded. Some of the first wireless systems were bought from the US-army. The wired field telephone systems initially used was important in the 1960this and 1970this. It is not used anymore today

In the 2000s, a reorientation of communications technology became clear due to the end of the Cold War and the increase in foreign deployments. The fact that the communication technology is inconsistent and partly outdated became particularly clear during the foreign assignments. Die Zeit wrote in 2018 that when a "paratrooper and his unit wanted to leave the German camp in Kunduz for a patrol, he had more communication electronics than weapons with him."

German Defence Ministry launched a project for a Joint, interconnected radio equipment for the armed forces ("Streitkräftegemeinsame verbundfähige Funkausstattung (SVFuA)"). As part of the SVFuA project, since 2008 to 2016 the Communication Systems Departement of University of the Bundeswehr in Munich developed concepts for the future network and security management system in collaboration with the BSI and the BAAINBw.

In the mid-2010s, the Ministry of Defense launched the "Mobile Tactical Communications" (MoTaKo) project to modernize the communication devices for large numbers of troops. New radios were to be developed, built and purchased for 25,000 vehicles and 50,000 soldiers. MoTaKo is one of the Federal Ministry of Defence largest armaments projects of this decade. A total of 5.5 billion euros is planned.

In addition to the police, fire brigade and rescue services, the Bundeswehr also used the digital trunked radio of the so-called "authorities and organizations with security tasks" (BOS) from 2019. The Bundestag passed a corresponding amendment to the law in April 2019. Individual branches of the Bundeswehr were already participants in BOS radio. With the integration into the existing BOS radio, the Bundeswehr saves money for setting up its own radio infrastructure; The federal government will bear the additional annual costs of 8.3 million euros for the Bundeswehr's national BOS radio.

In 2021 Spiegel reported, that the Federal Office for Defense Technology and Procurement (BWB) was having radios from the 1980s replicated for 600 million Euros.Because new devices are not yet ready for use, the Bundeswehr has let the standard radio set of the army, the Thales SEM 80/90 rebuilt again. The radios are still installed in most of Bundeswehr vehicles. The radio was actually developed by the Stuttgart company Standard Elektrik Lorenz AG, which taken over by Thales.

=== Capacity building up from 2022 ===
The German armed forces radio communications technology, which has been outdated in large parts since the 1990this is a major problem when working with NATO partners. The transmission procedures used Bundeswehr-internally, which do not comply with the current NATO digital standards, led to major difficulties during maneuvers and joint missions abroad. The impractical radio technology causes problems not only for the army but also for logistics of the Joint Support Service (Streitkräftebasis) and the Joint medical service (Sanitätsdienst).

When the Russian war of aggression on Ukraine started in 2022, the German government under Chancellor Olaf Scholz (SPD) decided on a special assets ("Sondervermögen") for fitting of German armed forces worth 100 billion euros.

One of the major investments is the fasten digitalization of command and information systems of Bundeswehr. The Digitization of Land-Based Operations program (Digitalisierung Landbasierter Operationen (DLBO)) aims to procure a uniform digital and encrypted communications system for the land forces. The long-standing German manufacturer Rohde & Schwarz was awarded the contract for5 billion EUR in 2022 for Armed Forces Joint Connected Radio Equipment (Streitkräftegemeinsame verbundfähige Funkausstattung (SVFuA)) executed by his Soveron System. The order was placed directly. The competitor, the French Thales Group, is taking legal action against the decision because the tender was incorrect.

R&S will deliver its Soveron program of SDRs for HF, UHF and VHF spectrums. The system is based on an internationally common Software Communications Architecture standard with backward compatibility. R&S Soveron is already used by a number of NATO and non-NATO forces.

In September 2023 it became known that the Bundeswehr was having problems equipping its up to 34,000 vehicles with the SOVERON devices because the necessary mechanical adapter plates were missing and in some cases the vehicles' alternators did not provide enough power.

The first to be equipped was the German NATO Very High Readiness Joint Task Force (VJTF) Land. Two Panzergrenadier battalions and their Pumas were equipped.

== Organisation ==
Head of all information-technology and electronic reconnaissance is the Command Cyber and Information Domain Service.

Most of the signal corps (German: Fernmelder) of Bundeswehr are part of the information-technology command of Bundeswehr (Kommando Informationstechnik der Bundeswehr) in the organizational area of "Cyber and Information Domain Service". Around 7.200 soldiers serv in the signal corps.

=== Army ===
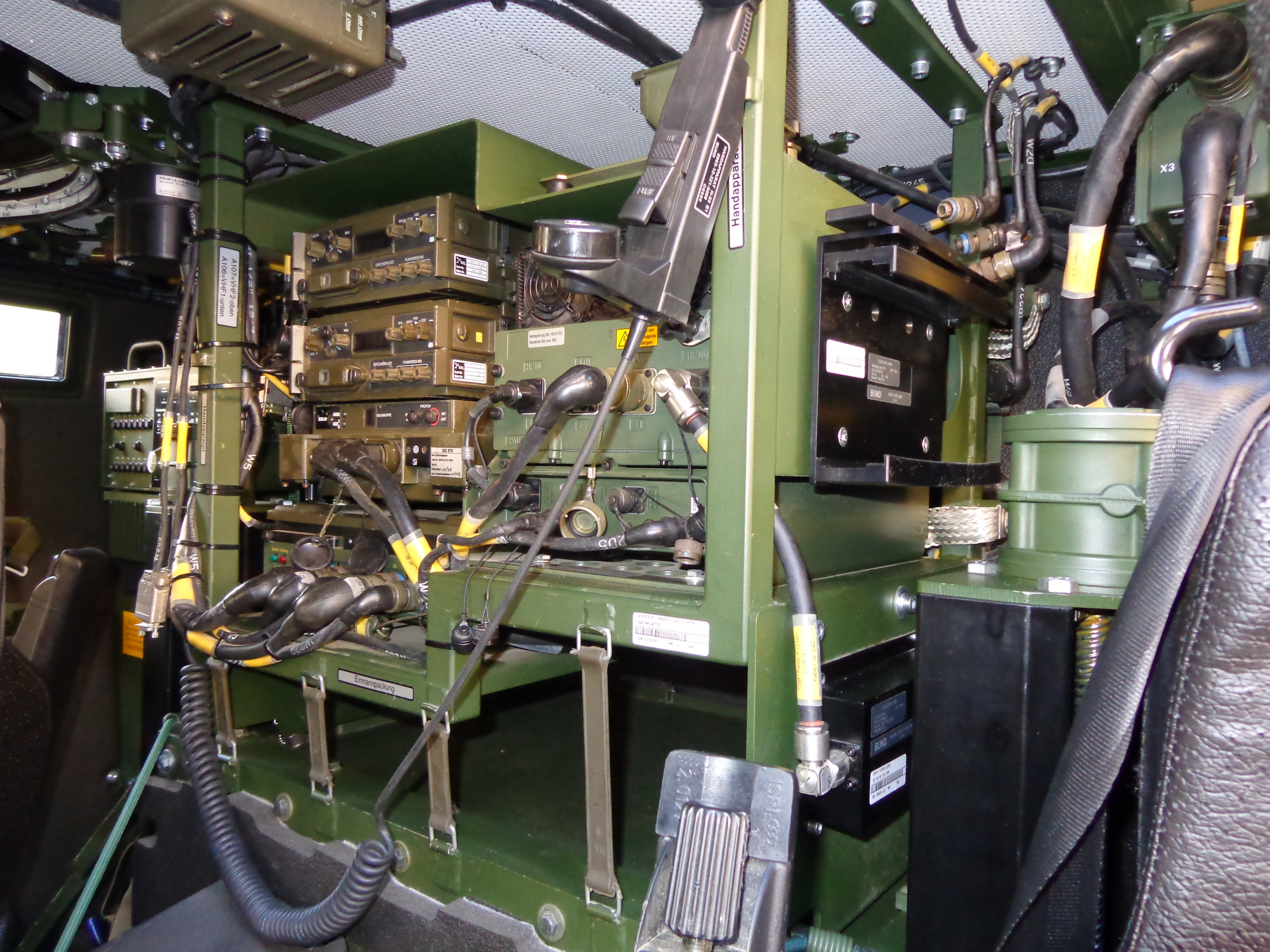
Fennek of Bundeswehr with an SE system

Some of the signal corps (German: Fernmelder) are a branch in the German army. Besides this, every Company has its own signal corps specialist within its unit. For long-distance communications for deployments abroad, the HRM-7000 shortwave radio system is often used.

R&S SOVERON Handheld and Vehicle application have already been commissioned to equip he German element of Very High Joint Readiness Task Force 2023 (VJTF 2023), with key elements Puma infantry fighting vehicles and future dismounted soldier.

=== Airforce ===
German Air Force (Luftwaffe) has its own signal corps specialist within its units. Beside analog Airband-radios they use the MR6000A SDR from Rohde & Schwarz in Eurofighter and helicopters (Tiger, MH90 and others).

=== Navy ===
The German Navy has its own signal corps specialist within its units and at the ships. For on-board communication the Navy will use TETRA standard VHF-radios by Motorola up from 2022. TETRA is also used by German civil rescue and law enforcement agencies.

== Tactical networks ==
- Autoko
- Link 16 (NATO)
- Tetra / Tetrapol (VHF based Trans-European Trunked Radio standard)
- VANBw

== Systems and equipment ==
=== HF communication ===
Frequencies	HF (1-30 MHz)
Optical/electronical connectivity / capacity	10 kBit
Encryption	SITLink (Rhode & Schwarz)
Deployment	Bundeswehr operations abroad

The Bundeswehr is using different HF-radio systems. Elbit System HRM-7000, SEM 93 and the SDR radio MR6000A from Rohde & Schwarz, which is available in all branches of the armed forces.

Bundeswehr is using the HRM-7000 transceiver of Telefunken / Elbit Systems at deployments abroad. The succedor is HRM-9000. In February 2022 the Bundeswehr (BAAINBw) decided to buy more HRM 7X00 transceivers and the fitting Kryptomodul TCU 7000E for different platforms.

=== UHF / VHF systems ===
The main System of Bundeswehr is the SEM 80/90 analog UHF radio, introduced in the early 80this and rebuild in 2021.

At the Afghanistan ISAF deployment of Bundeswehr, platoons often used the US AN/PRC-117. It is a universally-used software defined radio of US Harris Corporation widely used by the US army. It is used for Phone, tactical short messages and data transceiving a wide frequency range. It can also be used to communicate via US military satellites used as relays. The AN/PRC-117G has built-in cryptographic technology that enables message transmission at all NATO levels of secrecy. With the help of a military “Global Positioning System” (GPS), precise location determination is possible.The radio is used, among other things, in the Very High Readiness Joint Task Force (VJTF), where interoperability between NATO units is particularly important.
In 2020 Bundeswehr ordered 370 units worth US$30 million. From 2021 until 2024, it planned to order more so that there is a number of 913 radios, worth 91 million euros.

Within the SVFuA program Bundeswehr will use R&S Soveron VHF/UHF SDRs. The radios could transmit and receive simultaneous voice and IP data. The radios are used in the handheld version and the vehicular radio version (SDTR/SOVERON VR).

=== Satellite communication ===
Frequencies	Ku band C band
Optical/electronical connectivity / capacity	2 Mbit/s / per channel (3 channels)
Encryption	SITLink (Rhode & Schwarz)
Deployment	Bundeswehr operations abroad

SATCOMBw is the Bundeswehr's satellite-based communications system. The system, operated by Airbus Defense and Space, enables the military to make tap-proof telephone calls, video conferences and Internet access worldwide. In the current "Stage 2", which has been in operation since the end of 2011, the system is based on the two communications satellites COMSATBw-1 and 2 with which the ground stations of Bundeswehr and the German Aerospace Center (DLR) is linked. The system has a capacity of 3 × 2 Mbit/s Duplex encrypted.

=== Mobile Terrestical Data Communication TÜtrSys ===
Frequencies	L band (1.35 – 2.69 GHz) SHF (4.4 – 5 GHz)
Optical/electronical connectivity / capacity	Ethernet 100 Mbit/s
Encryption	SITLine ETH 50 (Rhode & Schwarz)
Deployment	Bundeswehr operations abroad and homeland

The "Terrestrial Transmission System" (TÜtrSys) is used for data connections between network nodes in the field. The system enables the simultaneous operation of up to three directional radio links.

=== Radio equipment ===
In the 1980s, SEM radios are introduced. SEM means "Sende-Empfänger", German for transceiver.

- SEM 52 SL analog Handhold (introduced in 1995)
- SEM 80/90 analog radio, introduced in the early 80this and rebuild in 2021
- SEM 93E radio for vehicles from Thales (introduced since August 2001)
- HRM-7000 shortwave-radio from Telefunken RACOMS, now Elbit Systems (introduced 1997, 2007 extended by „HRM 7000 Manpack“)
- MR6000A SDR from Rohde & Schwarz (since 2010 in Eurofighter and helicopters)
- PRC-117 from Harris Corporation
- Satcom MK is the satellite-communication System: a 4,6-m-Offset-Antenna on a trailer.
- E-LynX digital military radio equipment from Telefunken Radio Communication Systems GmbH & Co. KG, the German subsidiary of the Israeli Elbit Group. Used at a little number in the Army the in a portable and vehicle version at troop, group, platoon and company level, as well as on board various combat vehicles such as the SPz PUMA.
