= HRM-7000 =

German military shortwave transceiver

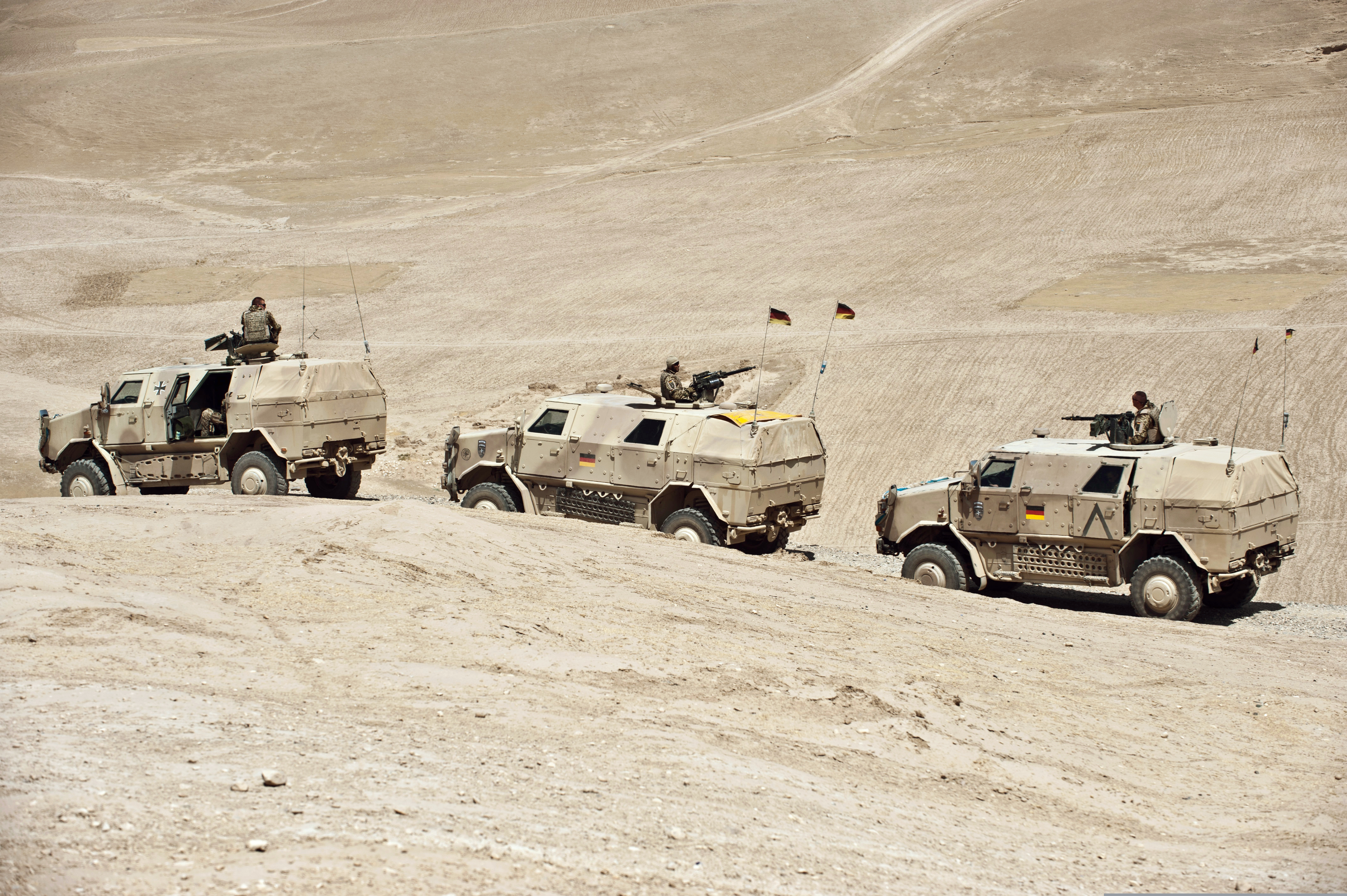
German ATF Dingo equipped with HRM-7000 in Afghanistan 2011

HRM-7000 is a German military shortwave-transceiver of Elbit Systems, formerly Telefunken Racom. It is one of the Communication systems of the German Bundeswehr.

The successor is the HRM-9000 system, also for global voice and data communication in deployments abroad. The Bundeswehr is evaluating the HRM-9000 system (2022), but several NATO forces already use HRM-9000 tactical shortwave transceiver.

HRM-7000
Technical data
Frequency range	2–29,999 MHz
Frequency steps	1 kHz
Transmitter power output	30 W PEP
Waveforms (Modulations)	C1B transmittuing J2B Receiving
modulation rate	2000 Baud transmititting, 75 Baud receiving
Power input	Receiver only 200 mA, Transmitter 8 A max.
Operating voltage	13–20 V, Nominal voltage 14,4 V
Size and weight
High	70 mm
Width	365 mm
Depth	290 mm
Weight	ca. 7 kg
Further information
Producer	Telefunken, now Elbit Systems
Scope of application	Bundeswehr (reconnaissance units, KSK)

== History ==
The System is the successor of the "FS-5000M" Transceiver. Telefunken developed HRM-7000 since 1994 and it is service at Bundeswehr since 1997. The „HRM 7000 Manpack“ is specified for mobile use in combat situations. It is used in deployments abroad i.e. at KFOR. Because of its reliability and lightweight it is used by the Kommando Spezialkräfte and Quick Reaction Forces / European Union Battlegroups.

Bundeswehr is evaluating the succedor HRM-9000 system (2022), but several NATO forces already using HRM-9000 tactical shortwave transceiver. According to military analysts, the Russian invasion of Ukraine showed the Electronic warfare capabilities of Russian forces. Because of that, the tactical shortwave communication as redundant and reliable system to satellit communication gained more interest again.

In February 2022 the Bundeswehr (BAAINBw) decided to buy more HRM 7X00 transceivers and the fitting Kryptomodul TCU 7000E for different platforms.

== Technology ==
The HRM-7000 system is a family of shortwave radios. The devices are designed to ensure fast connection setup worldwide and can handle both voice and data transmission. The HRM-7000 uses Automatic Link Establishment (ALE) to search for suitable connection frequencies and is therefore not susceptible to fluctuating ionospheric conditions and targeted interference.

The portable variant HRM 7000 has an output power of 30 Watt, which can be sufficient for worldwide data communication. The vehicle version HRM 7400M, has an output power of 400 W due to the higher battery capacity. Different operating modes are possible with the system. This includes encrypted data and telephony. A connection can be established conventionally or with Automatic Link Establishment (ALE). The system automatically adjusts the transmission power in a range from 3 W to 30 W. For data communication the fitting Kryptomodul TCU 7000E is used.

For a more universal and space-saving use, the antenna adapter is available separately. The terminal of the transceiver can also be operated remotely. The complete data transmission, operation and programming takes place from the PC, laptop, PDA (also wireless) via a standard interface. RACOM has had the system certified according to MIL-STD-810 E and VG 95332.

== HRM-9000 ==
Elbit System presented around 2020 the HRM-9000 as a fully compatible successor of HRM-7000. The system consists of the same devices (Manpack, vehicle version, base station). The main feature of the mainly software defined radio (SDR) system is the extended frequency range from HF to VHF up to 50 MHz. The systems supports multi-channel operation and transceiver operation with a range of antennas. Included features are the preparation for integration into C4I systems, Blue-Force-Tracking (integrated GPS receiver and connection for external GPS) and wideband HF with up to 240 kbp at 48 kHz adaptive channel bandwidth. Via a "tactical router" HRM-9000 can be connected to the Elbit E-Lynx System. The system is suitable for high rate data and video transmissions (MIL-STD-188-110, STANAG 4203).
