= Citizens Broadband Radio Service =

US broadcast band

Citizens Broadband Radio Service (CBRS) is a 150 MHz wide broadcast band of the 3.5 GHz band (3550 MHz to 3700 MHz) in the United States. In 2017, the US Federal Communications Commission (FCC) completed a process which began in 2012 to establish rules for commercial use of this band, while reserving parts of the band for the US Federal Government to limit interference with US Navy radar systems and aircraft communications.

On January 27, 2020, the FCC authorized full use of the CBRS band for wireless service provider commercialization without the restrictions to prevent interference with military use of the spectrum. Under the new rules, wireless carriers using CBRS might be able to deploy 5G mobile networks without having to acquire spectrum licenses. Key use cases for CBRS network deployments include Fixed Wireless Access (FWA), mobile network densification, neutral host infrastructure and private networks.

== History ==
The creation of a new publicly available transmission band in the 3.5 GHz band was identified as a possibility by the US National Telecommunications and Information Administration (NTIA) for shared federal and non-federal use in its 2010 Fast Track Report. This band was identified as the Citizens Broadband Radio Service in a Notice of Proposed Rulemaking released by the FCC in December 2012, which the FCC found would "promote two major advances that enable more efficient use of radio spectrum: small cells and spectrum sharing". The record was thereafter supplemented by a commission-level public notice and two workshops to discuss technical issues related to the proposed Service. In April 2014, the commission released a Further Notice of Proposed Rulemaking that included detailed proposed rules to govern the new service.

== Operation ==
The Citizens Broadband Radio Service is governed by a three-tiered spectrum authorization framework to accommodate a variety of commercial uses on a shared basis with incumbent federal and non-federal users of the band in the US. Access and operations will be managed by a dynamic spectrum access system, conceptually similar to the databases used to manage Television White Spaces devices. The three tiers are: Incumbent Access, Priority Access, and General Authorized Access.

- Incumbent Access users, particular the US Navy operators, will be protected from harmful interference from Priority Access and General Authorized Access users.
  - Authorized federal users in the 3.550–3.700 GHz band, which mostly clusters around the coast and includes US Navy radar operators.
  - Authorized grandfathered fixed satellite service users in the 3.600–3.700 GHz band.
  - Authorized 3650–3700 MHz band broadband service per Part 90. They "are grandfathered for up to 5 years", with the FCC's Wireless Telecommunications Bureau and Office of Engineering and Technology charged with soliciting public comment on "the appropriate methodology for defining the grandfathered wireless protection zone contours".
- The Priority Access tier consists of Priority Access Licenses (PALs) that will be assigned using competitive bidding within the 3550-3650 MHz portion of the band. Each PAL is defined as a non-renewable authorization to use a 10 megahertz channel in a single census tract for three years. Up to seven total PALs may be assigned in any given census tract with up to four PALs going to any single applicant. Applicants may acquire up to two consecutive PAL terms in any given license area during the first auction.
- The General Authorized Access (GAA) tier is licensed-by-rule to permit open, flexible access to the band for the widest possible group of potential users. General Authorized Access users are permitted to use any portion of the 3550-3700 MHz band not assigned to a higher tier user and may also operate opportunistically on unused Priority Access channels.

Use of the CBRS band will not require spectrum license, and it has been asserted that they will reduce the cost of data transmissions. However, users will be required to pay their Spectrum Access System (SAS) a "reasonable" fee for access, even when only using GAA channels. This will enable carriers "to deploy 5G faster and easier, using the shared airwaves instead of trying to acquire spectrum licenses at auction or through deals". Since these frequencies have historically been used for government purposes, users of the CBRS band will be required to "take care not to interfere with others already using nearby airwave bands in some locations, including military radar stations and satellite receiver stations". As with Wi-Fi, CBRS equipment will be deployed to individual building owners, and those owners, or end users occupying the property, would pay a fee for spectrum allocation through a server.

== CBRS standards ==
In 2015, the members of the Wireless Innovation Forum (WInnForum) formed the Spectrum Sharing Committee to "facilitate the interpretation and implementation of FCC rulemaking to a level that allows industry and government to collaborate on the implementation of a common, well functioning ecosystem...". Through this committee some 300 engineers from over 60 organizations developed the 10 baseline standards necessary for CBRS deployment. These standards covered requirements, security, protocols, professional installation, priority access licensing, and testing.

Recognizing that the development of the standards alone was not sufficient to fully support a commercial ecosystem, the members of the WInnForum went on to establish a number of certification programs:

- An accreditation program for public key infrastructure (PKI), root of trust (RoT) and certificate authorities (CA) supporting the CBRS Communications Security Standard and the PKI Certificate Policy.
- An accreditation program for Certified Professional Installer (CPI) trainers following the CPI standard.
- A program to authorize test labs to perform CBSD (Citizens Broadband Radio Service Device) protocol testing following the WInnForum CBSD Test Standard.

This last program was developed in coordination with the FCC: in order to be FCC certified to operate in the CBRS band, an equipment manufacturer needs to show that their CBSD can communicate with a Spectrum Access System (SAS) and follow its directives as per 47 CFR Part 96. The CBRS ecosystem has developed standards in the WInnForum supporting SAS to CBSD communication (WINNF-TS-0016), and in addition, the WInnForum CBRS Test and Certification Task Group has developed a test specification (WINNF-TS-0122) and test harness supporting that standard. The FCC has determined that successful completion of the Wireless Innovation Forum defined tests will provide evidence of Part 96 compliance in this area. Final test code for CBSD protocol testing was released by the Wireless Innovation Forum on 24 May 2018, and since that time over 30 CBSDs have been certified and received their FCC ID, proving compliance with WInnForum specifications.

The members of the WInnForum also worked to facilitate SAS certification testing, developing an open source SAS test harness to assess compliance with the WInnForum SAS test specification (WINNF-TS-0065) and the FCC rules. This test harness was turned over to the NTIA Institute for Telecommunications Sciences on May 26, 2018 and testing began on the SAS implementations provided by Amdocs, CommScope, Google, Federated Wireless and Sony. This testing was completed in June 2019, and marked the last major milestone necessary for the FCC to allow initial commercial deployment.

=== Radio users ===
Only digital radio protocols may be used over CBRS.

CBRS includes the old broadband range used by 802.11y, but the 802.11 workgroup has actively disavowed interest in CBRS.

CBRS partially overlaps the 3GPP Bands 42 & 43 (3400-3600/3600-3800 TD-LTE). The 3GPP has created Band 48 specifically for TD-LTE in the entire CBRS range and Band 49 for LAA in the entire CBRS range.

== OnGo Alliance (Previously CBRS Alliance) ==
In 2016, six companies interested in promoting CBRS technology and driving adoption formed the CBRS Alliance. As of mid-2017, the CBRS Alliance listed over 60 members, including Alphabet (Google) AT&T, Charter Communications, Cisco Systems, Comcast, the CTIA, Ericsson, Federated Wireless, Intel, Nokia, Qualcomm, Ruckus Wireless (now part of CommScope), and SpiderCloud Wireless.

In January 2021, the organization rebranded as the "OnGo Alliance" in order to address spectrum sharing concerns beyond only those in the CBRS band in the United States.

== Expected impact ==
Bloomberg Technology has described CBRS as potentially being "[m]ore reliable than Wi-Fi" and "technology that risks making Wi-Fi outmoded", and quotes CBRS Alliance president Michael Peeters characterizing CBRS as possibly "a better option for factories, airports and ports". Network World has noted that it is "quite likely that the band will be used for 5G, and that might synch nicely with services offered in other countries that are actually targeting the band for 5G services". It is further proposed that such a 5G network "promises to let consumers download a high-definition movie in less than a second".

== Early trials ==
The first trials were conducted in Finland in 2016 in collaboration between Nokia, VTT and other Finnish organizations. Beginning in 2017, a number of CBRS trial projects were initiated in various cities in the US. In February 2017, Nokia, Alphabet and Qualcomm tested LTE technology in a CBRS-band broadcast of "live high-definition video of cars racing on a track in Las Vegas". In April, Kansas City, Missouri "approved a Google test of 3.5 GHz shared wireless in more than eight locations in that area for up to 18 months". In May, Google received permission from the FCC to test wireless technology within the CBRS band at four NASCAR race events held during the summer of 2017, in Bristol, Tennessee, Brooklyn, Michigan, Darlington, South Carolina, and Richmond, Virginia. By August 2017, Verizon Communications had formed a consortium "to carry out the first use of CBRS band 48 spectrum in a 4G LTE Advanced (LTE-A) carrier aggregation demonstration". In November 2017, the CBRS Alliance entered into an agreement with the Wireless Internet Service Providers Association (WISPA) "to cooperate closely in the advancement of the CBRS spectrum band".

== Deployments ==
In January 2019 the Global Mobile Suppliers Association reported that there were 11 companies investing in CBRS trials in the US, including AT&T Mobility, Boingo Wireless, Charter Communications, Comcast, Google, Midcontinent Communications, T-Mobile US, US Cellular, Verizon Wireless and Windstream.

Mobile Country Code 315 and Mobile Network Code 010 have been assigned for IMSIs in CBRS systems in the US. The LTE frequency band for CBRS in the US is referred to as band 48 in the 3GPP standards.

In March 2019, Motorola Solutions launched Mototrbo Nitro, the first fully managed CBRS platform and product offerings. Mototrbo Nitro is a line of business-critical, CBRS communications and data products, which includes the first purpose-built OnGo portable radio. Deployment of Mototrbo Nitro infrastructure allows for services such as Nitro Cloud management, and is inter-operable with existing Mototrbo networks.

In 2021, DISH Network announced its customers would be able to set up 5G network hotspots using FreedomFi gateways and CBRS, with "rewards" paid in cryptocurrency.

In 2022, California State University, Stanislaus, deployed a campus-wide 5G private local area network on CBRS.

In May 2022, Federated Wireless deployed a private wireless network on CBRS to automate agricultural solutions as part of a joint industry collaboration with Blue White Robotics and Intel.

== Attribution ==
This article incorporates some material from the US Federal Communications Commission report, 3.5 GHz Band / Citizens Broadband Radio Service, accessed August 30, 2017, a source in the public domain.
