= Hameg =

HAMEG Instruments GmbH
- Founded: 1957 in Frankfurt, Germany
- Founder: Karl Hartmann
- Headquarters: Mainhausen, Germany
- Products: Test & Measurement Equipment
- Website: hameg.com at the Wayback Machine (archived 2010-06-10)

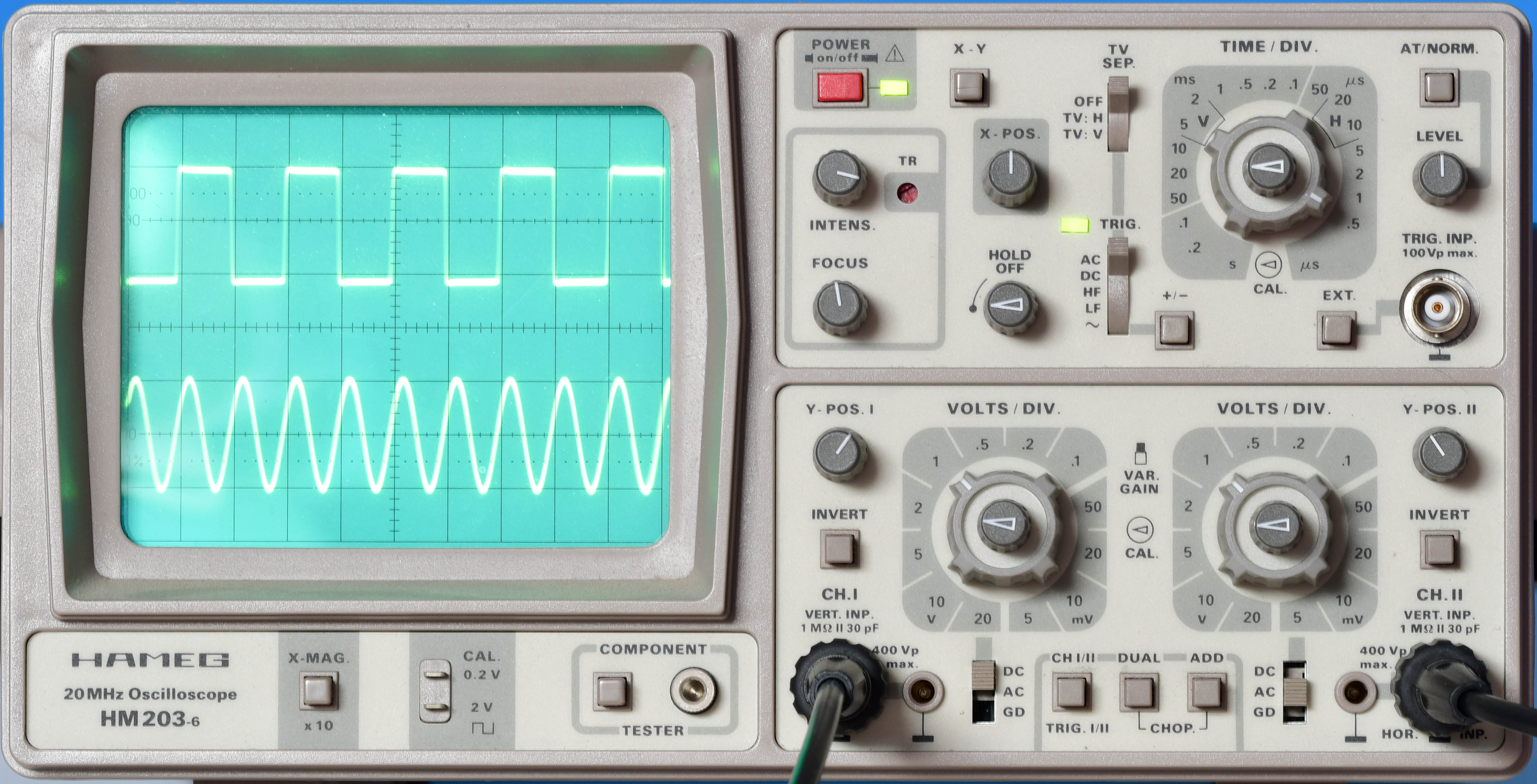

HAMEG Instruments GmbH was a German enterprise specialized in the development and production of laboratory instruments (such as oscilloscopes). The company was located in Mainhausen near Frankfurt, Germany until it was completely integrated in the test & measurement division of Rohde & Schwarz in 2016. As a result, HAMEG as an independent company was closed.

== History ==
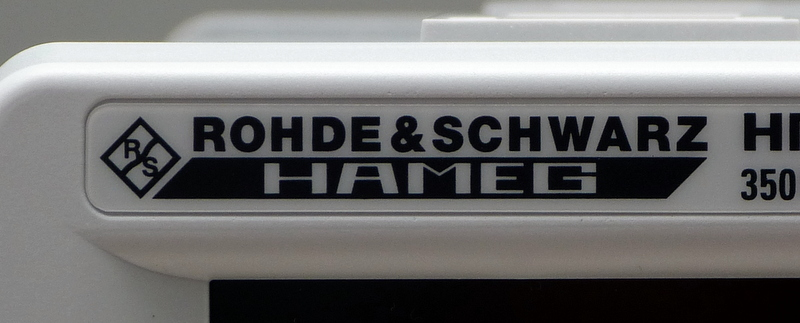
HAMEG product logo since 2012

The business was established in 1957 by Karl Hartmann in Frankfurt/Main under the name HAMEG KG. The company name is derived from Hartmann-Messgeräte. The first product was a 5 MHz one channel oscilloscope. In 2005, the company founder retired and the business was acquired by the electronics company Rohde & Schwarz with headquarters in Munich. During that time, the name was changed to HAMEG Instruments GmbH. HAMEG maintained subsidiaries in Chemnitz (product development) and Münchenbernsdorf (PCB assembly) as well as a distribution subsidiary in France (HAMEG Instruments France S.a.r.l.). At the end of 2010, HAMEG abandoned the manufacturing locations Mainhausen and Münchenbernsdorf and since then has moved production to the Rohde & Schwarz plant at Vimperk in the Czech Republic. In the wake of this transition, approximately 80 jobs were cut at HAMEG. Other company divisions such as development (Mainhausen and Chemnitz), product management, sales, customer service and quality assurance have remained independent.

At the end of 2011, Rohde & Schwarz announced that the company would offer the entire HAMEG product portfolio through its own European distribution network. Only a few months later, in February 2012, HAMEG launched a new product logo. This was the first time that the HAMEG affiliation with Rohde & Schwarz became visible on HAMEG products thanks to the dual name label. As of March 2013, HAMEG products have been made available virtually all over the world through the Rohde & Schwarz distribution network. In June 2014 Rohde & Schwarz announced that in the future all new products from HAMEG will be marketed under the name Rohde & Schwarz.

== Products ==
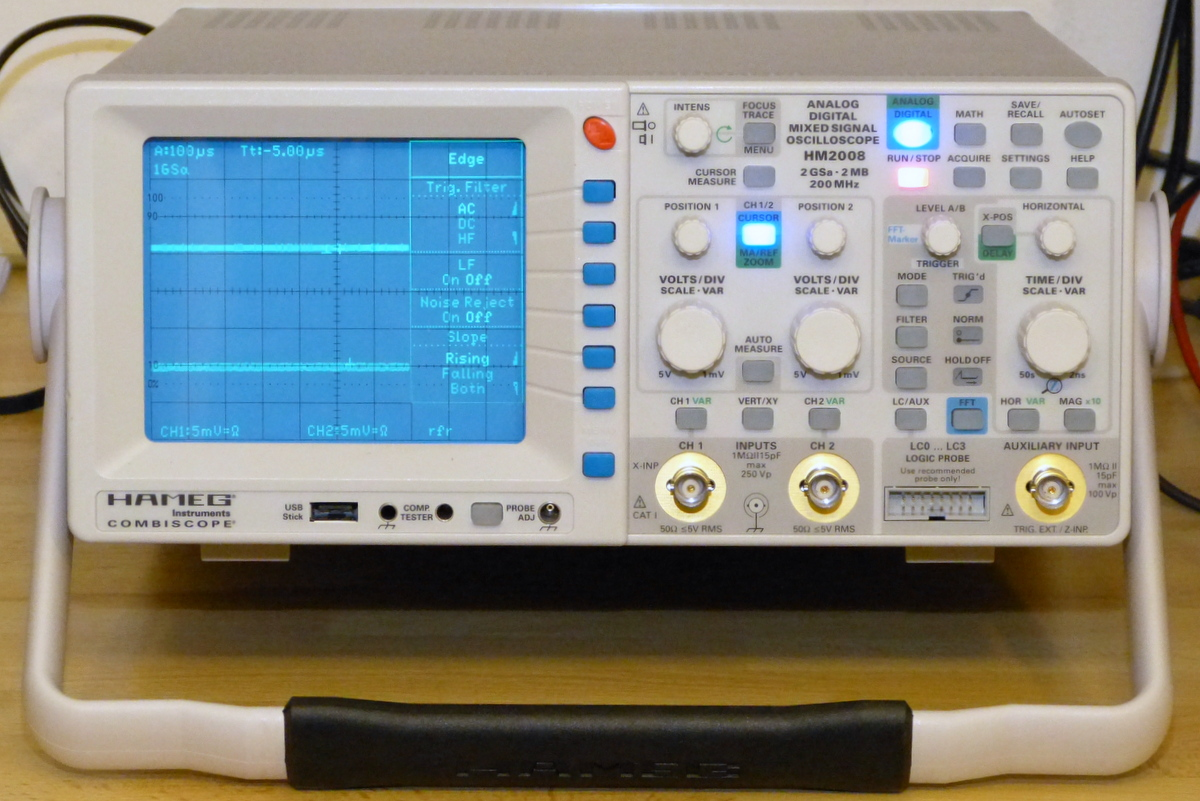
200MHz Mixed Signal CombiScope HM2008

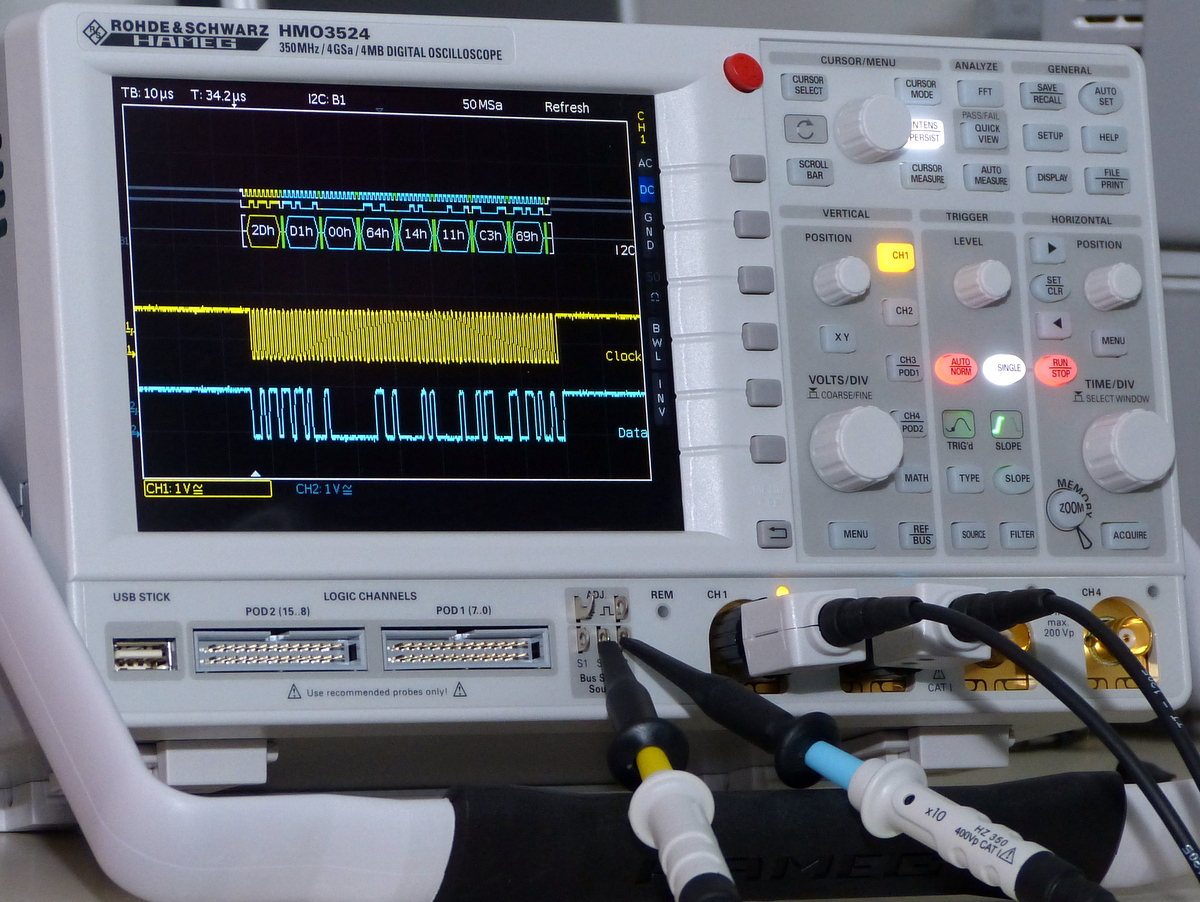
350MHz Mixed Signal Oscilloscope HMO3524

The range of products offered by HAMEG includes analog oscilloscopes, mixed-signal oscilloscopes (MSO), spectrum analyzers, function generators, RF generators, laboratory power supply units, programmable power supplies and modular laboratory measuring components. The company primarily serves the entry-level segment of the market and is particularly used at electronics laboratories, production supervision as well as at schools and universities. For a very long time, HAMEG was convinced of the benefits of analog technology in the context of the oscilloscope market. In 2004, when HAMEG introduced a new series of so-called CombiScopes (instruments which include both an analog and a digital operating mode), the company stated that "DSOs in principle can not replace analog oscilloscopes". In 2007, HAMEG produced the HM2008 oscilloscope (as shown in the picture) which includes an analog and a digital element as well as mixed-signal functions (4 digital channels).

In late 2008, HAMEG introduced the first purely digital oscilloscope with TFT monitor at the electronica electronics trade fair in Munich, Germany. As all subsequently introduced instruments, these oscilloscopes include mixed-signal functions (8 or 16 digital channels) and the option to decode serial buses such as I2C, SPI, CAN and LIN. For instruments with TFT monitors, HAMEG skipped the entire generation of the classical, purely digital storage oscilloscopes (DSO) without MSO functions. By 2012, HAMEG had developed a product range of 11 MSO instruments and one analog oscilloscope. In autumn of 2012, HAMEG announced intentions to soon discontinue production of analog oscilloscopes. Allegedly, this decision was partly due to obstacles in sourcing cathode ray tubes. In February 2013, HAMEG introduced a new series of mixed-signal oscilloscopes with up to 500 MHz bandwidth.
