= Rohde & Schwarz =

German multinational electronics company

Rohde & Schwarz GmbH & Co KG
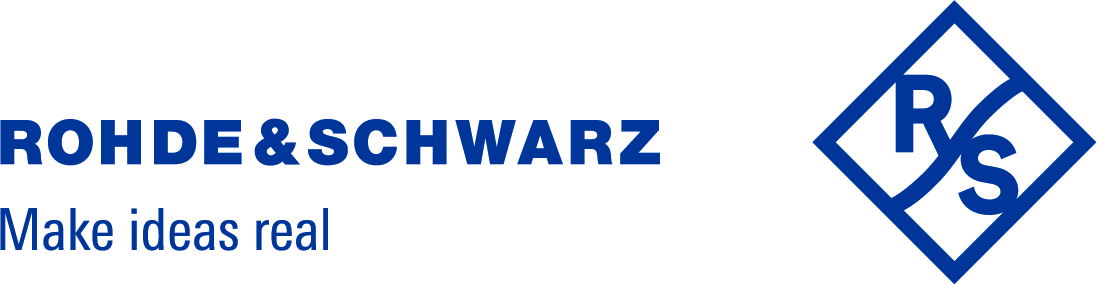
- Type: Private
- Founded: 17 November 1933; 92 years ago
- Founders: Lothar Rohde; Hermann Schwarz
- Headquarters: Munich, Germany
- Key people: Christian Leicher, President & CEO, Markus Fischer, COO, Andreas Pauly, CTO
- Revenue: €3.16 billion (FY 2024/25)
- Number of employees: more than 15,000 (FY 2024/25)
- Website: rohde-schwarz.com

Rohde & Schwarz GmbH & Co. KG (/ˈroʊdə ... ˈʃwɔːrts/ ROH-də ... SHWORTS, German: [ˈʁoːdə ʔʊnt ˈʃvaʁts]) is a German multinational electronics group specializing in the fields of electronic test equipment, broadcast & media, cybersecurity, radiomonitoring and radiolocation, and radiocommunication. The company also provides products for wireless communications, the electronics industry, aerospace and defense, homeland security and critical infrastructures.

In addition to the Munich headquarters, there are regional headquarters in the United States (Columbia, Maryland) and in Asia (Singapore). Worldwide the company has a total of more than 15,000 employees in over 70 countries.

== History ==
=== PTE and World War 2 ===
The company was founded by Lothar Rohde and Hermann Schwarz who met while studying physics in Jena. They built their first T&M instrument in 1932, and in August 1933, the Physikalisch-Technisches Entwicklungslabor Dr. Rohde & Dr. Schwarz (known as PTE) started in business.

Ceramic insulation for frequencies above 1 MHz were improved in the second half of the 1920s when German firm Hermsdorf-Schomburg-Isolatoren-Gesellschaft, also known as Hescho, produced new types of ceramic material with very low loss at radio frequencies, due to the absence of iron. These parts were difficult to measure, but PTE developed suitable test equipment.

In 1934, a British manufacturer of electrical insulation placed an order with them for a similar device. In 1937, the small laboratory moved into a former bakery on Tassiloplatz, not far from Munich's Ostbahnhof. Rohde & Schwarz already employed 35 workers and offered 24 different devices in its catalog at this time. In 1938, it manufactured the first portable quartz clock with a weight of 36 kg.

PTE Started a second factory "Messgerätebau GmbH" in 1941 in Allgäu on the Swiss border. The Wehrmacht's sustained demand for radio equipment manufacturers generated orders and sales as part of the militarization of the Third Reich's Economy. The measurement equipment for HF-technology promoted the development of radar and radio systems of Wehrmacht in WW2.

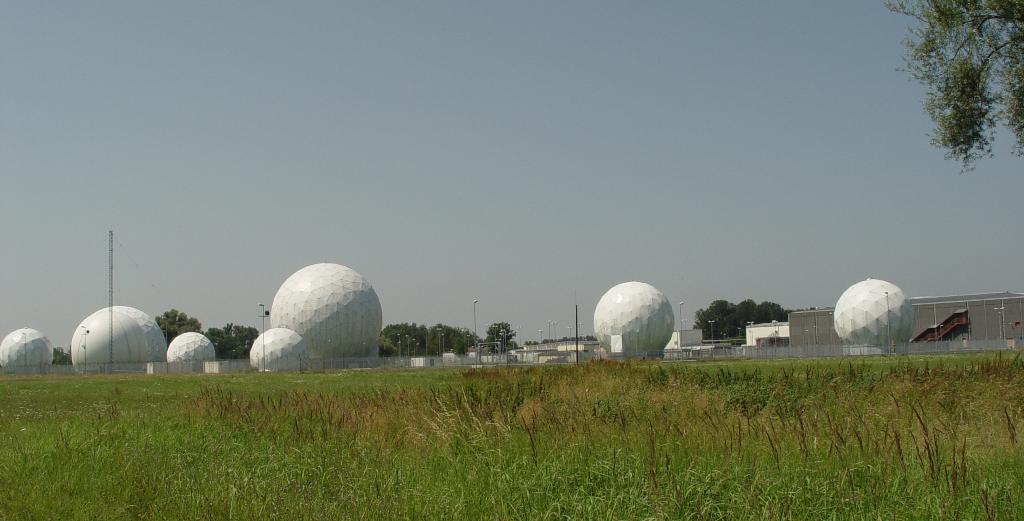
BND / NSA Bad Aibling station, also used as Echelon Field Station 81 equipped with Rohde & Schwarz RF-Sattelit interception technology

=== Internationalisation after 1945 ===
After business activities were resumed in 1945, the US Army placed a major order to equip the then United States Air Force base in Erding that ensured the company's continued existence. In the same year the company was renamed Rohde & Schwarz (R&S).

The company became one of the most important suppliers for radar and reconnaissance companies of the newly founded Bundeswehr. The company also quickly worked closely with the German Federal Intelligence Service, which was founded in 1956.

=== Since 2000 ===
Logo as of 2009

Although the US secret services operated SIGINT reconnaissance stations in cooperation with BND, for example in Bad Aibling, Rohde & Schwarz's communications were also intercepted by NSA. Rohde & Schwarz is or was on an NSA hit list made public by 2010 surveillance disclosures of Edward Snowden.

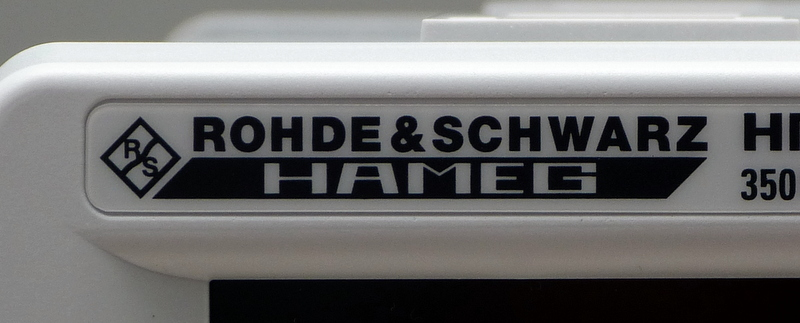
HAMEG scope with dual logo in 2012

In 2012 R&S acquired the traditional German manufacturer for oscilloscope technology HAMEG. In 2016 the company was fully integrated to R&S and the products only branded with "Rohde & Schwarz".

In 2018 a joint venture with Rheinmetall was established: RRS-MITCOS was designed to develop digital solutions for the German Bundeswehr.

In 2022 R&S acquired the Siegburger company Schönhofer Sales and Engineering GmbH, SSE. The company develops analytic systems for IT and integration of AI analytic tools.

In May 2022, Rohde & Schwarz announced the acquisition of UK based technology training and development company The Technology Academy. The technology company specialises in web-based training in the fields of radio frequency, wireless and microwave engineering technology.

R&S has grown from just over 6,500 employees in 2010 to over 13,000 in 2022 and is represented at 70 locations worldwide. This growth was not exclusively organic, but also included company acquisitions such as Lancom - one of the leading manufacturers of network infrastructure.

In 2023, R&S received a comprehensive contract worth several billion to update the communications systems and equip almost all military units in the German Bundeswehr with its SOVERON digital radio system.

== Products ==
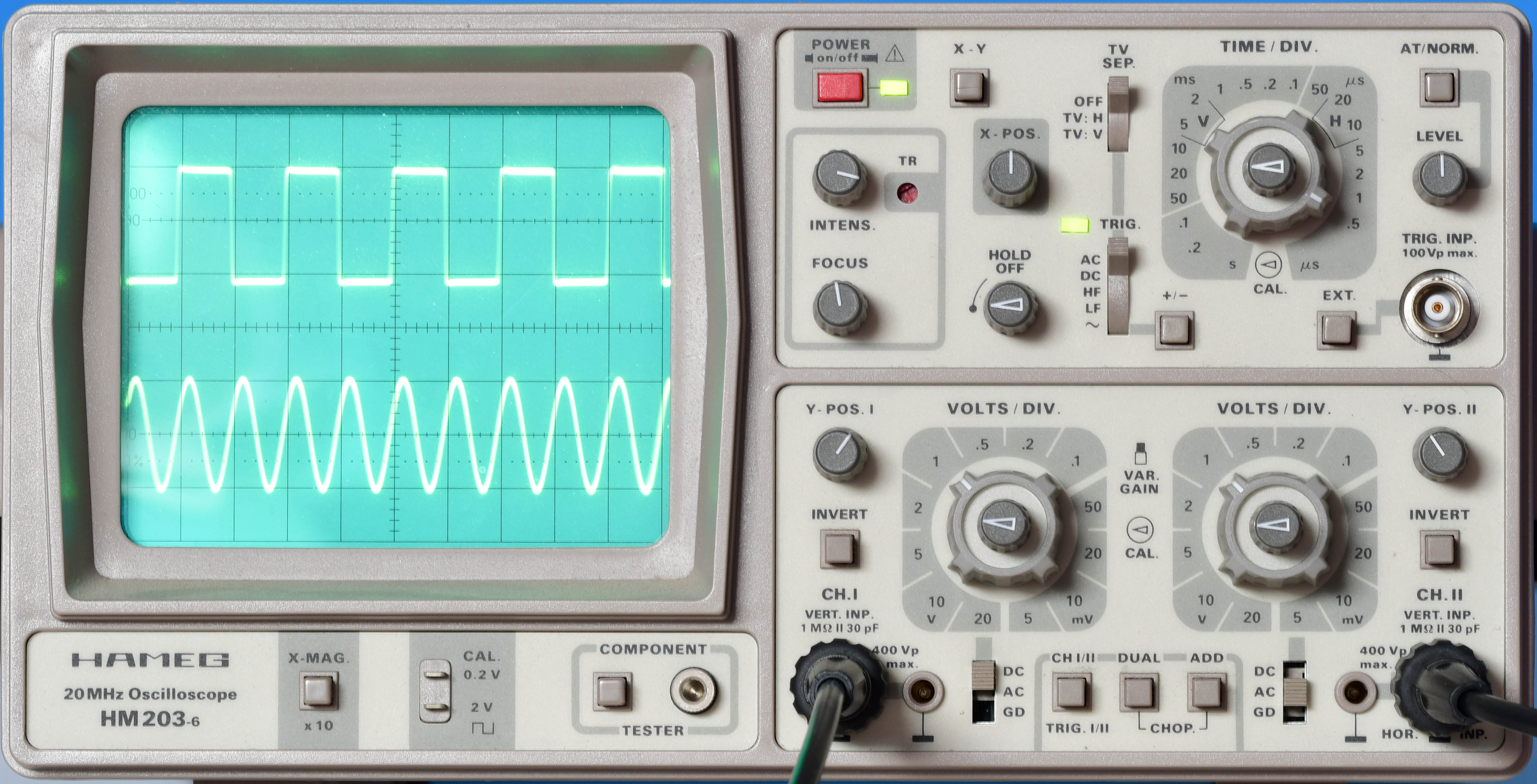
Typical two channel oscilloscope by HAMEG, HM203-6

With its three Test & Measurement, Technology Systems and Networks & Cybersecurity divisions the company generated net revenue of EUR 2.93 billion in the 2023/24 fiscal year.

R&S subsidiary for oscilloscopes HAMEG was producing the standard testing equipment for companies, schools and universities in Germany. In 2010, Rohde & Schwarz launched the world's first oscilloscope with a digital trigger.

More than 200 airports deploy Rohde & Schwarz radiocommunications systems. In 2011, the company began selling voice communications systems for air traffic control (ATC). These systems are based on a product from Topex SA, a company in which Rohde & Schwarz acquired a majority interest in 2010.

Rohde & Schwarz SIT GmbH develops crypto products and systems for government agencies, the German armed forces, authorities, the military and private industry. The subsidiary's high-security encryption technology is used for both wireless and wireline communications. As early as 2001, Rohde & Schwarz SIT launched the world's first crypto phone TopSec GSM.

=== IT-Network technology and cybersecurity ===
R&S provides product families for secure communication via WAN-, LAN- and WiFi-networks for business and state authorities.

=== Military SIGINT, ELINT and EW technology ===
R&S provides ELINT systems for comprehensive intelligence gathering capability especially for modern radar signals. Digital wideband recording preserves all signal properties such as instantaneous amplitude, frequency and phase and detects also frequency-modulated continuous wave (FMCW) radars and solid-state radars operating at very low power level.

=== Radio communication networks for armed forces ===
R&S supplies interoperable radio communication systems for military, government and civilian use. Like its competitor Thales, Elbit etc, the company develops software-defined radio devices (SDR). At R&S, radio and telecommunications reconnaissance have always been the highest-earning business areas with a small number of customers.

==== SOVERON ====
Soveron is a family of SDR radios for military tactical communication, developed by R&S. The radios work at HF, UHF and VHF spectrums and are based on an internationally common Software Communications Architecture standard with backward compatibility. The frequency spectrum ranges from 30 to 600 MHz; simultaneous transmission of voice and data in each radio channel with up to two voice channels is possible. The "Transect" fast frequency hopping technology provides robustness against jamming attacks. For bandwidth efficient voice compression is a MELPe codec used. Soveron is already used by a number of NATO and non-NATO forces.

When the Russian invasion of Ukraine started in 2022, the German government under Chancellor Olaf Scholz (SPD) decided on an off-budget fund ("Sondervermögen") for fitting of German armed forces for example by a state of the art command and information system. Rohde & Schwarz was awarded the contract for 2.9 billion EUR in 2022 for Armed Forces Joint Connected Radio Equipment (Streitkräftegemeinsame verbundfähige Funkausstattung (SVFuA)) and is delivering its Soveron program to Bundeswehr. Public known users of Soveron beside Bundeswehr are the Portuguese Army, the Canadian Armed Forces and an unidentified Asian armed force.

There are significant problems with the introduction of the Soveron system in the German Armed Forces. Tests of the system showed that it is too complex for use in, for example, main battle tanks and under combat conditions, where simple and reliable operation under stress and time-critical situations is required.

A second issue is the physical incompatibility of the devices with the approximately 200 different vehicles used by the German Armed Forces. The Soveron radios are too large and too heavy for many of the intended vehicles. A major problem is that the battery capacity of many vehicles is insufficient to power the energy-intensive digital radio stations. The alternators are too weak for the Soveron devices. In some vehicles, modifications to the cooling system are even necessary to cope with the additional heat generated by the digital systems.

=== Civil analytic and electronic test equipment for microwave and HF ===
The company supplies measurement solutions for cellular and wireless technologies from 6G, 5G, LTE, GSM, UMTS/HSPA(+), CDMA2000 to Bluetooth, GPS and wireless Internet access via WLAN and WiMAX. It offers devices for the development and production of chipsets, mobile devices and base stations. Network operators use Rohde & Schwarz products to plan, build and monitor their networks. R&S has developed suitable signal generators and analyzers for 5G and LTE Advanced.

Rohde & Schwarz develops measuring devices for radio links as well as radar and satellite communication systems for the aviation and defense industries. The company also offers complete systems for EMC and field strength meters. These are used for example to detect electromagnetic interference in automotive electronics.

=== Broadcast technology ===
From the early days R&S developed transmitter for various use. After WW II the company developed transmitters and instruments for radio and TV broadcasting. Rohde & Schwarz provides transmitters for analog and digital TV; to the US for the ATSC standard, to Asia and South-America for ISDB-T and to Europe for DVB-T2.

By acquiring smaller companies since 2015, R&S can now offer a whole portfolio for TV and radio production, as well as for transmitting the program.

=== Body scanner ===
Since 2016, Rohde & Schwarz has been manufacturing body scanners under the product name QPS (Quick Personnel Security Scanner). The devices are used in addition to baggage screening in airport check-in areas and other access-controlled areas. In 2025, Frankfurt Airport was the first to regularly use Rohde & Schwarz QPS Walk2000 walk-through security scanners.

== Customers ==
R&S is equipping German Bundeswehr and German Intelligent agency as well as military and state agencies worldwide. According to their own webpage, R&S has delivered technology to more than 40 navies.

In 2013 it became known that R&S was seeking to sell measurement technology to Iran for its missile program. Rohde and Schwarz wanted to sell its technology to Iran through an intermediary in the UAE.

The NSA spied on a number of German companies, including R&S, and passed this information on to the German Federal Prosecutor's Office and the Customs Criminal Investigation Bureau.

Since 2016, the European Organization for Nuclear Research (CERN) relies on a mobile network testing solution from Rohde & Schwarz to ensure mobile telephony and data services for all CERN employees.

Another milestone was reached in 2018 when six out of seven national broadcasters in the U.S. have chosen to deploy the Rohde & Schwarz R&S®THU9evo digital transmitter for their primary broadcasts from One World Trade Center in New York City.

According to a 2024 report by Denik N, tactical products from Rohde & Schwarz were allegedly transferred to Russian companies via shell companies. At least one of these companies supplies a state-run nuclear weapons research center. Russian state-owned enterprises and the military are said to have access to the products through a Czech factory. The electronic devices are also reportedly essential for Russia's electronic warfare capabilities. According to the media report, since the beginning of 2024, goods worth up to four million dollars (3.7 million euros) have found their way from Rohde & Schwarz's Czech branch to Russia via indirect routes.

In April 2026, FAA awarded Rohde & Schwarz USA to modernize the nation's ATC system. It initially installed a new Certium Voice Communication System (VCS) in August 2025 at Allegheny County Airport in Pennsylvania as the first installation for testing and then operation.

== Manufacturing ==
Rohde & Schwarz makes most of its equipment in Memmingen and Teisnach in Germany and Vimperk in the Czech Republic. It also operates smaller plants in Singapore and Malaysia for the final assembly and dispatch of selected products.

Memmingen makes electronic assemblies and microelectronic components and carries out final assembly of instruments. The plant also develops test equipment and has an accredited calibration laboratory. Teisnach produces circuit boards, housings and precision mechanical parts, along with complete radiocommunications systems, security scanners and broadcast transmitters. It also undertakes mechanical design and software development.

In Vimperk, Rohde & Schwarz began working with the local Tesla factory in 1991. It bought the factory in 2001, establishing its first manufacturing plant outside Germany. The plant makes the company's entire range of oscilloscopes, as well as signal generators and broadcast equipment. Work at the site ranges from making cables and assembling electronic components to building finished instruments.
