= FS-5000 HARPOON =

FS-5000 HARPOON

The FS-5000, codenamed HARPOON, is a modular, fully digital clandestine spy radio developed between 1985 and 1988 by AEG Telefunken in Germany for Cold War stay-behind (Gladio) networks. Operating as a part of the broader SY-5000 communication system, it allowed deep-cover agents to transmit high-speed, encrypted data over distances of up to 6,000 kilometres to a base station, making it incredibly resilient against interception. Built using a modular, watertight die-cast aluminium architecture precisely sized to fit discreetly inside a standard Samsonite attaché briefcase for urban camouflage.
