= SpiderCloud Wireless =

SpiderCloud Wireless was founded in November 2006 as Evoke Networks by Peter Wexler, Allan Baw, and Mark Gallagher. The trio incubated the company as Copivia Inc. and hired Mike Gallagher as CEO in October 2007. After closing the Series-A funding in January 2008, the company soon changed its name to SpiderCloud Wireless. The company is now headquartered in Milpitas, California. The company is backed by investors Charles River Ventures, Matrix Partners, Opus Capital, and Shasta Ventures. It has raised around US$125 million in venture capital and is generating revenue from customers such as Vodafone UK, Vodafone Netherlands, Verizon Wireless, Warid Telecom, and more. The company helps mobile operators improve service quality for enterprise customers.

SpiderCloud was acquired by Corning Inc. on July 19, 2017.
