= Wireless Innovation Forum =

- Founded: 1996
- Type: 501(c)6 Mutual Benefit Corporation
- Purpose: Commercial, Civil, and Defense Communications
- Origins: Modular Multifunction Information Transfer System Forum, Software Defined Radio Forum
- Region served: Worldwide
- Method: Industry standards, Conferences, Publications
- Members: 80+ Member Organizations
- Key people: John Glossner, Ph.D., CEO
- Employees: 2 (plus contractors and consultants)
- Volunteers: Approximately 1200 Member Representatives
- Website: wirelessinnovation.org

Established in 1996, the Wireless Innovation Forum is a non-profit "mutual benefit corporation" dedicated to advocating for spectrum innovation and advancing radio technologies that support essential or critical communications worldwide. Forum members bring a broad base of experience in Software Defined Radio, Cognitive Radio and Dynamic Spectrum Access technologies in diverse markets and at all levels of the wireless value chain to address emerging wireless communications requirements. The forum acts as a venue for its members to collaborate to achieve these objectives.

== History ==
The Wireless Innovation Forum was founded in 1996 originally as "The Modular Multifunction Information Transfer System Forum". The organization was created at the request of the US military services (led by the Air Force) as an industry association focused on advancing the development of software radio. In 1996, the Forum formed the Mobile Working Group to develop software specifications and standards supporting ground mobile radios.

The Forum published its first technical report in 1997, outlining the current state of the art in software defined radio. This document included a reference application framework for software defined radios, referred to as the Software Radio Architecture, that was developed based on the existing SPEAKeasy Architecture. The late 1990s, also saw the initial meeting between the Forum and what later became the Joint Tactical Radio System.

In 1998, the Modular Multifunction Information Transfer System Forum changed its legal name to The Software Defined Radio Forum and began doing business with a broader focus on commercial and international participation. The Forum created three new internal groups — Markets and Regulatory Committees and the Base Station Work Group. Also, the Forum published a revised technical report.

In 2001, the Forum contracted with Communications Research Centre Canada to provide a Software Communications Architecture (SCA) Reference Implementation (SCARI-Open). The Forum also made filings with the United States Federal Communications Commission that helped form their public rule making on software defined radio.

In 2002, the Forum hosted its first Technical Conference and Product Exposition, which has become an annual event with the presentation of technical papers along with tutorials, workshops and demonstrations.

In 2004 and 2005, the Forum reorganized to support its members in exploring technologies that extend beyond IT. A key part of this reorganization was the formation of the Cognitive Radio Work Group, which worked to support IEEE P1900.1 in defining standard definitions for Software Defined and Cognitive Radio and to establish a reference architecture for a cognitive radio system.

Between 2004 and 2010, the Forum signed memorandums of understanding with multiple international groups to allow collaboration in areas of mutual interest. These groups included the European End to End Efficiency Program, IEICE in Japan, IEEK in Korea, IEEE Standards Association, JTRS and the European Science Foundation. MOUs with a number of organizations continue to the present day.

In 2007, the Forum initiated the Smart Radio Challenge, a worldwide competition in which student engineering teams design, develop and test technologies that address relevant problems in the advanced wireless market.

== Rebranding ==
In late 2009, the Software Defined Radio Forum was renamed the Wireless Innovation Forum, reflecting the fact that many of the projects undertaken by its members had expanded to include Cognitive Radio, Systems of Systems, Ad Hoc Networks, and Dynamic Spectrum Access Technologies.

In addition, the Forum restructured to established separate “Commercialization Committees” focused on establishing “an ecosystem of vendors providing interoperable hardware and software radio components to drive the economies of scale that will ultimately reduce the costs of development, production and maintenance of wireless systems, while at the same time speeding time to market and time to deployment”. These committees are managed by the Forum's elected officers, which include the chair, vice chair, technical director, the chairs of the committees, the secretary, and the treasurer according to the Forum's bylaws (https://www.wirelessinnovation.org/Bylaws).

== Committees ==
The Forum is organized around three Commercialization Committees and one Technology Committee(https://www.wirelessinnovation.org/projects-committees), whose responsibilities are summarized as follows and presented in the order in which they were formed:

=== Software Defined Systems Committee ===
The Software Defined Systems Committee was originally created as the Coordinating Committee for International SCA Standards. This Committee was formed as a Commercialization Committee in 2010, and from 2010 to 2014, the members of the Committee worked with JTNC in the creation of what is now SCA 4.1 and the establishment test procedures for the SCA 4.1 standard. This activity culminated in 2015 with the endorsement by the Forum of SCA 4.1 as “a preferred software architecture for software defined radios”.

In parallel with the SCA 4.1 effort, the Committee began working to harmonize SCA application programming interfaces with the emerging European Secure Software Radio (ESSOR) architecture, following the endorsement of ESSOR’s “Three Basket Approach”. A key element of this support was the development of “Facility Standards", including a revised Transceiver Facility in 2017, an energy Management API in 2018, and a Timing Service Facility in 2020. The Forum also worked to establish Test and Certification Procedures for SCA 4.1.

In 2015, the Committee rebranded as the “Software Defined Systems Committee” following the publication of the Committee’s Strategic Plan.

In 2023, the JTNC “transferred the Software Communications Architecture (SCA) v2.2.2 test procedures and JTNC Test Application (JTAP) to the Wireless Innovation Forum to share with the SCA development community.”

=== Wireless Innovation Committee ===
The Wireless Innovation Committee was originally formed in 2013 as the Spectrum Innovation Committee. This Technology Committee was an evolution of the previous User Requirements Committee acting “to advocate for the innovative utilization of spectrum, and advancing radio technologies that support essential or critical communications”. The Committee previously defined and published a "Top 10 Most Wanted Wireless Innovations" list, and also manages the Forum's Advocacy Agenda.

The Committee was rebranded in 2015 to the Committee on Spectrum Innovation and then again in 2016 as the Advanced Technologies Committee to avoid name space confusion with the Spectrum Sharing Committee. The role of the committee had expanded at this point to include acting “as an incubator for exploring potential new markets relevant to the Forum’s mission”. The Committee rebranded again in 2022 to the Wireless Innovation Committee as a part of the Forum’s revised strategic plan.

=== CBRS Committee ===
The CBRS Committee spun out of the Spectrum Innovation Committee as the Spectrum Sharing Committee in 2015. The purpose of this Commercialization Committee was to “serve as a common industry and government standards body to support the development and advancement of spectrum sharing technologies based on the three-tier architecture proposed for the 3.5 GHz (CBRS Band) rulemaking activities”. The result of their initial efforts was the development of the baseline standards necessary for the commercialization of the band.

In 2019, the Spectrum Sharing Committee began work on “Release 2 Standards” to add new features and capabilities to the baseline specifications, and in 2023 they added “Release 1+ Standards” to address regulatory changes impacting the baseline specifications. The details of Release 1+ and Release 2 are captured in the Committee’s “Release Plan”.

In 2023, the Committee rebranded to the CBRS Committee reflecting their actual activities and in alignment with the Forum’s new Strategic Plan.

=== 6 GHz Committee ===
The 6 GHz Committee spun out of the Advanced Technologies Committee in 2019 to serve “as an industry body to study and specify sharing arrangements in spectrum designated for unlicensed operation in the U-NII-5 and U-NII-7 bands. This Commercialization Committee partnered with the Wi-Fi Alliance to deliver the system standardization and testing required for AFC System Certification.

=== Other committees ===
The WInnForum maintains a Regulatory Advisory Committee “made up of regulatory and public policy officials and experts from around the world who are working on or knowledgeable about issues relevant to advanced wireless and radio technologies”.

From 2014 to 2023, the WInnForum hosted an India Regional Committee supporting the needs of its member organizations based in India.

In 2022, the marketing work groups from each of the four active committees were merged into a “Joint Marketing Group” chartered to help promote WInnForum work products and activities and to define and coordinate messaging for approval, as appropriate, by the various steering groups.

== Membership ==
The membership of the Wireless Innovation Forum consists of commercial, defense, and civil government organizations at all levels of the wireless value chain, including wireless service providers, network operators, component and equipment manufacturers, hardware and software developers, regulatory agencies, and academia.

== Achievement awards ==
The Forum presents three achievement awards.

- The Vanu Bose Award for Leadership in Wireless Innovation (Replaces the International Achievement Award): This award is presented to an individual, group of individuals, or organization that made especially significant contributions in furthering the global mission of the Wireless Innovation Forum.
- Wireless Innovation Forum President’s Award (Replaces the Contributors Award): This Award is presented to individuals in recognition of their sustained outstanding contributions in support of the Wireless Innovation Forum and its activities.
- Wireless Innovation Forum Technology of the Year: This was previously awarded to an individual or organization for a breakthrough product or technology related to the WInnForum's top 10 Most Wanted Wireless Innovations list, which is no longer active.

Winners of the Wireless Innovation Forum Awards over the years can be found here: https://www.wirelessinnovation.org/sdr_achievement_awards Awards are also made each year to the authors of the top papers from the previous year's Technical Conference, as determined by an independent panel of judges.
