= Allied Minds =

American company

Allied Minds plc
- Type: Privately held company
- Industry: Investment
- Founded: 2004; 22 years ago
- Headquarters: Boston, United States
- Key people: Peter Dolan, (Chairman), Jill Smith, (CEO)
- Services: Intellectual property commercialization
- Revenue: £2.7 million (2016)
- Operating income: £(113.7) million (2016)
- Net income: £(128.9) million (2016)
- Website: www.alliedminds.com

Allied Minds is an American intellectual property (IP) commercialization company.

It was listed on the London Stock Exchange until November 2022. The company has technology transfer agreements with over 160 partners, including 34 U.S. federal research facilities, as well as university labs such as Harvard and New York University.

It reviews numerous IP assets per year, and forms, funds and manages start-ups that operate as subsidiaries. This IP commercialization model is relatively new to the US.

== History ==
The company was established by Mark Pritchard to exploit opportunities in intellectual property in 2004. Chris Silva was appointed chief executive officer and Director of the Company in 2006. It entered into an innovative arrangement with the United States Department of Defense in 2012 whereby incubation stage companies are formed to allow advanced technology to be prepared for the market: early examples included advanced technologies for wireless and internet networking.

This private-public partnership was expanded to the U.S. Army's Research Development, and Engineering Command; the Naval Surface Warfare Center, Crane Division, and the Aerospace Corp. In October 2013, Allied Minds signed an agreement with The MITRE Corp. to share intellectual property and technology in the cyber and mobile security field. This partnership was later expanded in July 2016 to provide Allied Minds’ federal intellectual property division Allied Minds Federal Innovations (AMFI) exclusive access to its portfolio.

The company completed an initial public offering in June 2014. In August 2014, Allied Minds announced a joint venture with Bristol-Myers Squibb called Allied-Bristol Life Sciences to form new biotech companies based on discoveries within its university laboratory network. The partnership received new funding in April 2016 to boost the pre-clinical development of new drugs.

In September 2016, Allied Minds announced a partnership with General Electric Co.’s venture capital unit to jointly invest in new companies based on both GE's R&D in healthcare, transportation, energy, and big data, as well as intellectual property from Allied Minds’ network of U.S. federal and university research partners. Under the terms of the agreement, Allied Minds and GE Ventures plan to invest in existing Allied Minds subsidiaries, technologies that GE develops in-house and desires to spin out, and new startups sourced from both companies.

Formerly a publicly traded company listed on the London Stock Exchange, the company delisted in November 2022 following a 64% fall in its share price over the previous year, becoming a privately held company.

== Operations ==
The company has partnerships with 130 American universities and 30 federal government departments in the United States.

== See also ==
- Intellectual property brokering
- Invention promotion firm
- Patent troll
- Patent monetization
