= Software-defined radio =

Radio communication system implemented in software

Software-defined radio (SDR) is a radio communication system where components that conventionally have been implemented in analog hardware (e.g. mixers, filters, amplifiers, modulators, demodulators, detectors, etc.) are instead implemented by means of software on a computer or embedded system.

A basic SDR system may consist of a computer equipped with a sound card, or other analog-to-digital converter, preceded by some form of RF front end. Significant amounts of signal processing are handed over to the general-purpose processor, rather than being done in special-purpose hardware (electronic circuits). Such a design produces a radio which can receive and transmit widely different radio protocols (sometimes referred to as waveforms) based solely on the software used.

Software radios have significant utility for the military and cell phone services, both of which must serve a wide variety of changing radio protocols in real time. In the long term, software-defined radios are expected by proponents like the Wireless Innovation Forum to become the dominant technology in radio communications. SDRs, along with software defined antennas are the enablers of cognitive radio.

== Operating principles ==
Software defined radio concept

A superheterodyne receiver uses a variable-frequency oscillator (VFO), a mixer, and a filter to tune the desired signal to a common intermediate frequency (IF) or baseband. Typically in SDR this signal is then sampled by the analog-to-digital converter. However, in some applications it is not necessary to tune the signal to an intermediate frequency and the radio-frequency signal is directly sampled by the analog-to-digital converter (after amplification).

Real analog-to-digital converters lack the dynamic range to pick up sub-microvolt, nanowatt-power radio signals produced by an antenna. Therefore, a low-noise amplifier must precede the conversion step and this device introduces its own problems. For example, if spurious signals are present (which is typical), these compete with the desired signals within the amplifier's dynamic range. They may introduce distortion in the desired signals, or may block them completely. The standard solution is to put band-pass filters between the antenna and the amplifier, but these reduce the radio's flexibility. Real software radios often have two or three analog channel filters with different bandwidths that are switched in and out.

The flexibility of SDR allows for dynamic spectrum usage, alleviating the need to statically assign the scarce spectral resources to a single fixed service.

== History ==
In 1970, a researcher at a United States Department of Defense laboratory coined the term "digital receiver". A laboratory called the Gold Room at TRW in California created a software baseband analysis tool called Midas, which had its operation defined in software.

In 1982, while working under a US Department of Defense contract at RCA, Ulrich L. Rohde's department developed the first SDR, which used the COSMAC (Complementary Symmetry Monolithic Array Computer) chip. Rohde was the first to present on this topic with his February 1984 talk, "Digital HF Radio: A Sampling of Techniques" at the Third International Conference on HF Communication Systems and Techniques in London.

In 1984, a team at the Garland, Texas, Division of E-Systems Inc. (now Raytheon) coined the term "software radio" to refer to a digital baseband receiver, as published in their E-Team company newsletter. A 'Software Radio Proof-of-Concept' laboratory was developed by the E-Systems team that popularized software radio within various government agencies. This 1984 software radio was a digital baseband receiver that provided programmable interference cancellation and demodulation for broadband signals, typically with thousands of adaptive filter taps, using multiple array processors accessing shared memory.

In 1991, Joe Mitola independently reinvented the term software radio for a plan to build a GSM base station that would combine Ferdensi's digital receiver with E-Systems Melpar's digitally controlled communications jammers for a true software-based transceiver. E-Systems Melpar sold the software radio idea to the US Air Force. Melpar built a prototype commanders' tactical terminal in 1990–1991 that employed Texas Instruments TMS320C30 processors and Harris Corporation digital receiver chip sets with digitally synthesized transmission. The Melpar prototype didn't last long because when E-Systems ECI Division manufactured the first limited production units, they decided to "throw out those useless C30 boards", replacing them with conventional RF filtering on transmit and receive and reverting to a digital baseband radio instead of the SpeakEasy like IF ADC/DACs of Mitola's prototype. The Air Force would not let Mitola publish the technical details of that prototype, nor would they let Diane Wasserman publish related software life cycle lessons learned because they regarded it as a "USAF competitive advantage". So instead, with USAF permission, in 1991, Mitola described the architecture principles without implementation details in a paper, "Software Radio: Survey, Critical Analysis and Future Directions" which became the first IEEE publication to employ the term in 1992. When Mitola presented the paper at the conference, Bob Prill of GEC Marconi began his presentation following Mitola with: "Joe is absolutely right about the theory of a software radio and we are building one." Prill gave a GEC Marconi paper on PAVE PILLAR, a SpeakEasy precursor. SpeakEasy, the military software radio was formulated by Wayne Bonser, then of Rome Air Development Center (RADC), now Rome Labs; by Alan Margulies of MITRE Rome, NY; and then Lt Beth Kaspar, the original DARPA SpeakEasy project manager and by others at Rome including Don Upmal. Although Mitola's IEEE publications resulted in the largest global footprint for software radio, Mitola privately credits that DoD lab of the 1970s with its leaders Carl, Dave, and John with inventing the digital receiver technology on which he based software radio once it was possible to transmit via software.

A few months after the National Telesystems Conference 1992, in an E-Systems corporate program review, a vice-president of E-Systems Garland Division objected to Melpar's (Mitola's) use of the term "software radio" without credit to Garland. Alan Jackson, Melpar VP of marketing at that time, asked the Garland VP if their laboratory or devices included transmitters. The Garland VP said: "No, of course not — ours is a software radio receiver." Al replied: "Then it's a digital receiver but without a transmitter, it's not a software radio." Corporate leadership agreed with Al, so the publication stood. Many amateur radio operators and HF radio engineers had realized the value of digitizing HF at RF and of processing it with Texas Instruments TI C30 digital signal processors (DSPs) and their precursors during the 1980s and early 1990s. Radio engineers at Roke Manor in the UK and at an organization in Germany had recognized the benefits of ADC at the RF in parallel. Mitola's publication of software radio in the IEEE opened the concept to the broad community of radio engineers. His May 1995 special issue of the IEEE Communications Magazine with the cover "Software Radio" was regarded as a watershed event with thousands of academic citations. Mitola was introduced by Joao da Silva in 1997 at the First International Conference on Software Radio as "godfather" of software radio in no small part for his willingness to share such a valuable technology "in the public interest".

Perhaps the first software-based radio transceiver was designed and implemented by Peter Hoeher and Helmuth Lang at the German Aerospace Research Establishment (DLR, formerly DFVLR) in Oberpfaffenhofen, Germany, in 1988. Both transmitter and receiver of an adaptive digital satellite modem were implemented according to the principles of a software radio, and a flexible hardware periphery was proposed.

In 1995, Stephen Blust coined the term "software defined radio", publishing a request for information from Bell South Wireless at the first meeting of the Modular Multifunction Information Transfer Systems (MMITS) forum in 1996 (in 1998 the name was changed to the Software Defined Radio Forum), organized by the USAF and DARPA around the commercialization of their SpeakEasy II program. Mitola objected to Blust's term, but finally accepted it as a pragmatic pathway towards the ideal software radio. Although the concept was first implemented with an IF ADC in the early 1990s, software-defined radios have their origins in the U.S. and European defense sectors of the late 1970s (for example, Walter Tuttlebee described a VLF radio that used an ADC and an 8085 microprocessor), about a year after the First International Conference in Brussels. One of the first public software radio initiatives was the U.S. DARPA-Air Force military project named SpeakEasy. The primary goal of the SpeakEasy project was to use programmable processing to emulate more than 10 existing military radios, operating in frequency bands between 2 and 2000 MHz. Another SpeakEasy design goal was to be able to easily incorporate new coding and modulation standards in the future, so that military communications can keep pace with advances in coding and modulation techniques.

In 1997, Blaupunkt introduced the term "DigiCeiver" for their new range of DSP-based tuners with Sharx in car radios such as the Modena & Lausanne RD 148.

=== SpeakEasy phase I ===
From 1990 to 1995, the goal of the SpeakEasy program was to demonstrate a radio for the U.S. Air Force tactical ground air control party that could operate from 2 MHz to 2 GHz, and thus could interoperate with ground force radios (frequency-agile VHF, FM, and SINCGARS), Air Force radios (VHF AM), Naval Radios (VHF AM and HF SSB teleprinters) and satellites (microwave QAM). Some particular goals were to provide a new signal format in two weeks from a standing start, and demonstrate a radio into which multiple contractors could plug parts and software.

The project was demonstrated at TF-XXI Advanced Warfighting Exercise, and demonstrated all of these goals in a non-production radio. There was some discontent with failure of these early software radios to adequately filter out of band emissions, to employ more than the simplest of interoperable modes of the existing radios, and to lose connectivity or crash unexpectedly. Its cryptographic processor could not change context fast enough to keep several radio conversations on the air at once. Its software architecture, though practical enough, bore no resemblance to any other. The SpeakEasy architecture was refined at the MMITS Forum between 1996 and 1999 and inspired the DoD integrated process team (IPT) for programmable modular communications systems (PMCS) to proceed with what became the Joint Tactical Radio System (JTRS).

The basic arrangement of the radio receiver used an antenna feeding an amplifier and down-converter (see Frequency mixer) feeding an automatic gain control, which fed an analog-to-digital converter that was on a computer VMEbus with a lot of digital signal processors (Texas Instruments C40s). The transmitter had digital-to-analog converters on the PCI bus feeding an up converter (mixer) that led to a power amplifier and antenna. The very wide frequency range was divided into a few sub-bands with different analog radio technologies feeding the same analog to digital converters. This has since become a standard design scheme for wideband software radios.

=== SpeakEasy phase II ===
The goal was to get a more quickly reconfigurable architecture, i.e., several conversations at once, in an open software architecture, with cross-channel connectivity (the radio can "bridge" different radio protocols). The secondary goals were to make it smaller, cheaper, and weigh less.

The project produced a demonstration radio only fifteen months into a three-year research project. This demonstration was so successful that further development was halted, and the radio went into production with only a 4 MHz to 400 MHz range.

The software architecture identified standard interfaces for different modules of the radio: "radio frequency control" to manage the analog parts of the radio, "modem control" managed resources for modulation and demodulation schemes (FM, AM, SSB, QAM, etc.), "waveform processing" modules actually performed the modem functions, "key processing" and "cryptographic processing" managed the cryptographic functions, a "multimedia" module did voice processing, a "human interface" provided local or remote controls, there was a "routing" module for network services, and a "control" module to keep it all straight.

The modules are said to communicate without a central operating system. Instead, they send messages over the PCI computer bus to each other with a layered protocol.

As a military project, the radio strongly distinguished "red" (unsecured secret data) and "black" (cryptographically-secured data).

The project was the first known to use FPGAs (field programmable gate arrays) for digital processing of radio data. The time to reprogram these was an issue limiting application of the radio. Today, the time to write a program for an FPGA is still significant, but the time to download a stored FPGA program is around 20 milliseconds. This means an SDR could change transmission protocols and frequencies in one fiftieth of a second, probably not an intolerable interruption for that task.

=== 2000s ===
The SpeakEasy SDR system in the 1994 uses a Texas Instruments TMS320C30 CMOS digital signal processor (DSP), along with several hundred integrated circuit chips, with the radio filling the back of a truck. By the late 2000s, the emergence of RF CMOS technology made it practical to scale down an entire SDR system onto a single mixed-signal system-on-a-chip, which Broadcom demonstrated with the BCM21551 processor in 2007. The Broadcom BCM21551 has practical commercial applications, for use in 3G mobile phones.

== Military usage ==
=== United States ===
The Joint Tactical Radio System (JTRS) was a program of the US military to produce radios that provide flexible and interoperable communications. Examples of radio terminals that require support include hand-held, vehicular, airborne and dismounted radios, as well as base-stations (fixed and maritime).

This goal is achieved through the use of SDR systems based on an internationally endorsed open Software Communications Architecture (SCA). This standard uses CORBA on POSIX operating systems to coordinate various software modules.

The program is providing a new approach to meet additional soldier communications needs through software programmable radio technology. All functionality and expandability is built upon the SCA.

The SCA, despite its military origin, is under evaluation by commercial radio vendors for applicability in their domains. The adoption of general-purpose SDR frameworks outside of military, intelligence, experimental and amateur uses, however, is inherently hampered by the fact that civilian users can more easily settle with a fixed architecture, optimized for a specific function, and as such more economical in mass market applications. Still, software defined radio's inherent flexibility can yield substantial benefits in the longer run, once the fixed costs of implementing it have gone down enough to overtake the cost of iterated redesign of purpose built systems. This then explains the increasing commercial interest in the technology.

SCA-based infrastructure software and rapid development tools for SDR education and research are provided by the Open Source SCA Implementation – Embedded (OSSIE) project. The Wireless Innovation Forum funded the SCA Reference Implementation project, an open source implementation of the SCA specification. (SCARI) can be downloaded for free.

== Amateur and home use ==
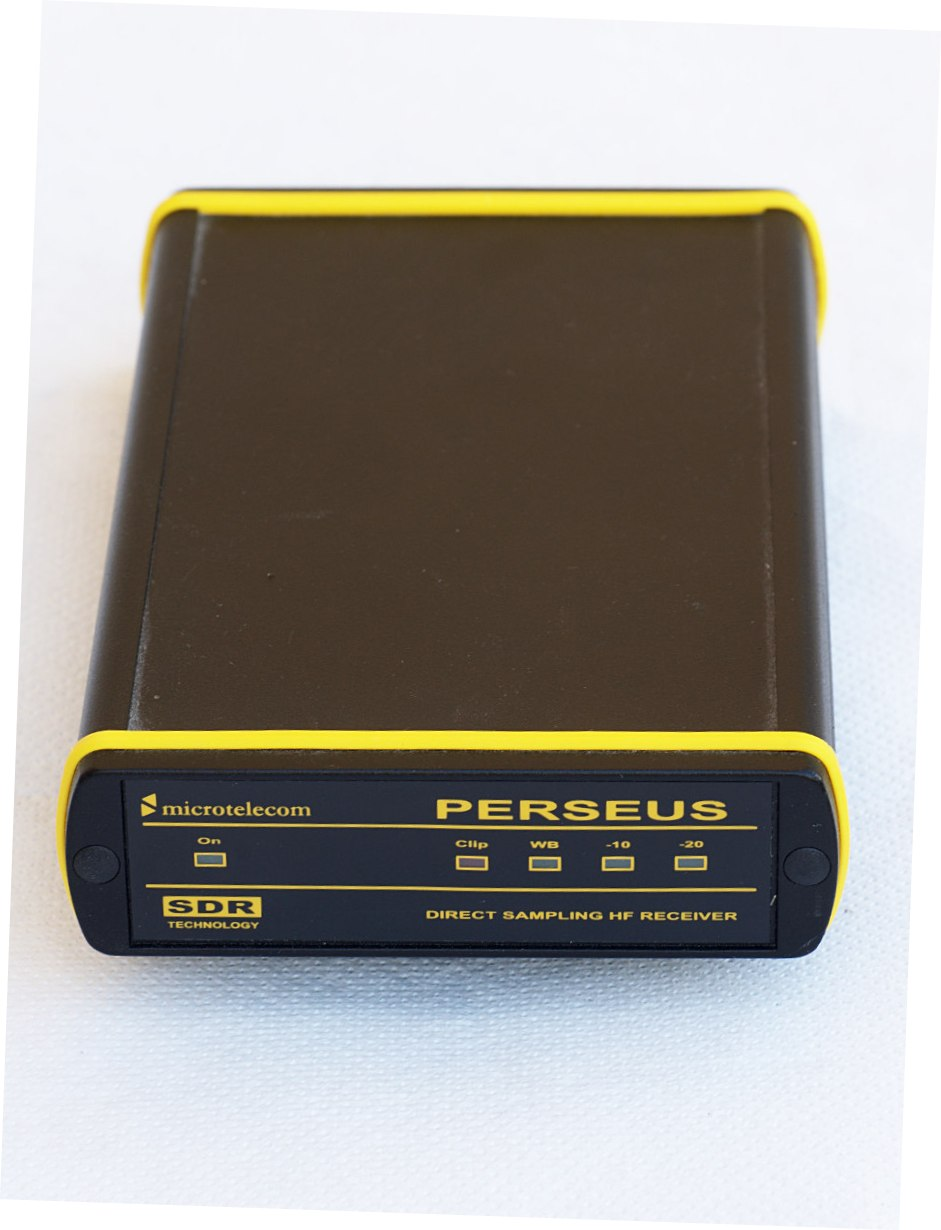
Microtelecom Perseus – an HF SDR for the amateur radio market

A typical amateur software radio uses a direct conversion receiver. Unlike direct conversion receivers of the more distant past, the mixer technologies used are based on the quadrature sampling detector and the quadrature sampling exciter.

The receiver performance of this line of SDRs is directly related to the dynamic range of the analog-to-digital converters (ADCs) utilized. Radio frequency signals are down converted to the audio frequency band, which is sampled by a high performance audio frequency ADC. First generation SDRs used a 44 kHz PC sound card to provide ADC functionality. The newer software defined radios use embedded high performance ADCs that provide higher dynamic range and are more resistant to noise and RF interference.

A fast PC performs the digital signal processing (DSP) operations using software specific for the radio hardware. Several software radio implementations use the open source SDR library DttSP.

The SDR software performs all of the demodulation, filtering (both radio frequency and audio frequency), and signal enhancement (equalization and binaural presentation). Uses include every common amateur modulation: morse code, single-sideband modulation, frequency modulation, amplitude modulation, and a variety of digital modes such as radioteletype, slow-scan television, and packet radio. Amateurs also experiment with new modulation methods: for instance, the DREAM open-source project decodes the COFDM technique used by Digital Radio Mondiale.

There is a broad range of hardware for radio amateurs and home use. There are professional-grade transceivers, e.g. the Zeus ZS-1 or FlexRadio, home-built transceivers, e.g. PicAStar or the SoftRock SDR kit, and starter or professional receivers, e.g. the FiFi SDR for shortwave, or the Quadrus coherent multi-channel SDR receiver for short wave or VHF/UHF in direct digital mode of operation.

=== RTL-SDR ===
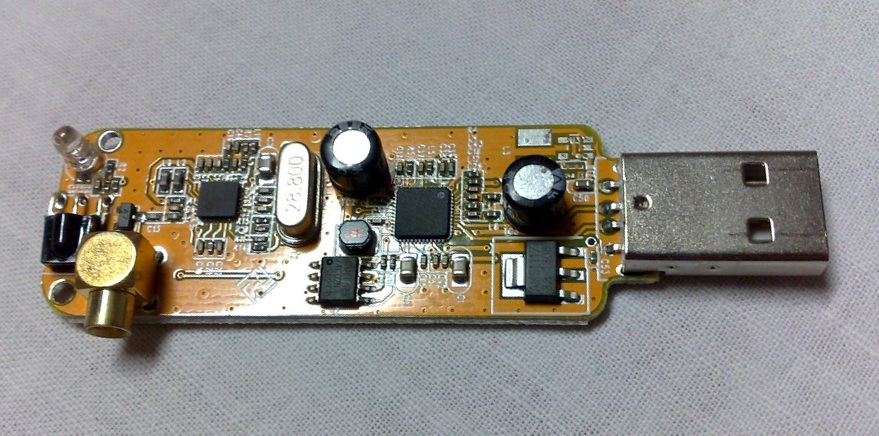
Interior of RTL-SDR showing RTL2832U demodulator (right) and R820T tuner (left).

RTL-SDR is a type of low-cost software-defined radio receiver named after the Realtek RTL2832U demodulator chip on which it is based, which supports USB output. Originally designed for DVB-T reception, the chip was found in 2010 to output raw radio signal data. With drivers developed by the Osmocom project, these devices were repurposed as general-purpose SDR receivers. Early DVB-T USB sticks often sold for under US$10, while models purpose-built as SDR receivers with improved shielding and frequency stability sold for about US$30 as of 2025.

RTL-SDR devices typically include a Rafael Micro R820T, R820T2, or R860 tuner chip, and can receive frequencies from approximately 24 to 1766 MHz with a bandwidth of up to 3.2 MHz. They are used for applications including FM and digital radio reception, aircraft data reception (ADS-B, ACARS), trunked radio decoding, weather satellite reception (GOES, Meteor-M), radiosonde tracking, and basic radio astronomy.

=== HPSDR ===
The HPSDR (High Performance Software Defined Radio) project uses a 16-bit 135 MSPS analog-to-digital converter that provides performance over the range 0 to 55 MHz comparable to that of a conventional analogue HF radio. The receiver will also operate in the VHF and UHF range using either mixer image or alias responses. Interface to a PC is provided by a USB 2.0 interface, although Ethernet could be used as well. The project is modular and comprises a backplane onto which other boards plug in. This allows experimentation with new techniques and devices without the need to replace the entire set of boards. An exciter provides 1/2 W of RF over the same range or into the VHF and UHF range using image or alias outputs.

=== WebSDR ===
WebSDR is a project initiated by Pieter-Tjerk de Boer providing access via an internet browser to multiple SDR receivers worldwide covering the complete shortwave spectrum. De Boer has analyzed Chirp Transmitter signals using the coupled system of receivers..

=== KiwiSDR ===
KiwiSDR is also a via-browser SDR like WebSDR. Unlike WebSDR, the frequency is limited to 3 Hz to 30 MHz (ELF to HF)

OpenWebRX, an open-source software project, provides access to VHF and UHF spectrum as well.

== Other applications ==
On account of its increasing accessibility, with lower cost hardware, more software tools and documentation, the applications of SDR have expanded past their primary and historic use cases. SDR is now being used in areas such as wildlife tracking, radio astronomy, medical imaging research, and art.

== See also ==
- List of software-defined radios
- List of amateur radio software
- Digital radio
- Digital signal processing (DSP)
- Radio Interface Layer (RIL)
- Softmodem
- Software defined mobile network (SDMN)
- Software GNSS Receiver
- White space (radio)
- White space (database)
- Bit banging
