= Software Communications Architecture =

Open architecture framework for software-defined radio

The Software Communications Architecture (SCA) is an open architecture framework that defines a standard way for radios to instantiate, configure, and manage waveform applications running on their platform. The SCA separates waveform software from the underlying hardware platform, facilitating waveform software portability and re-use to avoid costs of redeveloping waveforms. The latest version is SCA 4.1.

== Overview ==
The SCA is published by the Joint Tactical Networking Center (JTNC). This architecture was developed to assist in the development of Software Defined Radio (SDR) communication systems, capturing the benefits of recent technology advances which are expected to greatly enhance interoperability of communication systems and reduce development and deployment costs. The architecture is also applicable to other embedded, distributed-computing applications such as Communications Terminals or Electronic Warfare (EW). The SCA has been structured to:

1. Provide for portability of applications software between different SCA implementations,
2. Leverage commercial standards to reduce development cost,
3. Reduce software development time through the ability to reuse design modules, and
4. Build on evolving commercial frameworks and architectures.

The SCA is deliberately designed to meet commercial application requirements as well as those of military applications. Since the SCA is intended to become a self-sustaining standard, a wide cross-section of industry has been invited to participate in the development and validation of the SCA. The SCA is not a system specification but an implementation independent set of rules that constrain the design of systems to achieve the objectives listed above.

== Core Framework ==
The Core Framework (CF) defines the essential "core" set of open software interfaces and profiles that provide for the deployment, management, interconnection, and intercommunication of software application components in an embedded, distributed-computing communication system. In this sense, all interfaces defined in the SCA are part of the CF.

== Standard Waveform Application Programming Interfaces (APIs) ==
The Standard Waveform APIs define the key software interfaces that allow the waveform application and radio platform to interact. SCA use the APIs to separate waveform software from the underlying hardware platform, facilitating waveform software portability and re-use to avoid costs of redeveloping waveforms.

== Development Tools ==
- VIStology SCA-Pass - SCA 4.1 Waveform Conformance Verification IDE
- Reservoir Labs' R-Check - SCA Compliance Testing
- NordiaSoft eCo Suite - SCA 4.1 Integrated Development Environment and Core Framework
- ADLINK Spectra CX4 - SCA 4.1 Model Driven Tools

== Top News ==
- Software Communications Architecture v4.1 entered into the Department of Defense (DoD) Information Technology (IT) Standards Registry (DISR) as a mandated standard
