= Mobile network codes in ITU region 3xx (North America) =

This list contains the mobile country codes and mobile network codes for networks with country codes between 300 and 399, inclusively – a region that covers North America and the Caribbean. Guam and the Northern Mariana Islands are included in this region as parts of the United States.

== National operators ==
=== A ===
==== Anguilla (United Kingdom) – AI ====
MCC	MNC	Brand	Operator	Status	Bands (MHz)	References and notes
365	010		Digicel	Operational	GSM 850 / UMTS 850 / UMTS 1900 / LTE 700	
365	840	FLOW	Cable & Wireless	Operational	UMTS 850 / UMTS 1900 / LTE 700	GSM shut down Apr 2024

==== Antigua and Barbuda – AG ====
MCC	MNC	Brand	Operator	Status	Bands (MHz)	References and notes
344	030	inet	Antigua Public Utilities Authority	Operational	LTE	GSM shut down Apr 2018
344	050	Digicel	Antigua Wireless Ventures Limited	Operational	UMTS 850 / LTE 700	LTE band 17; GSM shut down May 2024
344	920	FLOW	Cable & Wireless Caribbean Cellular (Antigua) Limited	Operational	UMTS 850 / LTE 1700	GSM shut down Jul 2024
344	930		AT&T Wireless	Unknown	Unknown	

==== Aruba (Kingdom of the Netherlands) – AW ====
MCC	MNC	Brand	Operator	Status	Bands (MHz)	References and notes
363	01	SETAR	Servicio di Telecomunicacion di Aruba	Operational	UMTS 2100 / LTE 1800 / TDMA 800	GSM shut down Aug 2026
363	02	Digicel	Digicel Aruba	Operational	UMTS 2100 / LTE 1800	GSM shut down Apr 2024

=== B ===
==== Bahamas – BS ====
MCC	MNC	Brand	Operator	Status	Bands (MHz)	References and notes
364	39	BTC	The Bahamas Telecommunications Company Ltd (BaTelCo)	Operational	UMTS 850 / LTE 700 / LTE 1700	LTE band 17 and 4; GSM shut down Jun 2024
364	49	Aliv	Cable Bahamas Ltd	Operational	UMTS 850 / LTE 700 / LTE 1700	Former NewCo2015; LTE bands 13 and 4; license also covers Band 2

==== Barbados – BB ====
MCC	MNC	Brand	Operator	Status	Bands (MHz)	References and notes
342	600	FLOW	LIME (formerly known as Cable & Wireless)	Operational	GSM 1900 / UMTS 850 / LTE 850 / LTE 1900 / 5G	LTE bands 5 / 2
342	646		KW Telecommunications Inc.	Not operational	LTE 700	LTE band 13
342	750	Digicel	Digicel (Barbados) Limited	Operational	UMTS 2100 / LTE 700 / LTE 1900 / 5G	LTE bands 17 / 2; GSM shut down Dec 2025
342	800	Ozone	Ozone Wireless Inc.	Not operational	LTE 700	LTE band 13; MNC withdrawn; shut down July 2019
342	820		Neptune Communications Inc.	Not operational	LTE 700	LTE band 14; former Sunbeach Communications

==== Bermuda – BM ====
MCC	MNC	Brand	Operator	Status	Bands (MHz)	References and notes
310	59	Cellular One		Not operational	CDMA	USA MCC
338	050	Digicel		Operational	GSM 1900 / UMTS 850 / UMTS 1900 / LTE 700 / 5G 3500	uses Jamaica MCC
350	00	One	Bermuda Digital Communications Ltd.	Operational	GSM 1900 / UMTS 850 / LTE 700 / 5G 3500	Former CellOne
350	007		Paradise Mobile	Operational	LTE 700 / LTE 1700 / 5G 3500	
350	01	Digicel Bermuda	Telecommunications (Bermuda & West Indies) Ltd	Reserved	GSM 1900	uses Jamaica MNC/MCC (338–050)
350	02	Mobility	M3 Wireless	Not operational	GSM 1900 / UMTS	Merged with CellOne in 2011
350	05		Telecom Networks	Unknown	Unknown	
350	11		Deltronics	Unknown	Unknown	
350	15		FKB Net Ltd.	Unknown	Unknown	

==== British Virgin Islands (United Kingdom) – VG ====
MCC	MNC	Brand	Operator	Status	Bands (MHz)	References and notes
348	170	FLOW	Cable & Wireless	Operational	UMTS 850 / LTE 700 / LTE 1900	GSM shut down Apr 2024
348	370		BVI Cable TV Ltd	Unknown	Unknown	
348	570	CCT Boatphone	Caribbean Cellular Telephone	Operational	GSM 900 / GSM 1900 / UMTS 850 / LTE 900 / LTE 1900	
348	770	Digicel	Digicel (BVI) Limited	Operational	GSM 1800 / GSM 1900 / UMTS 1900 / LTE 700 / LTE 1700	

=== C ===
==== Canada – CA ====
MCC	MNC	Brand	Operator	Status	Bands (MHz)	References and notes
302	060		Karrier One Inc.	Unknown	LTE / 5G	
302	100	dotmobile	Data on Tap Inc.	Not operational	MVNO	MNC withdrawn
302	130	Xplore	Xplore Inc.	Not operational	TD-LTE 3500 / WiMAX / 5G 3500	Former Xplornet; MNC withdrawn
302	131	Xplore	Xplore Inc.	Operational	TD-LTE 3500 / WiMAX / 5G 3500	Former Xplornet
302	140	Fibernetics	Fibernetics Corp.	Not Operational	LTE 1900	Ontario
302	150		Cogeco Connexion Inc.	Unknown	Unknown	
302	151		Cogeco Connexion Inc.	Not operational	Unknown	MNC withdrawn
302	152		Cogeco Connexion Inc.	Not operational	Unknown	MNC withdrawn
302	160		Sugar Mobile Inc.	Not operational	MVNO	Owned by Iristel; MNC withdrawn
302	220	Telus Mobility, Koodo Mobile, Public Mobile	Telus Mobility	Operational	UMTS 850 / UMTS 1900 / LTE 1700 / LTE 1900 / LTE 2600 / 5G 1700 / 5G 3500	Used in IMSI to identify Telus subscribers on shared network 302–880
302	221	Telus	Telus Mobility	Unknown	Unknown	
302	222	Telus	Telus Mobility	Unknown	Unknown	
302	230		ISP Telecom	Unknown	Unknown	
302	250		Bell Mobility	Unknown	Unknown 1700	Former ALO Mobile Inc.
302	270	EastLink	Bragg Communications	Operational	UMTS 1700 / LTE 700 / LTE 1700 / 5G 600	Nova Scotia and PEI; LTE bands 13, 4
302	290	Airtel Wireless	Airtel Wireless	Not operational	iDEN 900	Calgary, AB; MNC withdrawn
302	300	ECOTEL	Ecotel inc.	Operational	LTE 700 / LTE 850 / LTE 2600	private LTE networks
302	301	ECOTEL	Ecotel inc.	Operational	LTE 700 / LTE 850 / LTE 2600	private LTE networks
302	310	ECOTEL	Ecotel inc.	Operational	LTE 700 / LTE 850 / LTE 2600	private LTE networks
302	320	Rogers Wireless	Rogers Communications	Operational	UMTS 1700	Former Mobilicity
302	330		OpenMobile Inc.	Unknown	5G	Former Blue Canada Wireless;
302	340	Execulink	Execulink	Operational	MVNO	
302	350		Naskapi Imuun Inc.	Unknown	Unknown	Former FIRST Networks
302	351		MPVWifi Inc.	Not operational	LTE 3500	MNC withdrawn
302	352	Lyttonnet	Lytton Area Wireless Society	Not operational	Unknown	MNC withdrawn
302	353		SpeedFI Inc.	Unknown	Unknown	
302	354		Every-Day Computers Inc.	Unknown	Unknown	
302	360	MiKe	Telus Mobility	Not operational	iDEN 800	iDEN shut down January 2016
302	361	Telus	Telus Mobility	Not operational	CDMA 800 / CDMA 1900	CDMA shut down 31 May 2017; MNC withdrawn
302	370	Fido	Fido Solutions (Rogers Wireless)	Operational	MVNO	former Microcell Telecommunications
302	380	Keewaytinook Mobile	Keewaytinook Okimakanak Mobile	Operational	UMTS 850 / UMTS 1900	Former Dryden Mobility
302	390	DMTS	Dryden Mobility	Not operational	Unknown	Acquired by Tbaytel in 2012; MNC withdrawn
302	420	Telus	Telus Mobility	Operational	TD-LTE 3500	Former Allen Business Communications; British Columbia
302	480	Qiniq	SSi Connexions	Operational	GSM 1900 / LTE 2600	Nunavut
302	490	Freedom Mobile	Quebecor	Operational	UMTS 1700 / LTE 700 / LTE 1700 / LTE 2600 / 5G 600 / 5G 1700	Former Wind Mobile; LTE bands 4, 7, 13, 66
302	491	Freedom Mobile	Quebecor	Unknown	Unknown	
302	500	Videotron	Videotron	Operational	LTE 700 / LTE 1700 / 5G 600 / 5G 1700 / 5G 2600	LTE bands 13, 4; 5G bands n71, n66, n7; UMTS shutdown July 2025
302	510	Videotron	Videotron	Operational	LTE 700 / LTE 1700 / 5G 600 / 5G 1700 / 5G 2600	LTE bands 13, 4
302	520	Rogers (Vidéotron MOCN)	Videotron	Operational	Unknown	Used by Vidéotron on Rogers RAN with MOCN
302	530	Keewaytinook Mobile	Keewaytinook Okimakanak Mobile	Operational	GSM	Northwestern Ontario; also spelled Keewatinook Okimacinac
302	540		Rovvr Communications Inc.	Not operational	Unknown	
302	550		Star Solutions International Inc.	Unknown	LTE?	Private LTE
302	560	Lynx Mobility	Lynx Mobility	Not operational	CDMA / GSM	Northern Quebec, Nunavut, Labrador; MNC withdrawn
302	570		Ligado Networks Corp.	Unknown	Satellite	Former LightSquared
302	590	Quadro Mobility	Quadro Communications Co-op	Operational	Unknown	Southwestern Ontario
302	600		Iristel	Unknown	Unknown	
302	610	Bell Mobility	Bell Mobility	Operational	UMTS 850 / UMTS 1900 / LTE 700 / LTE 1700 / LTE 1900 / LTE 2600 / 5G 1700 / 5G 3500	Used in IMSI to identify Bell subscribers on shared network 302–880; LTE bands 17, 29, 4, 2, 7
302	620	ICE Wireless	ICE Wireless	Operational	UMTS 850 / GSM 1900 / LTE 850 / LTE 1900	Northern Canada
302	630	Aliant Mobility	Bell Aliant	Unknown	Unknown	
302	640	Bell	Bell Mobility	Not operational	CDMA 800 / CDMA 1900	CDMA shut down in April 2019
302	650	TBaytel	Thunder Bay Telephone	Operational	UMTS 850 / UMTS 1900 / LTE 2600	
302	652		BC Tel Mobility (Telus)	Not operational	CDMA2000	CDMA shut down 31 May 2017; MNC withdrawn
302	653	Telus	Telus Mobility	Not operational	CDMA 800 / CDMA 1900	CDMA shut down 31 May 2017; MNC withdrawn
302	655	MTS	Bell MTS	Not operational	CDMA 800 / CDMA 1900	former Manitoba Telephone System; CDMA shut down 30 Apr 2019; MNC withdrawn
302	656	TBay	Thunder Bay Telephone Mobility	Not operational	CDMA	CDMA shut down 1 October 2014; MNC withdrawn
302	657	Telus	Telus Mobility	Not operational	CDMA 800 / CDMA 1900	CDMA shut down 31 May 2017; MNC withdrawn
302	660	MTS	Bell MTS	Operational	UMTS 850 / UMTS 1900 / LTE 1700	
302	670	CityTel Mobility	CityWest	Unknown	Unknown	
302	680	SaskTel	SaskTel Mobility	Operational	TD-LTE 2600	CDMA 850 shut down 5 July 2017
302	681	SaskTel	SaskTel Mobility	Not operational	Unknown	MNC withdrawn
302	690	Bell	Bell Mobility	Operational	UMTS 850 / UMTS 1900	
302	701		MB Tel Mobility	Not operational	CDMA2000	MNC withdrawn
302	702		MT&T Mobility (Aliant)	Not operational	CDMA2000	MNC withdrawn
302	703		New Tel Mobility (Aliant)	Not operational	CDMA2000	MNC withdrawn
302	710	Globalstar	Globalstar Canada Satellite Co.	Operational	Satellite CDMA	
302	720	Rogers Wireless	Rogers Communications	Operational	GSM 850 / LTE 600 / LTE 700 / LTE 850 / LTE 1700 / LTE 1900 / LTE 2600 / 5G 600 / 5G 1700 / TD-5G 2600 / 5G 3500	former Rogers AT&T Wireless; LTE bands 2, 4, 5, 7, 12, 17, 25, 66, 71; 5G bands n38, n41, n66, n71, n78; GSM 1900 / UMTS 1900 shut down June 2021, UMTS 850 in Aug 2025
302	721	Rogers Wireless	Rogers Communications	Operational	LTE 700 / LTE 1700 / LTE 1900 / LTE 2600	Used for private LTE deployments
302	722	Rogers Wireless	Rogers Communications	Unknown	Unknown	
302	723	Rogers Wireless	Rogers Communications	Operational	LTE 1900	Used for satellite Direct to Cell on Band 2
302	724	Rogers Wireless	Rogers Communications	Not operational	Unknown	MNC withdrawn
302	725	Rogers Wireless	Rogers Communications	Not operational	Unknown	MNC withdrawn
302	730	TerreStar Solutions	TerreStar Networks	Unknown	Unknown	
302	731	TerreStar Solutions	TerreStar Networks	Unknown	Unknown	
302	740	Rogers Wireless	Rogers Communications	Unknown	Unknown	Former Shaw Communications
302	741	Rogers Wireless	Rogers Communications	Unknown	Unknown	
302	750	SaskTel	SaskTel Mobility	Unknown	Unknown	
302	760	Public Mobile	Telus Mobility	Operational	MVNO	Acquired by Telus, CDMA network shut down 2014
302	770	TNW Wireless	TNW Wireless Inc.	Not operational	UMTS 850	Former Rural Com; MNC withdrawn
302	780	SaskTel	SaskTel Mobility	Operational	UMTS 850 / UMTS 1900 / LTE 600 / LTE 700 / LTE 850 / LTE 1900 / LTE 1700 / LTE 2600 / 5G 1700 / 5G 3500	Saskatchewan
302	781	SaskTel	SaskTel Mobility	Not operational	Unknown	MNC withdrawn
302	790	NetSet	Xplore Inc.	Operational	WiMAX / TD-LTE 3500	Manitoba
302	820	Rogers Wireless	Rogers Communications	Unknown	Unknown	
302	821	Rogers Wireless	Rogers Communications	Not operational	Unknown	MNC withdrawn
302	848		Vocom International Telecommunications, Inc	Not operational	Unknown	MNC withdrawn
302	860	Telus	Telus Mobility	Unknown	Unknown	
302	880	Bell / Telus / SaskTel	Shared Telus, Bell, and SaskTel	Operational	UMTS 850 / UMTS 1900	
302	910		Halton Regional Police Service	Operational	LTE 700	
302	911		Halton Regional Police Service	Operational	LTE 700	
302	912		Halton Regional Police Service	Operational	LTE 700	
302	920	Rogers Wireless	Rogers Communications	Not operational	Unknown	MNC withdrawn
302	940	Wightman Mobility	Wightman Telecom	Operational	UMTS 850 / UMTS 1900	
302	970		Canadian Pacific Kansas City Railway	Unknown	Unknown	
302	971		Canadian National Railway	Unknown	Unknown	
302	972		Hydro-Québec	Unknown	Unknown	
302	975		BC Hydro	Unknown	Unknown	
302	990		Ericsson Canada	Unknown	Unknown	For testing
302	991		Halton Regional Police Service	Unknown	Unknown	For testing
302	992		AltaLink Management Ltd	Not operational	Unknown	MNC withdrawn
302	996		BC Hydro	Not operational	Unknown	Former Powertech Labs (testing); MNC withdrawn
302	997		Powertech Labs	Not operational	Unknown	MNC withdrawn
302	998		Institut de Recherche d’Hydro-Québec	Unknown	Unknown	Former Powertech Labs; for testing

==== Cayman Islands (United Kingdom) – KY ====
MCC	MNC	Brand	Operator	Status	Bands (MHz)	References and notes
338	05	Digicel	Digicel Cayman Ltd.	Operational	UMTS 2100 / LTE 700 / LTE 1800 / 5G 3500	LTE bands 13 / 3; GSM shut down July 2020
346	001	Logic	WestTel Ltd.	Not operational	LTE 2500	LTE band 41; fixed wireless access
346	007		Paradise Mobile Limited	Not operational	5G	To launch in 2024
346	140	FLOW	Cable & Wireless (Cayman Islands) Limited	Operational	GSM 850 / GSM 1900 / UMTS 850 / LTE 700 / LTE 1900 / 5G 3500	LTE bands 17 / 2
346	050	Digicel	Digicel Cayman Ltd.	Reserved		Uses Jamaica MCC

==== Cuba – CU ====
MCC	MNC	Brand	Operator	Status	Bands (MHz)	References and notes
368	01	CUBACEL	Empresa de Telecomunicaciones de Cuba, SA	Operational	GSM 900 / GSM 850 / UMTS 900 / UMTS 2100 / LTE 700 / LTE 900 / LTE 1800 / LTE 2100	GSM 850 only available in limited areas (Havana, Varadero, Trinidad and Cayo Coco)

=== D ===
==== Dominica – DM ====
MCC	MNC	Brand	Operator	Status	Bands (MHz)	References and notes
366	020	Digicel	Digicel Group Limited	Operational	GSM 900 / GSM 1900 / UMTS 900 / UMTS 1900 / LTE 700	Former Orange Dominica
366	110	FLOW	Cable & Wireless	Operational	GSM 850 / UMTS 850 / LTE 700	

==== Dominican Republic – DO ====
MCC	MNC	Brand	Operator	Status	Bands (MHz)	References and notes
370	01	Altice	Altice Group	Operational	GSM 900 / GSM 1800 / GSM 1900 / UMTS 900 / LTE 850 / LTE 900 / LTE 1700 / LTE 1900 / 5G 3500	Former Orange Dominicana
370	02	Claro	Compañía Dominicana de Teléfonos	Operational	GSM 850 / GSM 1900 / UMTS 850 / LTE 1700 / LTE 1900 / LTE 2600 / 5G 3500	CDMA 1900 shut down in 2014
370	03	Altice	Altice Group	Operational	AMPS / CDMA 850	Former Tricom, S.A, 1900 MHz spectrum returned to regulator
370	04	Viva	Trilogy Dominicana, S.A.	Operational	GSM 1900 / UMTS 1900 / LTE 1700 (unlicensed)	Former Centennial Dominicana
370	05	Wind	WIND Telecom, S.A	Operational	TD-LTE 2600	LTE band 38

=== F ===
==== French Antilles (France) – BL/GF/GP/MF/MQ ====
includes

- French Guiana (France) – GF
- Guadeloupe (France) – GP
- Martinique (France) – MQ
- Saint Barthélemy (France) – BL
- Saint Martin (France) – MF

MCC	MNC	Brand	Operator	Status	Bands (MHz)	References and notes
340	01	Orange	Orange Caraïbe Mobiles	Operational	GSM 900 / UMTS 2100 / LTE 800 / LTE 1800 / LTE 2100 / LTE 2600 / 5G 3500	Guadeloupe, French Guiana, Martinique, Saint Barthélemy, Saint Martin
340	02	SFR Caraïbe	Outremer Telecom	Operational	GSM 900 / GSM 1800 / UMTS 2100 / LTE 800 / LTE 1800 / LTE 2600	Guadeloupe, French Guiana, Martinique; former Only
340	03	FLOW	UTS Caraïbe	Operational	GSM 900 / GSM 1800 / UMTS / LTE 1800	Saint Barthélemy, Saint Martin; former Telcell
340	04	Free	Free Caraïbe	Operational	UMTS 900 / UMTS 2100 / LTE 800 / LTE 1800 / LTE 2600	
340	05	Free	Free Caraïbe	Unknown	Unknown	
340	08	Dauphin	Dauphin Telecom	Operational	GSM 900 / GSM 1800 / UMTS / LTE	Saint Barthélemy, Saint Martin
340	09	Free	Free Caraïbe	Upcoming	UMTS 900 / UMTS 2100 / LTE 800 / LTE 1800 / LTE 2600	
340	10	SRIR	SOCIETE DE REALISATION D'INFRASTRUCTURES DE RESEAUX	Unknown	Unknown	Former Guadeloupe Téléphone Mobile
340	11		Guyane Téléphone Mobile	Not operational	Unknown	MNC withdrawn
340	12		Martinique Téléphone Mobile	Not operational	Unknown	MNC withdrawn
340	20	Digicel	DIGICEL Antilles Française Guyane	Operational	GSM 900 / UMTS 2100 / LTE 800	Guadeloupe, French Guiana, Martinique, Saint Barthélemy, Saint Martin; former Bouygues Telecom Caraïbes

=== G ===
==== Grenada – GD ====
MCC	MNC	Brand	Operator	Status	Bands (MHz)	References and notes
352	021	Spice Mobile	Affordable Island Communications Inc. (AIsleCom)	Operational	CDMA / LTE / LTE 700	
352	030	Digicel	Digicel Grenada Ltd.	Operational	GSM 900 / GSM 1800 / UMTS 2100 / LTE 700 / LTE 1900	Also uses MCC 338 MNC 05 (Jamaica)
352	110	FLOW	Cable & Wireless Grenada Ltd.	Operational	GSM 850 / UMTS 850 / LTE 700	

==== Guam (United States of America) – GU ====
MCC	MNC	Brand	Operator	Status	Bands (MHz)	References and notes
310	032	IT&E Wireless	PTI Pacifica Inc.	Operational	CDMA 1900 / GSM 1900 / UMTS 1900 / LTE 700	
310	033		Guam Telephone Authority	Unknown	Unknown	
310	140	GTA Wireless	Teleguam Holdings, LLC	Operational	GSM 850 / GSM 1900 / UMTS 850 / LTE 1700 / 5G 2500 / 5G 3500 / 5G 26000	Previously called Guam Telephone Authority mPulse
310	370	Docomo	NTT DoCoMo Pacific	Operational	GSM 1900 / UMTS 850 / LTE 700 / 5G	Formerly HafaTEL, then Guamcell; CDMA 850 shut down in late 2010
310	400	IT&E Wireless	PTI Pacifica Inc.	Not operational	GSM 1900 / UMTS 1900 / LTE 700	Former iConnect, Wave Runner LLC; MNC withdrawn
310	470	Docomo	NTT DoCoMo Pacific	Unknown	Unknown	
310	480	IT&E Wireless	PTI Pacifica Inc.	Operational	iDEN	Former iConnect, Wave Runner LLC
311	120	IT&E Wireless	PTI Pacifica Inc.	Operational	Unknown	Former iConnect, Wave Runner LLC
311	250	IT&E Wireless	PTI Pacifica Inc.	Not operational	Unknown	Former iConnect, Wave Runner LLC; MNC withdrawn

=== H ===
==== Haiti – HT ====
MCC	MNC	Brand	Operator	Status	Bands (MHz)	References and notes
372	01	Voila	Communication Cellulaire d'Haiti S.A.	Not operational	GSM 850	Sold to Digicel in 2012
372	02	Digicel	Unigestion Holding S.A.	Operational	GSM 900 / GSM 1800 / UMTS 2100	
372	03	Natcom	NATCOM S.A.	Operational	GSM 900 / GSM 1800 / UTMS 2100 / LTE 800	60% owned by Viettel

=== J ===
==== Jamaica – JM ====
MCC	MNC	Brand	Operator	Status	Bands (MHz)	References and notes
338	020	FLOW	LIME (Cable & Wireless)	Not operational	Unknown	MNC withdrawn
338	040	Caricel	Symbiote Investment Limited	Not operational	LTE	MNC withdrawn
338	05	Digicel	Digicel (Jamaica) Limited	Operational	UMTS 850 / LTE 700 / LTE 850 / LTE 1700 / LTE 1900	GSM shut down August 2024
338	070	Claro	Oceanic Digital Jamaica Limited	Not operational	GSM / UMTS / CDMA	shut down 2012
338	080		Rock Mobile Limited	Unknown	LTE 700	
338	110	FLOW	Cable & Wireless Communications	Operational	LTE	Used for satellite Direct to Cell on Band ?
338	111	FLOW	Cable & Wireless Communications	Unknown	Unknown	
338	180	FLOW	Cable & Wireless Communications	Operational	UMTS 850 / LTE 700 / LTE 1700 / LTE 1900 / 5G	GSM shut down April 2024

=== M ===
==== Mexico – MX ====
MCC	MNC	Brand	Operator	Status	Bands (MHz)	References and notes
334	001		Comunicaciones Digitales Del Norte, S.A. de C.V.	Unknown	Unknown	
334	010	AT&T	AT&T Mexico	Not operational	iDEN 800	Former Nextel; shut down 2017
334	020	Telcel	América Móvil	Operational	GSM 1900 / UMTS 850 / UMTS 1900 / LTE 850 / LTE 1700 / LTE 2600 / 5G 3500	former Radiomóvil Dipsa;
334	030	Movistar	Telefónica	Operational	MVNO	former Pegaso PCS; MVNO on AT&T, own spectrum returned, GSM shut down Sep 2020
334	040	Unefon	AT&T COMERCIALIZACIÓN MÓVIL, S. DE R.L. DE C.V.	Not operational	CDMA 850 / CDMA 1900	Shut down 2016
334	050	AT&T / Unefon	AT&T Mexico	Operational	UMTS 850 / UMTS 1900 / UMTS 1700 / LTE 850 / LTE 1700 / LTE 2600 / TD-LTE 2600 / 5G 2600	Former Iusacell; GSM shut down 2019
334	060		Servicios de Acceso Inalambrico, S.A. de C.V.	Not operational	Unknown	MNC withdrawn
334	066		Telefonos de México, S.A.B. de C.V.	Unknown	Unknown	
334	070	Unefon	AT&T Mexico	Unknown	Unknown	
334	080	Unefon	AT&T Mexico	Unknown	Unknown	
334	090	AT&T	AT&T Mexico	Operational	UMTS 1700 / LTE 850 / LTE 1700	Former Nextel
334	100		Financiera para el Bienestar	Unknown	Unknown	Former Telecomunicaciones de México
334	110		Maxcom Telecomunicaciones, S.A.B. de C.V.	Unknown	MVNO	Former Celmax Movil
334	120		Quickly Phone, S.A. de C.V.	Unknown	MVNO	
334	130		ALESTRA SERVICIOS MÓVILES, S.A. DE C.V.	Operational	Unknown	Division of Axtel
334	140	Red Compartida	Altán Redes S.A.P.I. de C.V.	Operational	LTE 700	
334	150	Ultranet	Ultravisión, S.A. de C.V.	Operational	LTE 2600	
334	160		Televisión Internacional, S.A. de C.V.	Unknown	Unknown	Former Cablevisión Red
334	170		OXIO Mobile, S.A. de C.V.	Unknown	MVNO	
334	180	FreedomPop	FREEDOMPOP MÉXICO, S.A. de C.V.	Operational	MVNO	
334	190	Viasat	VIASAT TECNOLOGÍA, S.A. de C.V.	Operational	Satellite	
334	200	Virgin Mobile	VIRGIN MOBILE MÉXICO, S. de R.L. de C.V.	Operational	MVNO	
334	210	YO Mobile	Yonder Media Mobile México, S. de R.L. de C.V.	Operational	MVNO	
334	220	Megamóvil	Mega Cable, S.A. de C.V	Operational	MVNO	
334	230		VINOC, S.A.P.I. de C.V.	Unknown	Unknown	
334	240		PEGASO PCS, S.A. DE C.V. (Movistar)	Unknown	Unknown	

==== Montserrat (United Kingdom) – MS ====
MCC	MNC	Brand	Operator	Status	Bands (MHz)	References and notes
338	05	Digicel	Digicel	Operational	GSM 850 / UMTS 850 / LTE	Uses Jamaica MCC
354	860	FLOW	Cable & Wireless	Operational	GSM 850 / UMTS 850 / LTE	

=== N ===
==== Former Netherlands Antilles (Kingdom of the Netherlands) – BQ/CW/SX ====
includes

- Bonaire, Saba, Sint Eustatius (Kingdom of the Netherlands) – BQ
- Curaçao (Kingdom of the Netherlands) – CW
- Sint Maarten – SX

MCC	MNC	Brand	Operator	Status	Bands (MHz)	References and notes
362	31		Eutel N.V.	Unknown	GSM	Sint Eustatius
362	33		WICC N.V.	Unknown	GSM	
362	51	Telcell	Telcell N.V.	Operational	UMTS 2100 / LTE 1800	Sint Maarten; GSM shut down Jan 2019
362	54	ECC	East Caribbean Cellular	Operational	GSM 900 / GSM 1800	
362	59	FLOW	Liberty Latin America	Not operational	GSM 900 / GSM 1800	Bonaire, Saba, Sint Eustatius, Sint Maarten; former Radcomm N.V., UTS; shut down Sep 2017
362	60	FLOW	Liberty Latin America	Operational	UMTS 2100 / LTE 1800	Bonaire, Saba, Sint Eustatius, Sint Maarten; former Radcomm N.V., UTS
362	63		CSC N.V.	Unknown	Unknown	
362	68	Digicel	Curaçao Telecom N.V.	Operational	UMTS 2100 / LTE 1800	Curaçao
362	69	Digicel	Curaçao Telecom N.V.	Operational	GSM 900 / GSM 1800	Curaçao
362	74		PCS N.V.	Unknown	Unknown	
362	76	Digicel	Antiliano Por N.V.	Operational	GSM 900 / UMTS 2100 / LTE 1800	Bonaire
362	78	Kla Mobile	Telefonia Bonairiano (Telbo) N.V.	Operational	UMTS 900 / LTE 1800	Bonaire
362	91	FLOW	Liberty Latin America	Operational	UMTS 850 / UMTS 2100 / LTE 1800	Curaçao; former Setel N.V., UTS; GSM shut down Nov 2023
362	94	Bayòs	Bòbò Frus N.V.	Operational	TDMA PCS	Mobile Solutions
362	95	MIO	E.O.C.G. Wireless	Not operational	CDMA2000 850	former GSM Caribbean N.V.; bankrupt in 2013

==== Northern Mariana Islands (United States of America) – MP ====
MCC	MNC	Brand	Operator	Status	Bands (MHz)	References and notes
310	110	IT&E Wireless	PTI Pacifica Inc.	Operational	CDMA / GSM 850 / UMTS 1900 / LTE 700	
310	370	Docomo	NTT DoCoMo Pacific	Operational	GSM 1900 / UMTS / LTE	

=== P ===
==== Puerto Rico – PR ====
MCC	MNC	Brand	Operator	Status	Bands (MHz)	References and notes
310	017	ProxTel	North Sight Communications Inc.	Not operational	iDEN	US MCC; MNC withdrawn
310	260	T-Mobile	T-Mobile US	Operational	GSM 1900 / LTE 600 / LTE 1900 / LTE 1700 / 5G 600 / 5G 850 / 5G 2500	US MCC; UMTS shut down July 2022
310	280	AT&T	AT&T Mobility	Not operational	GSM 1900	Former Centennial Puerto Rico; US MCC
313	510		Puerto Rico Telecom Company	Unknown	Unknown	Uses US MCC
313	790	Liberty	Liberty Cablevision of Puerto Rico LLC	Operational	LTE 700 / LTE 850 / LTE 1700 / LTE 1900 / LTE 2300 / 5G 600 / 5G 850 / 5G 39000	Uses US MCC; UMTS shut down Feb 2022
330	000	Open Mobile	PR Wireless	Not operational	CDMA 1900	
330	110	Claro Puerto Rico	América Móvil	Operational	GSM 850 / GSM 1900 / UMTS 850 / LTE 700 / LTE 850 / LTE 1700 / LTE 2500 / 5G 1700 / 5G 2500 / 5G 28000	
330	120	Open Mobile	PR Wireless	Not operational	LTE 700	

=== S ===
==== Saint Kitts and Nevis – KN ====
MCC	MNC	Brand	Operator	Status	Bands (MHz)	References and notes
356	050	Digicel	Wireless Ventures (St Kitts-Nevis) Limited	Operational	GSM 900 / GSM 1800 / LTE 700	
356	070	FLOW	UTS	Operational		
356	110	FLOW	Cable & Wireless St. Kitts & Nevis Ltd	Operational	LTE 700	GSM shut down Apr 2024

==== Saint Lucia – LC ====
MCC	MNC	Brand	Operator	Status	Bands (MHz)	References and notes
338	05	Digicel	Digicel	Operational	GSM 900 / GSM 1800 / GSM 1900 / LTE 700	uses Jamaica MCC
358	110	FLOW	Cable & Wireless	Operational	GSM 850 / LTE 700	

==== Saint Pierre and Miquelon (France) – PM ====
MCC	MNC	Brand	Operator	Status	Bands (MHz)	References and notes
308	01		SPM Telecom	Operational	GSM 900 / LTE	Former Ameris, St. Pierre-et-Miquelon Télécom
308	02	GLOBALTEL	GLOBALTEL	Operational	GSM 900 / LTE 800	
308	03		SPM Telecom	Unknown	Unknown	Former Ameris, St. Pierre-et-Miquelon Télécom
308	04	GLOBALTEL	GLOBALTEL	Unknown	Unknown	

==== Saint Vincent and the Grenadines – VC ====
MCC	MNC	Brand	Operator	Status	Bands (MHz)	References and notes
360	050	Digicel	Digicel (St. Vincent and the Grenadines) Limited	Operational	GSM 900 / GSM 1800 / GSM 1900 / LTE 700	
360	100	Cingular Wireless		Unknown	GSM 850	
360	110	FLOW	Cable & Wireless (St. Vincent & the Grenadines) Ltd	Operational	LTE 700	GSM shut down Sep 2023

=== T ===
==== Trinidad and Tobago – TT ====
MCC	MNC	Brand	Operator	Status	Bands (MHz)	References and notes
374	01	bmobile	TSTT	Not operational	GSM 850 / GSM 1900	Withdrawn
374	12	bmobile	TSTT	Operational	GSM 850 / UMTS 850 / UMTS 1900 / LTE 700 / LTE 1700 / LTE 1900 / TD-LTE 2500 / 5G 2500	LTE bands 2 / 4 / 28 / 41; band 41 used for FWA
374	13	Digicel	Digicel (Trinidad & Tobago) Limited	Not operational	GSM 850 / GSM 1900 / UMTS 850 / UMTS 1900	Withdrawn
374	20	bmobile	TSTT	Not operational	GSM 850 / GSM 1900	Withdrawn
374	120	bmobile	TSTT	Not operational	GSM 850 / GSM 1900	Withdrawn
374	129	bmobile	TSTT	Not operational	GSM 850 / GSM 1900 / UMTS 850 / UMTS 1900	Withdrawn
374	130	Digicel	Digicel (Trinidad & Tobago) Limited	Operational	UMTS 850 / UMTS 1900 / LTE 700 / LTE 1700 / LTE 1900	LTE bands 28 / 4 / 2; GSM shut down Dec 2025
374	140	Laqtel	LaqTel Ltd.	Not operational	CDMA	Shut down 2008; Withdrawn

==== Turks and Caicos Islands – TC ====
MCC	MNC	Brand	Operator	Status	Bands (MHz)	References and notes
338	050	Digicel	Digicel (Turks & Caicos) Limited	Operational	GSM 900 / GSM 1900 / LTE 700 / LTE 1700	uses Jamaica MCC
376	350	FLOW	Cable & Wireless West Indies Ltd (Turks & Caicos)	Operational	UMTS 850 / LTE 700	GSM shut down Apr 2024
376	351	Digicel	Digicel (Turks & Caicos) Limited	Not operational	Unknown	MNC withdrawn
376	352	FLOW	Cable & Wireless West Indies Ltd (Turks & Caicos)	Not operational	UMTS 850	Former IslandCom MNC withdrawn
376	360	Digicel	Digicel (Turks & Caicos) Limited	Reserved	Unknown	Former IslandCom, Cable & Wireless

=== U ===
==== United States of America – US ====
MCC	MNC	Brand	Operator	Status	Bands (MHz)	References and notes
310	004	Verizon	Verizon Wireless	Operational	Unknown	
310	005	Verizon	Verizon Wireless	Not operational	CDMA2000 850 / CDMA2000 1900	CDMA shut down Dec 2022
310	006	Verizon	Verizon Wireless	Operational	Unknown	
310	010	Verizon	Verizon Wireless	Operational	Unknown	Former MCI Inc.
310	012	Verizon	Verizon Wireless	Operational	LTE 700 / LTE 1700 / LTE 1900	
310	013	Verizon	Verizon Wireless	Unknown	Unknown	Former MobileTel, Alltel
310	014			Not operational	Unknown	For testing; MNC withdrawn
310	015	Southern LINC	Southern Communications	Unknown	Unknown	
310	016	AT&T	AT&T Mobility	Not operational	CDMA2000 1900 / CDMA2000 1700	Former Cricket Wireless; shut down in September 2015
310	017	ProxTel	North Sight Communications Inc.	Not operational	iDEN	Puerto Rico; MNC withdrawn
310	020	Union Wireless	Union Telephone Company	Operational	UMTS / LTE	GSM shut down in 2015
310	030	mobi	mobi	Unknown	Unknown	Former Centennial Wireless, AT&T
310	032	IT&E Wireless	PTI Pacifica Inc.	Operational	CDMA 1900 / GSM 1900 / UMTS 1900 / LTE 700	Guam
310	033		Guam Telephone Authority	Unknown	Unknown	
310	034	Airpeak	Airpeak	Operational	iDEN	Former Nevada Wireless
310	035	ETEX Wireless	ETEX Communications, LP	Not operational	Unknown	MNC withdrawn
310	040	Mobi	Mobi, Inc.	Unknown	Unknown	Formerly Concho Cellular Telephone Co.; then Alaska, Matanuska Telephone Association, Inc. shut down 2017;
310	050	GCI	Alaska Communications	Operational	CDMA	Former ACS Wireless Inc.
310	053	Virgin Mobile	T-Mobile US	Operational	MVNO	Former Sprint Corporation
310	054		Alltel US	Operational	Unknown	Uses Sprint's network
310	060		Karrier One	Unknown	5G	Former Consolidated Telcom, North Dakota
310	066	UScellular	United States Cellular Corporation	Operational	GSM / CDMA	
310	070	AT&T	AT&T Mobility	Operational	GSM 850	Former Highland Cellular, Cingular
310	080	AT&T	AT&T Mobility	Operational	GSM 1900	Former Corr Wireless Communications LLC
310	090	AT&T	AT&T Mobility	Operational	GSM 1900	Former Edge Wireless, Cingular, Cricket Wireless
310	100	Plateau Wireless	New Mexico RSA 4 East LP	Operational	GSM 850 / UMTS 850 / UMTS 1700	Acquired by AT&T
310	110	IT&E Wireless	PTI Pacifica Inc.	Operational	CDMA / GSM 850 / UMTS 1900 / LTE 700	Northern Mariana Islands
310	120	T-Mobile	T-Mobile US	Not operational	LTE 850 / LTE 1900	Former Sprint Corporation; CDMA shut down May 2022, LTE in June 2022
310	130	Carolina West Wireless	Carolina West Wireless	Operational	CDMA2000 1900	North Carolina; network to shut down 30 Sep 2026
310	140	GTA Wireless	Teleguam Holdings, LLC	Operational	GSM 850 / GSM 1900 / UMTS 850 / LTE 1700	Previously called Guam Telephone Authority mPulse
310	150	AT&T	AT&T Mobility	Operational	GSM 850 / UMTS 850 / UMTS 1900	Originally BellSouth Mobility DCS, then Cingular Wireless, then Aio Wireless, then rebranded as the new GSM Cricket Wireless
310	160	T-Mobile	T-Mobile US	Not operational	GSM 1900	GSM shut down Aug 2026
310	170	AT&T	AT&T Mobility	Operational	GSM 1900	Formerly Pacific Bell Wireless, then Cingular Wireless CA/NV known as "Cingular Orange"
310	180	West Central	West Central Wireless	Not operational	GSM 850 / UMTS 850 / UMTS 1900	shut down Aug 2023
310	190	GCI	Alaska Communications	Operational	GSM 850	Dutch Harbor, Alaska
310	200		T-Mobile	Not operational	GSM 1900	
310	210		T-Mobile	Not operational	GSM 1900	Iowa
310	220		T-Mobile	Not operational	GSM 1900	Kansas / Oklahoma
310	230		T-Mobile	Not operational	GSM 1900	Utah
310	240		T-Mobile	Not operational	GSM 1900	New Mexico / Texas / Arizona
310	250		T-Mobile	Not operational	GSM 1900	Hawaii
310	260	T-Mobile	T-Mobile US	Operational	LTE 600 / LTE 700 / LTE 1900 / LTE 1700 / LTE 2500 / 5G 600 / 5G 1900 / 5G 1700 / 5G 2500 / 5G 26000 / 5G 28000 / 5G 39000	Former Cook Inlet West Wireless, Voicestream; now universal USA code. Also used for Mint Mobile, Ting. UMTS shut down July 2022, GSM shut down Aug 2026
310	270		T-Mobile	Not operational	GSM 1900	Formerly Powertel
310	280	AT&T	AT&T Mobility	Not operational	GSM 1900	Former Centennial Puerto Rico
310	290	nep	NEP Cellcorp Inc.	Not operational	GSM 1900	Shut down 22 September 2015; MNC withdrawn
310	300	Big Sky Mobile	iSmart Mobile, LLC	Not operational	GSM 1900	Montana; former Get Mobile Inc., SmartCall, LLC; acquired by T-Mobile in 2017; MNC withdrawn
310	310		T-Mobile	Not operational	GSM 1900	Formerly Aerial Communications
310	311		Farmers Wireless	Not operational	GSM 1900	NE Alabama; acquired by AT&T in 2008
310	320	Cellular One	Smith Bagley, Inc.	Operational	GSM 850 / GSM 1900 / UMTS / LTE	Arizona / New Mexico
310	330		Wireless Partners, LLC	Unknown	LTE	Former AN Subsidiary LLC, AWCC, acquired by AT&T, CDMA shut down February 2015
310	340	Limitless Mobile	Limitless Mobile, LLC	Operational	GSM 1900	Kansas; Former High Plains Midwest LLC dba Westlink Communications, acquired by United Wireless in 2013
310	350	Verizon	Verizon Wireless	Not operational	CDMA	Former Mohave Cellular L.P.
310	360	Pioneer Cellular	Cellular Network Partnership	Not operational	CDMA	Oklahoma; shut down summer 2023; MNC withdrawn
310	370	Docomo	NTT DoCoMo Pacific	Operational	GSM 1900 / UMTS 850 / LTE 700	Guam, Northern Mariana Islands; former Guamcell
310	380	AT&T	AT&T Mobility	Not operational	GSM 850 / GSM 1900 / UMTS 850 / UMTS 1900	Former AT&T Wireless Services, then Cingular Wireless (known as "Cingular Blue")
310	390	Cellular One of East Texas	TX-11 Acquisition, LLC	Operational	GSM 850 / LTE 700 / CDMA	Former Yorkville Telephone Cooperative
310	400	IT&E Wireless	IT&E Overseas, Inc	Not operational	GSM 1900 / UMTS 1900 / LTE 700	Guam; former iConnect, Wave Runner LLC; MNC withdrawn
310	410	AT&T	AT&T Mobility	Operational	GSM 850 / GSM 1900 / UMTS 850 / UMTS 1900 / LTE 700 / LTE 850 / LTE 1700 / LTE 1900 / LTE 2300 / 5G 850 / 5G 3700 / 5G 39000	Formerly Cingular Wireless
310	420	World Mobile	World Mobile Networks, LLC	Operational	LTE 600 / TD-LTE 3500 CBRS	Former Cincinnati Bell (until Feb 2015);
310	430	GCI	GCI Communications Corp.	Operational	GSM 1900 / UMTS 1900	Former Alaska Digitel
310	440		Numerex	Operational	MVNO	Former Dobson / Cellular One; M2M only
310	450	Viaero	Viaero Wireless	Operational	UMTS 850 / UMTS 1900	Formerly North East Cellular Inc., CellONE; GSM shut down May 2018; Colorado / Kansas / Nebraska
310	460		Eseye LLC	Unknown	MVNO	Former Simmetry / TMP Corporation (shut down 30 June 2012), Conecto / NewCore Wireless LLC
310	470		NTT DoCoMo Pacific	Unknown	Unknown	Former Guam Wireless, nTelos, Shentel, Sprint
310	480	IT&E Wireless	PTI Pacifica Inc.	Operational	iDEN	Guam; former Choice Phone LLC, iConnect, Wave Runner LLC
310	490		T-Mobile	Not operational	GSM 850 / GSM 1900	Former Triton PCS, SunCom; GSM shut down Aug 2026
310	500	Alltel	Public Service Cellular Inc.	Operational	CDMA2000 850 / CDMA2000 1900	Georgia
310	510	Cellcom	Nsight	Unknown	Unknown	Formerly Airtel Wireless LLC (iDEN, Montana)
310	520	TNS	Transaction Network Services	Unknown	Unknown	Formerly Verisign
310	530		T-Mobile	Unknown	Unknown	Formerly West Virginia Wireless, iWireless
310	540	Phoenix	Hilliary Communications	Not operational	GSM 850 / GSM 1900	Oklahoma; MNC withdrawn
310	550		Syniverse Technologies	Unknown	Unknown	Former Wireless Solutions International
310	560	AT&T	AT&T Mobility	Not operational	GSM 850	Former Dobson Cellular, Cingular Wireless; MNC withdrawn
310	570		Broadpoint, LLC	Operational	GSM 850 / LTE 700	Former TX-10, LLC and Central Louisiana Cellular, LLC (MTPCS) dba Cellular One; Montana network (former Chinook Wireless) shut down in 2014
310	580		Inland Cellular Telephone Company	Not operational	CDMA	Former PCS One; CDMA shut down Sep 2025
310	590		Verizon Wireless	Unknown	GSM 850 / GSM 1900	Former Western Wireless Corporation, Alltel
310	591		Verizon Wireless	Unknown	Unknown	
310	592		Verizon Wireless	Unknown	Unknown	
310	593		Verizon Wireless	Unknown	Unknown	
310	594		Verizon Wireless	Unknown	Unknown	
310	595		Verizon Wireless	Unknown	Unknown	
310	596		Verizon Wireless	Unknown	Unknown	
310	597		Verizon Wireless	Unknown	Unknown	
310	598		Verizon Wireless	Unknown	Unknown	
310	599		Verizon Wireless	Unknown	Unknown	
310	600	Cellcom	NewCell Inc.	Not operational	CDMA 850 / CDMA 1900	Wisconsin; network shut down Dec 2023
310	610		Mavenir Systems Inc	Unknown	Unknown	Former Epic PCS, shut down 30 April 2015, sold to PTCI and United Wireless;
310	620	Cellcom	Nsighttel Wireless LLC	Unknown	Unknown	Formerly Coleman County Telecom
310	630	Choice Wireless	Commnet Wireless LLC	Unknown	Unknown	Former miSpot / Agri-Valley Communications
310	640		Numerex	Operational	MVNO	M2M only; formerly Einstein PCS, AirFire / Airadigm, shut down 2 September 2014
310	650	Jasper	Jasper Technologies	Operational	MVNO	M2M only
310	660	T-Mobile	T-Mobile USA, Inc.	Not operational	GSM 1900	Formerly DigiPhone PCS / DigiPH
310	670	AT&T	AT&T Mobility	Unknown	Unknown	Former Northstar
310	680	AT&T	AT&T Mobility	Operational	GSM 850 / GSM 1900	Formerly Cellular One DCS, NPI Wireless, Cingular
310	690	Limitless Mobile	Limitless Mobile, LLC	Operational	UMTS 1900 / LTE 1900	Pennsylvania; former Conestoga Wireless, Keystone Wireless d/b/a Immix Wireless
310	700	Bigfoot Cellular	Cross Valiant Cellular Partnership	Unknown	GSM	
310	710	ASTAC	Arctic Slope Telephone Association Cooperative	Operational	UMTS 850 / LTE	Alaska; GSM shut down January 2017
310	720		Syniverse Technologies	Unknown	Unknown	Former Wireless Solutions International
310	730	UScellular	United States Cellular Corporation	Not operational	Unknown	Formerly Sea Mobile; MNC withdrawn
310	740	Viaero	Viaero Wireless	Operational	LTE 700 / LTE 1700 / LTE 1900	Former Telemetrix Technologies, Convey Communications Inc., Green Eagle Communications, Inc.
310	750	Appalachian Wireless	East Kentucky Network, LLC	Not operational	CDMA 850 / CDMA 1900	shut down Feb 2023
310	760		Lynch 3G Communications Corporation	Not operational	Unknown	
310	770		T-Mobile	Unknown	Unknown	Former iWireless
310	780	Dispatch Direct	D. D. Inc.	Not operational	iDEN	Former Airlink PCS, Connect Net Inc.; MNC withdrawn
310	790	BLAZE	PinPoint Communications Inc.	Not operational	GSM 1900 / UMTS / LTE	Nebraska; discontinued Dec 2019
310	800		T-Mobile	Not operational	GSM 1900	Formerly SOL Communications
310	810		Pacific Lightwave Inc.	Unknown	1900	Formerly Brazos Cellular Communications Ltd., LCFR LLC (owned by New Dimension Wireless);
310	820		Verizon Wireless	Unknown	Unknown	Former South Canaan Cellular
310	830	T-Mobile	T-Mobile US	Operational	LTE 1900	Used for Direct to Cell on Band 25. Former Caprock Cellular (GSM, sold to AT&T in 2010), Clearwire, Sprint Corporation
310	840	telna Mobile	Telecom North America Mobile, Inc.	Operational	MVNO	Formerly Edge Mobile LLC
310	850	Aeris	Aeris Communications, Inc.	Operational	MVNO	M2M only; is a Full MVNO despite marketing claims to the contrary
310	860	Five Star Wireless	TX RSA 15B2, LP	Not operational	CDMA	Owned by West Central Wireless; shut down Aug 2023; MNC withdrawn
310	870	PACE	Kaplan Telephone Company	Not operational	GSM 850	Louisiana; spectrum sold to AT&T in 2014; MNC withdrawn
310	880	DTC Wireless	Advantage Cellular Systems, Inc.	Operational	LTE	Tennessee; owned by DeKalb Telephone Cooperative; fixed wireless only, GSM 850 discontinued January 2017
310	890		Verizon Wireless	Unknown	GSM 850 / GSM 1900	Former Unicel / Rural Cellular Corporation
310	891		Verizon Wireless	Unknown	Unknown	
310	892		Verizon Wireless	Unknown	Unknown	
310	893		Verizon Wireless	Unknown	Unknown	
310	894		Verizon Wireless	Unknown	Unknown	
310	895		Verizon Wireless	Unknown	Unknown	
310	896		Verizon Wireless	Unknown	Unknown	
310	897		Verizon Wireless	Unknown	Unknown	
310	898		Verizon Wireless	Unknown	Unknown	
310	899		Verizon Wireless	Unknown	Unknown	
310	900	Mid-Rivers Wireless	Cable & Communications Corporation	Not operational	CDMA 850 / CDMA 1900	Montana; network shut down August 2019; MNC withdrawn
310	910		Verizon Wireless	Unknown	GSM 850	Former First Cellular of Southern Illinois, Alltel
310	920		James Valley Wireless, LLC	Operational	CDMA	South Dakota; includes NVC
310	930		Copper Valley Wireless	Not operational	CDMA	Alaska; shut down Sep 2022
310	940		Tyntec Inc.	Unknown	MVNO	Formerly Poka Lambro Telecommunications Ltd., Iris Wireless LLC
310	950	AT&T	AT&T Mobility	Operational	GSM 850	Former Texas RSA 1 d/b/a XIT Cellular
310	960	STRATA	UBET Wireless	Not operational	CDMA	Utah; CDMA shut down Dec 2022
310	970		Globalstar	Operational	Satellite	
310	980	Peoples Telephone	Texas RSA 7B3	Not operational	CDMA / LTE 700	Texas; spectrum sold to AT&T; MNC withdrawn
310	990	Evolve Broadband	Evolve Cellular Inc.	Operational	LTE 700	LTE band 17; former Worldcall Interconnect Inc.
=== United States of America - US - 311 === 311	000	West Central Wireless	Mid-Tex Cellular Ltd.	Not operational	CDMA 850 / CDMA 1900	Texas; shut down Aug 2023; MNC withdrawn
311	010	Chariton Valley	Chariton Valley Communications	Not operational	CDMA 850 / CDMA 1900	Missouri; acquired by Verizon Wireless; CDMA shut down Dec 2022; MNC withdrawn
311	012	Verizon	Verizon Wireless	Not operational	CDMA 850 / CDMA 1900	CDMA shut down Dec 2022
311	020	Chariton Valley	Missouri RSA 5 Partnership	Not operational	GSM 850	Missouri; acquired by Verizon Wireless; MNC withdrawn
311	030	Indigo Wireless	Americell PA 3 Partnership	Not operational	GSM 850 / GSM 1900 / UMTS 850	Pennsylvania; shut down 2023
311	040	Choice Wireless	Commnet Wireless	Operational	GSM 850 / GSM 1900 / UMTS 850 / UMTS 1900	CDMA shut down Dec 2022; voice service discontinued
311	050		Thumb Cellular LP	Operational	CDMA2000 850	Michigan
311	060		Space Data Corporation	Operational	Unknown	Former Farmers Cellular Telephone Inc.
311	070	AT&T	AT&T Mobility	Operational	GSM 850	Former Easterbrooke Cellular Corporation, Wisconsin RSA #7 Limited Partnership
311	080	Pine Cellular	Pine Telephone Company	Operational	GSM 850 / LTE	Oklahoma
311	090	AT&T	AT&T Mobility	Operational	GSM 1900	Former Siouxland PCS, Long Lines Wireless, acquired by AT&T Dec. 2013
311	100		Nex-Tech Wireless	Operational	CDMA2000	Kansas; former High Plains Wireless L.P.
311	110	Verizon	Verizon Wireless	Unknown	Unknown	Former High Plains Wireless L.P., Alltel
311	120	IT&E Wireless	PTI Pacifica Inc.	Operational	Unknown	Guam; former Choice Phone LLC, iConnect, Wave Runner LLC
311	130		Black & Veatch	Not operational	Unknown	Former Cell One Amarillo (Amarillo License L.P.), Lightsquared; MNC withdrawn
311	140	Bravado Wireless	Cross Telephone Company	Operational	CDMA	Oklahoma; former MBO Wireless, Sprocket Wireless
311	150		Wilkes Cellular	Not operational	GSM 850	Georgia; MNC withdrawn
311	160		Lightsquared L.P.	Not operational	LTE	Former Endless Mountains Wireless (acquired by Dobson Cellular in 2005) MNC withdrawn
311	170		Tampnet	Operational	GSM 850 / LTE	Gulf of Mexico; former PetroCom, Broadpoint Inc.
311	180	AT&T	AT&T Mobility	Not operational	GSM 850 / UMTS 850 / UMTS 1900	Former Pacific Telesis, Cingular Wireless
311	190	AT&T	AT&T Mobility	Unknown	Unknown	Former Cellular Properties Inc.
311	200		Dish Wireless	Unknown	5G	Former ARINC
311	210		Telnyx LLC	Operational	MVNO	Former Farmers Cellular Telephone, Emery Telcom Wireless
311	220	UScellular	United States Cellular Corporation	Not operational	CDMA	MNC withdrawn
311	225	UScellular	T-Mobile US	Unknown	Unknown	
311	228	UScellular	T-Mobile US	Unknown	Unknown	
311	229	UScellular	T-Mobile US	Unknown	Unknown	
311	230	C Spire	Cellular South Inc.	Operational	LTE 700 / LTE 850 / LTE 1700 / LTE 1900 / TD-LTE 2500	CDMA shut down May 2022
311	240		Cordova Wireless	Operational	GSM / UMTS 850 / WiMAX	Alaska
311	250	IT&E Wireless	IT&E Overseas, Inc	Not operational	Unknown	Guam; former iConnect, Wave Runner LLC; MNC withdrawn
311	260	T-Mobile	T-Mobile US	Not operational	WiMAX	Former CellularOne of San Luis Obispo (sold to AT&T in 2010, Clearwire, Sprint Corporation
311	270	Verizon	Verizon Wireless	Unknown	Unknown	Former Alltel
311	271	Verizon	Verizon Wireless	Unknown	Unknown	Former Alltel
311	272	Verizon	Verizon Wireless	Unknown	Unknown	Former Alltel
311	273	Verizon	Verizon Wireless	Unknown	Unknown	Former Alltel
311	274	Verizon	Verizon Wireless	Unknown	Unknown	Former Alltel
311	275	Verizon	Verizon Wireless	Unknown	Unknown	Former Alltel
311	276	Verizon	Verizon Wireless	Unknown	Unknown	Former Alltel
311	277	Verizon	Verizon Wireless	Unknown	Unknown	Former Alltel
311	278	Verizon	Verizon Wireless	Unknown	Unknown	Former Alltel
311	279	Verizon	Verizon Wireless	Unknown	Unknown	Former Alltel
311	280	Verizon	Verizon Wireless	Unknown	Unknown	
311	281	Verizon	Verizon Wireless	Unknown	Unknown	
311	282	Verizon	Verizon Wireless	Unknown	Unknown	
311	283	Verizon	Verizon Wireless	Unknown	Unknown	
311	284	Verizon	Verizon Wireless	Unknown	Unknown	
311	285	Verizon	Verizon Wireless	Unknown	Unknown	
311	286	Verizon	Verizon Wireless	Unknown	Unknown	
311	287	Verizon	Verizon Wireless	Unknown	Unknown	
311	288	Verizon	Verizon Wireless	Unknown	Unknown	
311	289	Verizon	Verizon Wireless	Unknown	Unknown	
311	290	BLAZE	PinPoint Communications Inc.	Not operational	GSM 1900 / UMTS / LTE	Nebraska; discontinued Dec 2020; MNC withdrawn
311	300		Nexus Communications, Inc.	Not operational	Unknown	Former Rutal Cellular Corporation; MNC withdrawn
311	310	NMobile	Leaco Rural Telephone Company Inc.	Not operational	CDMA	New Mexico; shut down June 2018; MNC withdrawn
311	320	Choice Wireless	Commnet Wireless	Operational	GSM 850 / GSM 1900 / UMTS 850 / UMTS 1900	CDMA shut down Dec 2022
311	330	Bug Tussel Wireless	Bug Tussel Wireless LLC	Operational	GSM 1900 / LTE 1700 / WiMAX 3700	Wisconsin
311	340		Illinois Valley Cellular	Not operational	CDMA2000 / LTE 850	Illinois; network shut down Dec 2023
311	350	Nemont	Sagebrush Cellular, Inc.	Operational	CDMA2000	Former Torrestar Networks Inc.; Montana
311	360		Stelera Wireless	Not operational	UMTS 1700	shut down 30 April 2013
311	370	GCI Wireless	General Communication Inc.	Operational	LTE 1700	Former Alaska Communications
311	380		New Dimension Wireless Ltd.	Operational	MVNO	
311	390	Verizon	Verizon Wireless	Unknown	Unknown	Former Midwest Wireless Holdings LLC, Alltel
311	400			Unknown	Unknown	Former Salmon PCS LLC, New Cingular Wireless PCS LLC; for testing
311	410	Chat Mobility	Iowa RSA No. 2 LP	Not operational	CDMA	Iowa; MNC withdrawn
311	420	NorthwestCell	Northwest Missouri Cellular LP	Operational	CDMA	Missouri
311	430	Chat Mobility	RSA 1 LP	Unknown	CDMA	Former Cellular 29 Plus; acquired by Chat Mobility in 2009; Iowa
311	440		Verizon Wireless	Not operational	CDMA	Former Bluegrass Cellular; Kentucky
311	450	PTCI	Panhandle Telecommunication Systems Inc.	Operational	GSM 1900 / LTE 700	Also known as Panhandle Telephone Cooperative, Inc.; Oklahoma
311	460		Electric Imp Inc.	Not operational	Unknown	Former Fisher Wireless Services Inc.; MNC withdrawn
311	470	Viya	Vitelcom Cellular Inc.	Operational	GSM 850 / GSM 1900 / TD-LTE 2500	Former Innovative Wireless; US Virgin Islands
311	480	Verizon	Verizon Wireless	Operational	LTE 700	C Block
311	481	Verizon	Verizon Wireless	Not operational	LTE 700	C Block for future use
311	482	Verizon	Verizon Wireless	Not operational	LTE 700	C Block for future use
311	483	Verizon	Verizon Wireless	Not operational	LTE 700	C Block for future use
311	484	Verizon	Verizon Wireless	Not operational	LTE 700	C Block for future use
311	485	Verizon	Verizon Wireless	Not operational	LTE 700	C Block for future use
311	486	Verizon	Verizon Wireless	Not operational	LTE 700	C Block for future use
311	487	Verizon	Verizon Wireless	Not operational	LTE 700	C Block for future use
311	488	Verizon	Verizon Wireless	Not operational	LTE 700	C Block for future use
311	489	Verizon	Verizon Wireless	Not operational	LTE 700	C Block for future use
311	490	T-Mobile	T-Mobile US	Not operational	LTE 850 / LTE 1900 / TD-LTE 2500	Former Wirefree Partners LLC, acquired by Sprint in 2010; LTE bands 25, 26, 41 LTE shut down June 2022
311	500	mobi	mobi, Inc.	Unknown	Unknown	Former CTC Telecom Inc.; Mosaic Telecom discontinued cellular service in 2016;
311	510		Ligado Networks	Not operational	LTE	Former Benton-Lian Wireless, Lightsquared L.P.
311	520		Lightsquared L.P.	Not operational	LTE	Former Crossroads Wireless Inc.; MNC withdrawn
311	530		WorldCell Solutions LLC	Operational	LTE 1900	Former Wireless Communications Venture, NewCore Wireless LLC
311	540		Coeur Rochester, Inc	Unknown	Unknown	Former Keystone Wireless, Proximiti Mobility
311	550	Choice Wireless	Commnet Wireless LLC	Operational	GSM 850 / GSM 1900 / UMTS 850 / UMTS 1900	CDMA shut down Dec 2022
311	560	OTZ Cellular	OTZ Communications, Inc.	Operational	GSM 850	Alaska
311	570		Mediacom	Unknown	Unknown	Former BendBroadband, shut down 25-July-2014;
311	580	UScellular	T-Mobile US	Operational	LTE 700 / LTE 850 / 5G 600 / 5G 3700 / 5G 28000 / 5G 39000	
311	588	UScellular	T-Mobile US	Operational	Unknown	Used for IoT.
311	589	UScellular	T-Mobile US	Operational	Unknown	Used for IoT.
311	590	Verizon	Verizon Wireless	Unknown	Unknown	Former California RSA No3 Ltd Partnership d/b/a Golden State Cellular, acquired by Verizon in 2014
311	600	Limitless Mobile	Limitless Mobile, LLC	Operational	LTE 1900	Former Cox Wireless, shut down in 2012
311	610	SRT Communications	North Dakota Network Co.	Not operational	CDMA	North Dakota; shut down in 2017; MNC withdrawn
311	620		TerreStar Networks, Inc.	Not operational	Satellite	
311	630	C Spire	Cellular South Inc.	Unknown	Unknown	Former Corr Wireless Communications
311	640	Rock Wireless	Standing Rock Telecommunications	Operational	LTE 700	A Block; covering an American Indian reservation straddling remote parts of North and South Dakota
311	650	United Wireless	United Wireless	Operational	CDMA / LTE 700 / WiMAX 3700	Kansas
311	660	Metro	Metro by T-Mobile	Operational	MVNO	Former MetroPCS; CDMA2000 1900 / CDMA2000 1700 shut down in 2015; LTE 1700 merged with T-Mobile US
311	670	Pine Belt Wireless	Pine Belt Cellular Inc.	Operational	LTE 700	Alabama; CDMA shut down
311	680		GreenFly LLC	Unknown	GSM 1900	Iowa
311	690		TeleBEEPER of New Mexico	Operational	paging	New Mexico; 850 MHz band never used
311	700		Midwest Network Solutions Hub LLC	Not operational	MVNO	Former TotalSolutions Telecom LLC, Aspenta International, Inc.; MNC withdrawn
311	710		Northeast Wireless Networks LLC	Not operational	Unknown	MNC withdrawn
311	720		MainePCS LLC	Not operational	GSM 1900	Bankrupt in 2009
311	730		Proximiti Mobility Inc.	Not operational	GSM 850	Former Keystone Wireless; MNC withdrawn
311	740		Telalaska Cellular	Operational	GSM 850 / LTE	Alaska
311	750	ClearTalk	Flat Wireless LLC	Not operational	Unknown	Former NetAmerica Alliance; MNC withdrawn
311	760		Edigen Inc.	Not operational	Unknown	MNC withdrawn
311	770		Altiostar Networks, Inc.	Unknown	Unknown	Former Geneseo Communications Services Inc., Radio Mobile Access Inc.
311	780	ASTCA	American Samoa Telecommunications Authority	Operational	LTE 700	Former Cellular Network Partnership d/b/a Pioneer Cellular;
311	790		Coleman County Telephone Cooperative, Inc.	Unknown	Unknown	Former Cellular Network Partnership d/b/a Pioneer Cellular
311	800		Verizon Wireless	Operational	LTE 700	Former Bluegrass Cellular; Kentucky
311	810		Verizon Wireless	Operational	LTE 700	Former Bluegrass Cellular; Kentucky
311	820		Ribbon Communications	Unknown	Unknown	Former Kineto Wireless Inc, Sonus Networks
311	830		Thumb Cellular LP	Operational	LTE 700	Michigan
311	840	Cellcom	Nsight	Operational	LTE 700 / 5G 600 / 5G 850	Wisconsin
311	850	Cellcom	Nsight	Operational	LTE 700 / 5G 600 / 5G 850	Wisconsin
311	860	STRATA	Uintah Basin Electronic Telecommunications	Operational	LTE 700	Utah
311	870	T-Mobile	T-Mobile US	Unknown	MVNO	Former Sprint Corporation
311	880	T-Mobile	T-Mobile US	Unknown	Unknown	Former Sprint Corporation
311	882	T-Mobile	T-Mobile US	Operational	Unknown	Former Sprint Corporation
311	890		Globecomm Network Services Corporation	Unknown	Unknown	
311	900		GigSky	Operational	MVNO	
311	910	MobileNation	SI Wireless LLC	Not operational	CDMA / LTE	Tennessee; shut down Jan 2020; MNC withdrawn
311	920	Chariton Valley	Missouri RSA 5 Partnership	Not operational	Unknown	Missouri; acquired by Verizon Wireless; MNC withdrawn
311	930		Cox Communications	Not operational	Unknown 3500	Former Cablevision Systems Corporation, Syringa Wireless (shut down Dec 2015) MNC withdrawn
311	940	T-Mobile	T-Mobile US	Not operational	WiMAX	Former Clearwire, Sprint Corporation
311	950	ETC	Enhanced Telecommunications Corp.	Not operational	CDMA / LTE 700	Former Sunman Telecommunications Corp.; Indiana; fixed broadband; MNC withdrawn
311	960	Lycamobile	Lycamobile USA Inc.	Not operational	MVNO	used T-Mobile; MNC withdrawn
311	970	Big River Broadband	Big River Broadband, LLC	Operational	LTE 1700	Utilizing 20 MHz in A block
311	980		LigTel Communications	Not operational	Unknown	MNC withdrawn
311	990		VTel Wireless	Operational	LTE 700 / LTE 1700	
=== United States of America - US - 312 === 312	010	Chariton Valley	Chariton Valley Communications Corporation, Inc	Not operational	Unknown	Missouri; acquired by Verizon Wireless; MNC withdrawn
312	020		Infrastructure Networks, LLC	Operational	LTE 700	Focused on oil & gas industries
312	030	Bravado Wireless	Cross Wireless	Operational	LTE 700	Oklahoma; former MBO Wireless, Sprocket Wireless
312	040		Custer Telephone Co-op (CTCI)	Operational	LTE 700	Idaho
312	050		Fuego Wireless	Not operational	LTE 700	fixed broadband; New Mexico; shut down in 2016, spectrum sold to AT&T and Infrastructure Networks; MNC withdrawn
312	060		CoverageCo	Not operational	CDMA / GSM	Vermont MNC withdrawn
312	070		Adams Networks Inc	Not operational	LTE 700	C block fixed broadband; Illinois; MNC withdrawn
312	080	SyncSouth	South Georgia Regional Information Technology Authority	Operational	UMTS-TDD 700	LTE 700 planned
312	090	AT&T	AT&T Mobility	Unknown	Unknown	Former Allied Wireless
312	100		ClearSky Technologies, Inc.	Unknown	Unknown	
312	110		Texas Energy Network LLC	Not operational	LTE	MNC withdrawn
312	120	Appalachian Wireless	East Kentucky Network, LLC	Operational	LTE 700	
312	130	Appalachian Wireless	East Kentucky Network, LLC	Operational	LTE 700	
312	140	Revol Wireless	Cleveland Unlimited, Inc.	Not operational	CDMA	Shut down 2014, acquired by Sprint; MNC withdrawn
312	150	NorthwestCell	Northwest Missouri Cellular LP	Operational	LTE 700	Missouri
312	160	Chat Mobility	RSA1 Limited Partnership	Operational	LTE 700	Iowa
312	170	Chat Mobility	Iowa RSA No. 2 LP	Not operational	LTE 700	Iowa; MNC withdrawn
312	180		Limitless Mobile LLC	Operational	LTE 1900	Former Keystone Wireless LLC
312	190	T-Mobile	T-Mobile US	Operational	LTE 1900	Used for LTE Direct to Cell for 911 service for non-subscribers Former Sprint Corporation
312	200		Voyager Mobility LLC	Not operational	MVNO	Shut down 2015; MNC withdrawn
312	210		Aspenta International, Inc.	Operational	MVNO	
312	220	Chariton Valley	Chariton Valley Communications Corporation, Inc.	Not operational	LTE 700	acquired by Verizon Wireless; MNC withdrawn
312	230	SRT Communications	North Dakota Network Co.	Not operational	Unknown	North Dakota; shut down in 2017; MNC withdrawn
312	240	Sprint	Sprint Corporation	Not operational	Unknown	Former Clearwire; MNC withdrawn
312	250	T-Mobile	T-Mobile US	Not operational	LTE 850 / LTE 1900 / TD-LTE 2500	Former Clearwire, Sprint Corporation; LTE shut down June 2022
312	260		WorldCell Solutions LLC	Unknown	LTE 1900	Former NewCore, Central LTE Holdings
312	270	Pioneer Cellular	Cellular Network Partnership	Not operational	LTE 700	Oklahoma; shut down summer 2023; MNC withdrawn
312	280	Pioneer Cellular	Cellular Network Partnership	Not operational	LTE 700	Oklahoma; shut down summer 2023
312	290	STRATA	Uintah Basin Electronic Telecommunications	Unknown	Unknown	
312	300	telna Mobile	Telecom North America Mobile, Inc.	Operational	MVNO	
312	310		Clear Stream Communications, LLC	Operational	LTE 700	North Carolina; owned by Carolina West Wireless, Wilkes Communications
312	320		RTC Communications LLC	Operational	LTE 700	Indiana; former S and R Communications LLC
312	330	Nemont	Nemont Communications, Inc.	Operational	LTE 700	Montana
312	340	MTA	Matanuska Telephone Association, Inc.	Not operational	LTE 700	Alaska; MNC withdrawn
312	350		Triangle Communication System Inc.	Not operational	LTE 700	Montana; acquired by Verizon Wireless, shut down Dec 2021
312	360		Wes-Tex Telecommunications, Ltd.	Unknown	Unknown	Texas
312	370	Choice Wireless	Commnet Wireless	Operational	LTE 700 / LTE 1700	
312	380		Copper Valley Wireless	Operational	LTE 700	Alaska
312	390	FTC Wireless	FTC Communications LLC	Operational	UMTS / LTE	South Carolina; owned by Farmers Telephone Cooperative
312	400	Mid-Rivers Wireless	Mid-Rivers Telephone Cooperative	Not operational	LTE 700	Montana; network shut down August 2019; MNC withdrawn
312	410		Eltopia Communications, LLC	Unknown	Unknown	
312	420		Nex-Tech Wireless	Operational	LTE 700 / 5G 600	Kansas
312	430		Silver Star Communications	Operational	LTE 700	Wyoming; fixed wireless, CDMA shut down Dec 2022
312	440		Kajeet, Inc.	Unknown	Unknown	Former Consolidated Telcom
312	450		Cable & Communications Corporation	Unknown	Unknown	
312	460		Ketchikan Public Utilities (KPU)	Operational	LTE 700	Alaska
312	470	Carolina West Wireless	Carolina West Wireless	Operational	LTE 700	North Carolina; network to shut down 30 Sep 2026
312	480	Nemont	Sagebrush Cellular, Inc.	Unknown	Unknown	
312	490		TrustComm, Inc.	Not operational	Satellite	MNC withdrawn
312	500		AB Spectrum LLC	Not operational	LTE 700	MNC withdrawn
312	510		WUE Inc.	Unknown	LTE	Nevada; CDMA shut down
312	520		ANIN	Not operational	Unknown	MNC withdrawn
312	530	T-Mobile	T-Mobile US	Operational	Unknown	Former Sprint Corporation
312	540		Broadband In Hand LLC	Not operational	Unknown	MNC withdrawn
312	550		Great Plains Communications, Inc.	Not operational	Unknown	MNC withdrawn
312	560		NHLT Inc.	Not operational	MVNO	MNC withdrawn
312	570	Impact	MHG Telco LLC	Operational	Unknown	Former Buffalo-Lake Erie Wireless Systems
312	580		Google LLC	Unknown	Unknown	Former Shuttle Wireless Solutions Inc., Bingham McCutchen LLP, Morgan, Lewis & Bockius
312	590	NMU	Northern Michigan University	Operational	TD-LTE 2500	EBS Band (LTE band 41)
312	600	Nemont	Sagebrush Cellular, Inc.	Unknown	Unknown	
312	610		ShawnTech Communications	Not operational	Unknown	Former nTelos; MNC withdrawn
312	620		Airlinq Inc.	Operational	Unknown	Former Fogg Mobile, GlobeTouch
312	630		NetGenuity, Inc.	Unknown	Unknown	
312	640	Nemont	Sagebrush Cellular, Inc.	Not operational	Unknown	MNC withdrawn
312	650		Brightlink	Unknown	Unknown	Former 365 Wireless LLC
312	660	nTelos	nTelos Wireless	Not operational	LTE 1900	MNC withdrawn
312	670	FirstNet	AT&T Mobility	Operational	Unknown	
312	680	AT&T	AT&T Mobility	Unknown	Unknown	
312	690		Tecore Global Services, LLC	Operational	MVNO	
312	700		Wireless Partners, LLC	Operational	LTE 700	Maine
312	710		Great North Woods Wireless LLC	Operational	LTE	New Hampshire; former Wireless Partners, LLC
312	720	Southern LINC	Southern Communications Services	Operational	LTE 850	
312	730		Triangle Communication System Inc.	Not operational	CDMA	Montana; acquired by Verizon Wireless, shut down Dec 2021
312	740	Locus Telecommunications	KDDI America, Inc.	Unknown	MVNO	
312	750		Artemis Networks LLC	Unknown	Unknown	
312	760	ASTAC	Arctic Slope Telephone Association Cooperative	Not operational	Unknown	Alaska; MNC withdrawn
312	770	Verizon	Verizon Wireless	Unknown	Unknown	
312	780		Redzone Wireless	Operational	TD-LTE 2500	LTE band 41; Maine
312	790		Gila Electronics	Unknown	Unknown	
312	800		Cirrus Core Networks	Unknown	MVNO	
312	810	BBCP	Bristol Bay Telephone Cooperative	Not operational	CDMA / LTE	Alaska MNC withdrawn
312	820		Santel Communications Cooperative, Inc.	Not operational	Unknown	South Dakota; MNC withdrawn
312	830		Kings County Office of Education	Operational	WiMAX	California
312	840		South Georgia Regional Information Technology Authority	Unknown	Unknown	Georgia
312	850		Onvoy Spectrum, LLC	Unknown	MVNO	Former Emergency Networks LLC
312	860	ClearTalk	Flat Wireless, LLC	Not operational	CDMA / LTE 1900 / LTE 1700	Texas; MNC withdrawn
312	870		GigSky Mobile, LLC	Operational	MVNO	
312	880		Albemarle County Public Schools	Unknown	Unknown	
312	890		Circle Gx	Unknown	Unknown	
312	900	ClearTalk	Flat West Wireless, LLC	Operational	CDMA / LTE 1900 / LTE 1700	Arizona, California
312	910	Appalachian Wireless	East Kentucky Network, LLC	Unknown	Unknown	
312	920		Northeast Wireless Networks LLC	Not operational	Unknown	MNC withdrawn
312	930	HNI	Hewlett-Packard Communication Services, LLC	Unknown	Unknown	
312	940		Webformix	Not operational	Unknown	Oregon; MNC withdrawn
312	950		Custer Telephone Co-op (CTCI)	Operational	CDMA	Idaho
312	960		M&A Technology, Inc.	Not operational	Unknown	MNC withdrawn
312	970		IOSAZ Intellectual Property LLC	Unknown	Unknown	
312	980		Mark Twain Communications Company	Unknown	Unknown	
312	990	Premier Broadband	Premier Holdings LLC	Not operational	Unknown	MNC withdrawn
=== United States of America - US - 313 === 313	000		Tennessee Wireless	Not operational	Unknown	MNC withdrawn
313	010	Bravado Wireless	Cross Wireless LLC	Unknown	Unknown	Former Sprocket Wireless
313	020	CTC Wireless	Cambridge Telephone Company Inc.	Operational	CDMA	Idaho
313	030		AT&T Mobility	Unknown	Unknown	Former Snake River PCS
313	040	NNTC Wireless	Nucla-Naturita Telephone Company	Operational	CDMA	Colorado
313	050	Breakaway Wireless	Manti Tele Communications Company, Inc.	Not operational	CDMA	Utah; shut down 2018; MNC withdrawn
313	060		Country Wireless	Operational	Unknown	Wisconsin
313	061		Country Wireless	Unknown	Unknown	
313	070		Midwest Network Solutions Hub LLC	Unknown	Unknown	
313	080		Speedwavz LLP	Not operational	Unknown	Ohio; MNC withdrawn
313	090		Vivint Wireless, Inc.	Operational	Unknown	
313	100	FirstNet	AT&T FirstNet	Operational	LTE 700	D Block
313	110	FirstNet	AT&T FirstNet	Unknown	LTE	D Block
313	120	FirstNet	AT&T FirstNet	Unknown	LTE	D Block
313	130	FirstNet	AT&T FirstNet	Unknown	LTE	D Block
313	140	FirstNet	AT&T FirstNet	Unknown	LTE	D Block
313	150	FirstNet	700 MHz Public Safety Broadband	Unknown	LTE	D Block for future use
313	160	FirstNet	700 MHz Public Safety Broadband	Unknown	LTE	D Block for future use
313	170	FirstNet	700 MHz Public Safety Broadband	Unknown	LTE	D Block for future use
313	180	FirstNet	700 MHz Public Safety Broadband	Unknown	LTE	D Block for future use
313	190	FirstNet	700 MHz Public Safety Broadband	Unknown	LTE	D Block for future use
313	200		Mercury Network Corporation	Not operational	Unknown	Michigan; MNC withdrawn
313	210	AT&T	AT&T Mobility	Unknown	Unknown	
313	220		Custer Telephone Co-op (CTCI)	Unknown	Unknown	
313	230		Velocity Communications Inc.	Unknown	LTE	Montana
313	240	Peak Internet	Fundamental Holdings, Corp.	Not operational	Unknown	Colorado; MNC withdrawn
313	250		Imperial County Office of Education	Unknown	LTE	California
313	260		Expeto Wireless Inc.	Operational	MVNO	
313	270		Blackstar Management	Not operational	Unknown	MNC withdrawn
313	280		King Street Wireless, LP	Unknown	LTE 700	Fixed wireless; mobile service through U.S. Cellular
313	290		Gulf Coast Broadband LLC	Unknown	LTE	Fixed wireless; Louisiana
313	300		Southern California Edison	Unknown	Unknown	Former Cambio WiFi of Delmarva, LLC, Maryland
313	310		CAL.NET, Inc.	Not operational	Unknown	MNC withdrawn
313	320		Paladin Wireless	Unknown	LTE 3500	Fixed wireless; Georgia
313	330		CenturyTel Broadband Services LLC	Unknown	Unknown	
313	340	Dish	Dish Wireless	Operational	5G 600 / 5G 1700	
313	350	Dish	Dish Wireless	Not operational	Unknown	
313	360	Dish	Dish Wireless	Not operational	Unknown	
313	370		Red Truck Wireless, LLC	Unknown	Unknown	Fixed wireless
313	380		OptimERA Inc.	Unknown	Unknown	
313	390		Optimum Communications	Unknown	MVNO	Former Altice USA Wireless
313	400		Texoma Communications, LLC	Unknown	Unknown	
313	410		Anterix	Unknown	Unknown	Former pdvWireless
313	420		Hudson Valley Wireless	Unknown	TD-LTE 3500	CBRS fixed wireless; New York
313	440		Arvig Enterprises, Inc.	Not operational	Unknown	Minnesota; MNC withdrawn
313	450		Spectrum Wireless Holdings, LLC	Unknown	Unknown 3500	
313	460	mobi	mobi, Inc.	Not operational	5G 3500	CBRS; Hawaiʻi; CDMA network sold to Verizon in 2014; shut down Nov 2025
313	470		San Diego Gas & Electric Company	Unknown	Unknown	
313	480		Ready Wireless, LLC	Unknown	MVNO	
313	490		Puloli, Inc.	Unknown	Unknown	
313	500		Shelcomm, Inc.	Unknown	Unknown	
313	510	Claro	Puerto Rico Telephone Company	Operational	Unknown	
313	520		Florida Broadband, Inc.	Not operational	Unknown	Fixed wireless; Florida; MNC withdrawn
313	540		Nokia Innovations US LLC	Unknown	Unknown	
313	550		Mile High Networks LLC	Operational	Unknown	Fixed wireless; Arizona
313	560		Boldyn Networks US	Operational	LTE 3500 / 5G 3500	Private and neutral-host network; former Transit Wireless LLC
313	570	Pioneer Cellular	Cellular Network Partnership	Not operational	Unknown	shut down summer 2023; MNC withdrawn
313	580		Telecall Telecommunications Corp.	Unknown	Unknown	
313	590	Southern LINC	Southern Communications Services, Inc.	Unknown	Unknown	
313	600		ST Engineering iDirect	Not operational	Unknown	MNC withdrawn
313	610		Point Broadband Fiber Holding, LLC	Unknown	Unknown	Former Crystal Automation Systems, Inc.
313	620		OmniProphis Corporation	Unknown	Unknown 1700	Former Screened Images, Inc.
313	630		LICT Corporation	Unknown	Unknown	
313	640		Geoverse LLC	Unknown	LTE 3500	private networks
313	650		Chevron USA, Inc.	Unknown	Unknown	
313	660		Hudson Valley Wireless	Not operational	TD-LTE 3500	CBRS fixed wireless; New York; MNC withdrawn
313	670		Hudson Valley Wireless	Not operational	TD-LTE 3500	CBRS fixed wireless; New York; MNC withdrawn
313	680		Hudson Valley Wireless	Not operational	TD-LTE 3500	CBRS fixed wireless; New York; MNC withdrawn
313	690		Shenandoah Cable Television, LLC	Not operational	LTE	MNC withdrawn
313	700		Ameren Services Company	Unknown	800	
313	710		Extent Systems	Unknown	Unknown	
313	720		1st Point Communications, LLC	Unknown	Unknown	
313	730		TruAccess Networks	Unknown	Unknown	
313	740		RTO Wireless, LLC	Unknown	Unknown	
313	750	ZipLink	CellTex Networks, LLC	Unknown	Unknown	
313	760		Hologram, Inc.	Operational	MVNO	
313	770	Tango Extend	Tango Networks	Operational	MVNO	
313	780		Windstream Holdings	Unknown	Unknown 3500	
313	790	Liberty	Liberty Cablevision of Puerto Rico LLC	Operational	LTE 700 / LTE 850 / LTE 1700 / LTE 1900 / LTE 2300 / 5G 600 / 5G 850 / 5G 39000	Puerto Rico; UMTS shut down Feb 2022
313	800		Wireless Technologies of Nebraska	Not operational	Unknown	Nebraska, Iowa; MNC withdrawn
313	810		Watch Communications	Operational	LTE 3500	Illinois, Indiana, Kentucky & Ohio;
313	820		Inland Cellular Telephone Company	Operational	LTE	Washington, Idaho;
313	830		360 Communications	Unknown	Unknown	
313	840		CellBlox Acquisitions	Unknown	Unknown	
313	850		Softcom Internet Communications, Inc	Operational	LTE	California
313	860	Nextlink	AMG Technology Investment Group	Operational	Unknown 3500	
313	870		ElektraFi LLC	Operational	5G 3500	Texas
313	880		Shuttle Wireless	Unknown	Unknown	
313	890	TCOE	Tulare County Office of Education	Operational	Unknown	California
313	900		Tribal Networks	Unknown	Unknown	
313	910		San Diego Gas & Electric	Unknown	Unknown	
313	920		JCI	Unknown	Unknown	
313	930	Rock Wireless	Standing Rock Telecom	Operational	LTE 2500	North Dakota
313	940		Motorola Solutions	Unknown	Unknown	
313	950		Cheyenne and Arapaho Development Group	Unknown	2500	
313	960		Townes 5G, LLC	Unknown	Unknown	
313	970		Tychron	Unknown	Unknown	
313	980		Next Generation Application LLC	Not operational	Unknown	MNC withdrawn
313	990		Ericsson US	Unknown	Unknown	EEC/ATL Private Networks
=== United States of America - US - 314 === 314	010		Boingo Wireless Inc.	Unknown	Unknown	
314	020		Spectrum Wireless Holdings, LLC	Unknown	Unknown	
314	030		Baicells Technologies North America Inc.	Unknown	LTE	
314	060		Texas A&M University	Unknown	Unknown	RELLIS campus
314	070		Texas A&M University	Unknown	Unknown	RELLIS campus
314	080		Texas A&M University	Unknown	Unknown	RELLIS campus
314	090		Southern LINC	Unknown	Unknown	
314	100 - 190		Reserved for Public Safety	Unknown	Unknown	
314	200		XF Wireless Investments, LLC	Unknown	Unknown 3500	Owned by Comcast
314	210		Telecom Resource Center	Unknown	Unknown	
314	220		Securus Technologies	Unknown	Unknown	
314	230		Trace-Tek LLC	Unknown	Unknown	Use in correctional institutions
314	240		XF Wireless Investments, LLC	Unknown	Unknown 3500	Owned by Comcast
314	260		AT&T Mobility	Unknown	Unknown	
314	270		AT&T Mobility	Unknown	Unknown	
314	280		Pollen Mobile LLC	Unknown	Unknown	Former AT&T Mobility; private networks
314	290		Wave	Unknown	Unknown	
314	300		Southern California Edison	Unknown	Unknown	
314	310		Terranet	Unknown	Unknown	
314	320		Agri-Valley Communications, Inc	Unknown	Unknown	
314	330		Nova Labs Inc	Unknown	Unknown	Former FreedomFi
314	340	e/marconi	E-Marconi LLC	Unknown	MVNO	
314	350		Evergy	Unknown	Unknown	
314	360		Oceus Networks, LLC	Unknown	5G	private networks
314	370	ITEC	Texas A&M University	Unknown	Unknown	Internet2 Technology Evaluation Center
314	380	CCR	Circle Computer Resources, Inc.	Unknown	Unknown	
314	390		AT&T Mobility	Unknown	Unknown	
314	400	C Spire	Cellular South Inc	Unknown	Unknown	
314	410		Peeringhub Inc	Unknown	Unknown	
314	420		Cox Communications	Unknown	Unknown	
314	430		Highway9 Networks, Inc	Unknown	5G	
314	440		Tecore Global Services, LLC	Unknown	Unknown	
314	450		NUWAVE Communications, Inc.	Unknown	Unknown	
314	460		Texas A&M University	Unknown	Unknown	
314	470	MetTel	Manhattan Telecommunications Corporation LLC	Unknown	Unknown	
314	480		Xcel Energy Services Inc.	Unknown	Unknown	
314	490	UETN	Utah Education and Telehealth Network	Operational	TD-LTE 3500	CBRS
314	500		Aetheros Inc.	Unknown	Unknown	
314	510		SI Wireless LLC	Unknown	Unknown	
314	520	OG+E	Oklahoma Gas & Electric Company	Unknown	Unknown	
314	530		Agile Networks	Operational	Unknown	
314	540	RGTN	RGTN USA Inc.	Operational	Unknown	Used for two-way SMS services
314	550	REALLY	Really Communications	Operational	3G 3500	
314	560	Cape	Private Tech, Inc.	Unknown	Unknown	
314	570		Newmont Corporation	Unknown	Unknown	
314	580		Lower Colorado River Authority	Unknown	Unknown	
314	590		Lynk Global, Inc.	Operational	Satellite	
314	600		XNET Inc.	Unknown	Unknown	
314	610		IMSI.AI	Unknown	Unknown	
314	620		Memphis Light, Gas and Water	Not operational	Unknown	MNC withdrawn
314	630	Cape	Private Tech, Inc.	Unknown	Unknown	
314	640	Cape	Private Tech, Inc.	Unknown	Unknown	
314	650	Cape	Private Tech, Inc.	Unknown	Unknown	
314	660	Cape	Private Tech, Inc.	Unknown	Unknown	
314	670		Wi-DAS LLC	Unknown	Unknown	
314	680	Xfinity	Comcast OTR1 LLC	Operational	MVNO	
314	690		Agri-Valley Communications, Inc.	Unknown	Unknown	
314	700		Tampa Electric Company	Unknown	Unknown	
314	710		Tribal Ready, PBC	Unknown	Unknown	
314	720		OXIO, Inc.	Unknown	MVNO	
314	730		TextNow, Inc.	Operational	MVNO	
314	740		Ringer Mobile, LLC	Unknown	Unknown	
314	750		SDF, Inc.	Unknown	Unknown	
314	760	BATS Wireless	Broadband Antenna Tracking Systems, Inc.	Unknown	5G	
314	770		Westbold LLC	Unknown	Unknown	
314	780		Saint Regis Mohawk Tribe	Unknown	Unknown	
314	790		Neuner Mobile Technologies LLC	Unknown	MVNO	
314	800		Boost Network	Unknown	Unknown	
314	810	ORCID	Open RAN Center for Integration and Deployment	Unknown	Unknown	
314	820		Sequoia Wireless LLC	Operational	MVNO	
314	830		Talkie Communications	Operational	MVNO	
314	840	MLGW	Memphis Light, Gas and Water	Unknown	Unknown	
314	850	SpaceX	Space Exploration Technologies Corp.	Unknown	Unknown	
314	860		Exelon	Unknown	Unknown	
314	870		Exelon	Unknown	Unknown	
314	880		Oncor License Holdings Company, LLC	Unknown	Unknown	
314	890		Central Council of the Tlingit & Haida Indian Tribes of Alaska	Unknown	Unknown	
314	900		Inland Cellular Telephone Company	Unknown	Unknown	
=== United States of America - US - 315 === 315	010	CBRS	Citizens Broadband Radio Service	Unknown	TD-LTE 3500	LTE band 48
=== United States of America - US - 316 === 316	010	Nextel	Nextel Communications	Not operational	iDEN 800	Merged with Sprint forming Sprint Nextel; iDEN network shut down June 2013; MNC withdrawn
316	011	Southern LINC	Southern Communications Services	Not operational	iDEN 800	shut down 2019; MNC withdrawn
316	700		Mile High Networks LLC	Not operational	Unknown	Arizona; MNC withdrawn

==== United States Virgin Islands (United States of America) – VI ====
MCC	MNC	Brand	Operator	Status	Bands (MHz)	References and notes
310	120	T-Mobile	T-Mobile US	Not operational	LTE 850 / LTE 1900	Former Sprint Corporation; CDMA shut down May 2022
310	260	T-Mobile	T-Mobile US	Operational	GSM 1900 / UMTS 1900 / UMTS 1700 / LTE 850 / LTE 700 / LTE 1900 / LTE 1700 / 5G 600	Former Cook Inlet West Wireless, Voicestream; now universal USA code. Also used for Ting.
313	790	Liberty	Liberty	Operational	GSM 850 / GSM 1900 / UMTS 850 / UMTS 1900 / 5G 850	Formerly AT&T Mobility, Cingular Wireless
311	470	Viya	Vitelcom Cellular Inc.	Operational	GSM 850 / GSM 1900 / TD-LTE 2500	Former Innovative Wireless; US Virgin Islands

== See also ==
- List of mobile network operators of the Americas
- List of LTE networks in the Americas
