= Nokia 1006 =

Mobile phone model

- Manufacturer: Nokia
- First released: January 2009
- Compatible networks: CDMA, 800, 1700, 2100, 1900 MHz
- Form factor: Candybar
- Dimensions: H: 108 mm (4.3 in); W: 44 mm (1.7 in); D: 13.5 mm (0.53 in)
- Weight: 76 g (2.7 oz)
- Operating system: Series 40
- Memory: 8 MB of internal storage Phone Book Memory: 500 contacts
- Removable storage: Not supported
- Battery: 860 mAh, Li-Ion; Talktime: 3.5h (210 min); Standby: 240h (10 days)
- Rear camera: Absent
- Display: LCD 1.8" display; TFT/TFD (262K colors - 18 bit); Resolution 128 x 160px (~137 ppi)
- Connectivity: Bluetooth v2.0, USB, microUSB
- Data inputs: Numeric keypad, Soft keys
- Development status: Discontinued

The Nokia 1006 is a phone with a basic design for CDMA Technology. It was announced on 8 January 2009 and was released in the same month, marketing in Mexico by Iusacell and mostly in the USA by MetroPCS. This bar-style mobile has Bluetooth features, voice dialing and also has a GPS (Grand Positioning System) of A-GPS type.

== Features ==
The phone has a 1.8 inches LCD TFT/TFD color display. Its 860mAh removable Li-ion battery gives a battery backup of 240 h maximum in standby mode and 3.5 h maximum in talktime mode. MicroUSB and a headset jack of 2.5 mm is supported by the device. The software feature BREW in the mobile allows external games and applications to be downloaded. Speaker-dependent voice dialing is also supported by the mobile. The phone also has volume keys in its side which makes it easy to adjust volume. The input is through numeric keypad and soft keys. It also has the feature of Predictive Text Input. The SAR head is 1.46 W/kg and that of body is 0.35 W/kg.

== Data, Network, Connectivity ==
The phone has a support to flight mode. It also supports GPRS, WAP v2.0, WEB. It also supports High Speed Data technology. Connectivity is through Bluetooth v2.0, USB and microUSB. The phone has place for mini-SIM. The microUSB port supports charging.

== Multimedia ==
The phone has support for custom ringtones and custom graphics. This phone is a speakerphone, music can be played both through the 2.5 mm jack and the built-in speaker.

== Pre-Installed Apps ==
Games (only 1 game, Planet Puzzle, is pre-installed) and other applications like Alarm, Calculator, Calendar, Currency Converter, Watch, Stopwatch and Profiles are pre-installed on this Nokia model. The phone supports Java MIDP v2.0.

== See also ==
- List of Nokia products
