= IConnect Guam =

Choice Phone LLC (also known as iConnect Guam, iCan GSM, and Wave Runner LLC) was a telecommunications company. IConnect Guam also serves Saipan, Rota and Tinian. On September 22, 2020, IT&E sign a deal that which acquired iConnect's assets, including its wireless network.

== Technologies ==
Technology	Brand Name	Remarks
iDEN	Instant Connect Push-To-Talk	
GSM/GPRS 1900 MHz	Buddy GSM / iCan GSM	
UMTS/HSPA+ 1900 MHz (band 2)	iConnect Advanced	downlink 21 Mbit/s
LTE 700 MHz (band 12)	iConnect LTE True 4G	
