= United Wireless =

Coordinates: 37.7333°N 100.0291°W

- Headquarters: Dodge City, Kansas
- Website: unitedwireless.com

United Wireless is a cellular telecommunications company in the United States, based in Dodge City, Kansas. United Wireless is a wholly owned subsidiary of United Telephone Association, Inc., a telecommunications cooperative founded in 1951. In 2005, United Wireless Communications, Inc. was started as a way of bringing the latest cellular technology to residents and businesses in the Southwest Kansas region. United Wireless sponsors many organizations and community events in Southwest Kansas, and is a title sponsor of the Hi-Plains League High School Basketball Tournament, as well as a major sponsor of the SPIAA League Basketball Tournament.

In December 2014, EpicTouch of Elkhart announced that it would sell its Kansas cellular operations to United Wireless. It is a sponsor of the 2015 Pancake Day Talent Show in Liberal, Kansas.

United Wireless is the naming rights sponsor of United Wireless Arena in Dodge City, Kansas.

== Unrelated British company ==
An unrelated company with the same name in the United Kingdom was purchased in 2014 by Stadium Group, Hartlepool, United Kingdom.
