= WorldCell =

American provider of international mobile service

WorldCell Inc.
- Type: Privately owned
- Industry: Telecommunications
- Founded: 1996 as International Mobile Communication, Inc.
- Founder: Blake Swensrud, Chairman
- Headquarters: Washington DC metro area
- Website: www.worldcell.com

WorldCell is an American-based corporation that provides international mobile service to federal agencies, international businesses, and individual travelers.

== History ==
WorldCell was formed in 1996. The privately owned company was founded by Blake Swensrud as International Mobile Communications, Inc., and began primarily as a retail mobile phone service, renting international cell phones to travelers, businesses, and relief organizations.

After September 11 and the advent of the wars in Afghanistan and Iraq, WorldCell shifted its focus to providing wireless management services to corporations, federal agencies, and the US military, transitioning its rental service to its TravelComm division. It later added satellite phones and service to its list of products, enabling its customers to communicate from remote locations.

In 2002, IMC Inc launched the Viking Wireless GSM network through its subsidiary IMC Ísland ehf, officially categorizing the company as a carrier (as opposed to a "reseller"). In 2005 the company was re-branded as WorldCell. Shortly after, Worldcell signed a five-year purchasing contract with the Army's Information Technology, E-Commerce, and Commercial Contracting Center (ITEC4)- West Two years later, in 2007, WorldCell signed several agreements with international mobile technology companies, such as Aicent, Inc and Accuris Networks.

WorldCell currently administers managed wireless services and secure data plans to the federal government, including the military, and commercial organizations, using agreements with overseas carriers such as Vodafone, O2, KPN, and Docomo.

WorldCell's headquarters are in Rockville, Maryland, a few miles outside of Washington, D.C. In addition to its corporate headquarters, WorldCell has offices in Reykjavík, Iceland and Tokyo, Japan.

== Subsidiaries ==
WorldCell is the parent company of three additional entities: TravelComm, IMC Ísland, and Alterna.

TravelComm is a retail service that rents cell phones to United States customers traveling abroad. TravelComm's services are used by international business travelers, vacationers, and college students studying abroad. TravelComm has recently added US Domestic service to its list of products.

IMC Ísland is a licensed Iceland-based mobile operator. IMC uses the Viking Wireless GSM network and has access to multiple international GSM networks. WorldCell is able to offer international wireless service through IMC's networks, as well as through roaming agreements and SIM cards.

IMC Ísland launched Alterna Telecom, a new company that provides mobile service to local users in Iceland, in late 2009. IMC and Alterna also announced that they will be cooperating with Síminn, a mobile provider with the largest 3G network in Iceland. Alterna began testing its service with a group of beta customers in 2009 and transitioned these trial subscriptions to paid plans in 2010.
