= Liberty Puerto Rico =

Telecommunications company in Puerto Rico

Liberty Communications of Puerto Rico LLC

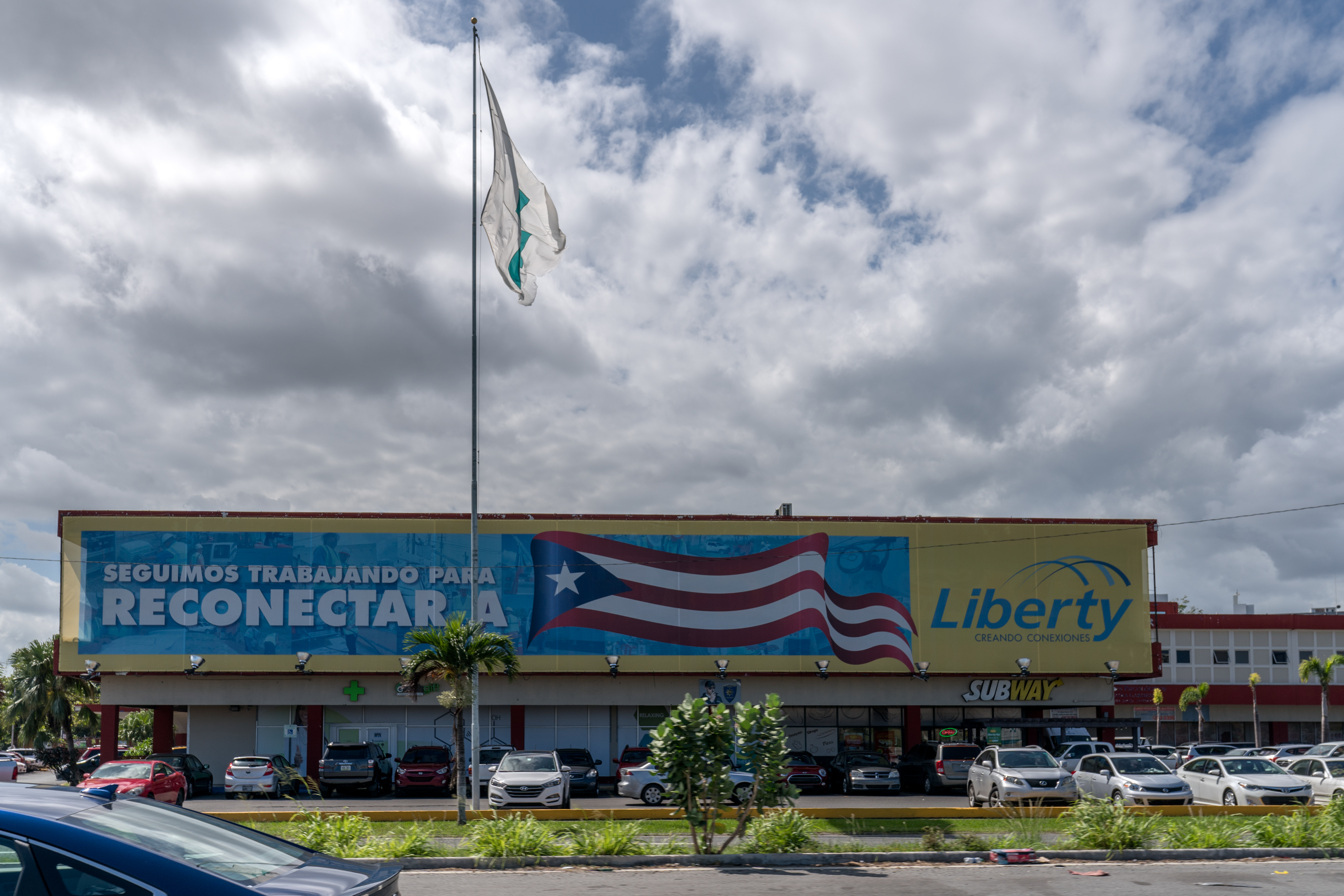
- Liberty cable reconstruction sign in San Juan, Puerto Rico after 2017 Hurricane Maria
- Trade name: Liberty
- Type: Private
- Industry: Telecommunications
- Predecessors: Cable TV of Greater San Juan; Adelphia Puerto Rico; OneLink Communications; TCI Cable Puerto Rico; Puerto Rico Cable Acquisition; Pegasus Cable TV; Centennial Cable TV; Choice Cable TV; AT&T Mobility Puerto Rico
- Founded: 1999; 27 years ago
- Headquarters: San Juan, Puerto Rico
- Area served: Puerto Rico; U.S. Virgin Islands (mobile telephony only)
- Services: Broadband; Telephone; Television; Mobile telephony
- Owner: Liberty Latin America
- Website: www.libertypr.com

Liberty Communications of Puerto Rico LLC (d/b/a Liberty) is a telecommunications company that provides broadband Internet access, VoIP, television, and wireless services covering the entire island of Puerto Rico and the U.S. Virgin Islands. The company is headquartered in San Juan and has over a million television subscribers and over 1 million data customers.

== History ==
Liberty Puerto Rico was created in 1999, replacing TCI Cable.

During its existence as OneLink Communications, the company was owned by MidOcean Partners and Crestview Partners, which paid $250 million in June 1998 to buy the property from Adelphia. On June 25, 2012, it was rumored that Liberty Global might buy OneLink for $560 million USD. The rumors proved true, as Liberty Global acquired Onelink.

Liberty announced on December 27, 2012, that OneLink customers would no longer have a capped Internet; the previous limit was 40 GB per month, and it is now unlimited. Naji Khoury, executive director of Liberty Puerto Rico, said, "The use of the Internet has increased significantly in Puerto Rico and having access to it easy and rapidly has become a necessity in the daily life of Puerto Ricans."

On November 7, 2013, Liberty Puerto Rico announced that it would phase out the OneLink Communications brand, as well as the Choice Cable TV brand in November 2013, replacing it with Liberty. The same day, the company introduced a new logo.

It is wholly owned by Liberty Latin America following the split of Liberty Latin America from Liberty Global effective December 29, 2017 and the acquisition of the remaining 40% minority stake from Searchlight Capital partners on October 17, 2018.

On October 9, 2019, Liberty Cablevision of Puerto Rico's parent company (Liberty Latin America), announced the acquisition of AT&T Wireless Services in Puerto Rico and the U.S. Virgin Islands, in a $1.95 billion deal. The sale was completed on October 31, 2020. In May 2021, the company began promoting AT&T and Liberty as a unified brand. On September 3, 2021, customers' phones began to show Liberty instead of AT&T as their network provider. By September 27, the AT&T brand was fully phased out, coinciding with the introduction of a new logo for the company. All AT&T stores in the island were rebranded to Liberty as well.

== Internet service upgrade history ==
- In March 2013, OneLink Communications began offering Internet speeds up to 10 Mbit/s download and 1 Mbit/s upload.
- In May 2013, OneLink Communications began offering Internet speeds up to 20 Mbit/s download and 2 Mbit/s upload.
- In June 2013, Onelink Communications began offering Internet speeds up to 40 Mbit/s download and 2 Mbit/s upload.
- As of 2021, the fastest Internet speeds offered by Liberty Puerto Rico are 600 Mbit/s download and 30 Mbit/s upload.
- In 2023, Liberty announced that it will start offering internet speeds up to 1,000 Mbit/s download to its customers, making its fastest internet speed offering 1,000 Mbit/s download and 30 Mbit/s upload.
