= Cellcom (United States) =

Service provider for Wisconsin

- Type: Private
- Industry: Telecommunications
- Founded: 1987; 39 years ago
- Headquarters: Howard, Wisconsin, USA
- Products: 5G, 4G LTE, SMS (text messaging), MMS (picture messaging), iPhone, Android
- Parent: Nsight
- Website: cellcom.com

Cellcom (officially called New-Cell Inc. dba Cellcom) is a regional Wireless service provider based in Howard, Wisconsin, with roots that date back to 1910. Cellcom began providing service from its office in Green Bay in 1987, when its parent company, Nsight, entered the wireless industry.

== History ==
Cellcom's parent company, Nsight, was founded on March 10, 1910, when a group of Pulaski business people met at the local drug store to discuss providing telephone service to their growing community. From that meeting, the Pulaski Merchants and Farmers Telephone Company formed.

In 1968 the company's name changed to Northeast Telephone Company. Northeast Communications, Inc. was formed as a holding company in 1982, and Northeast Telephone Company became a subsidiary. In 1999, Northeast Communications of Wisconsin, Inc. began doing business as Nsight. Today, Nsight's subsidiaries include Cellcom, Nsight Telservices and Nsight Tower.

Nsight has been a family-run business since 1923.

== 2025 Service Outage ==
On the evening of Wednesday, May 14, 2025 Cellcom's network went down, and it included their call center phones as well. In the evening Cellcom first put out a message on social media acknowledging the outage.

On Thursday, May 15, 2025 in the morning Cellcom updated their outage to confirm that SMS services were also down, however did say that Data, iMessaging, and RCS messaging was unaffected. They stated that 911 emergency services continued to be available.

On Thursday, May 15, 2025 Cellcom created their Service Announcement Page regular communication to provide an official record of all communications about the outage, and provide ongoing updates.

On Thursday, May 15, 2025 Cellcom said " What initially appeared to be a short-term problem has become a more complex challenge, requiring additional time to resolve." indicating that the outage would be on going.

On Friday, May 16, 2025 Cellcom announced the following message on the newly created Service page (cellcom.com/service), which documents all messages about the outage.

"We know we missed our midday update — and we’re sorry for the delay. We said we’d share more today, and we’re here to do just that.”

Cellcom continues, “A portion of our voice services has been successfully restored, marking an important milestone in our recovery efforts. While this update may not yet impact all customers, it is a meaningful step forward — and a sign of the real momentum happening behind the scenes. Activations are continuing in real time as restoration work progresses. We know this isn’t enough. Full restoration remains our top priority, and while we still can’t provide a firm timeline, progress is steady and significant. Our teams continue working 24/7 to bring everyone back online.”

They finish by stating, “This isn’t just about returning to service — it’s about making things right. We are committed to earning back your trust and will share more soon on how we plan to support and stand by our customers through this."

In the following messages sent out by Cellcom, they continued to emphasize they have restored some voice services, and no customer data was compromised. Based on the latest update on May 17, 2025 at 1:15PM, most lines of service have not been restored yet, and they continue to say there is no estimated time for full service restoration.

On May 19, 2025 Cellcom restored SMS and internal (Cellcom to Cellcom) calling.

On May 20, 2025, Cellcom/Nsight CEO Brighid Riordan released a YouTube video and written statement saying that the outage was due to a "security incident", alluding to that their voice and SMS systems were either hacked or subject to ransomware. She does not know when full services will be restored.

On May 27, 2025 Cellcom was able to restore SMS and internal and external calling for customers.

On May 30, 2025 Cellcom announced that they will be automatically crediting accounts for the outage, and for eligible customers, would be doing a "Double the Downtime" offer to receive a second credit for the outage.

== Green cell sites ==
The first alternative energy cell site in the upper Midwest, built in Ackley, Wis. and activated on April 22, 2008, delivers wireless service to an area that previously had many dead zones.

Equipment for the green cell site underwent rigorous testing prior to installation and features multiple backups to ensure continuity of service. The primary source of energy for this site is sunlight collected using a 6.3 kilowatt solar panel array. The energy gathered from the sun is converted into electricity and stored in batteries. The cell site draws energy for operation from these batteries. On dark or cloudy days, energy generated by a windmill supplements the solar power to maintain operation. A hydrogen fuel cell serves as a backup for both of these energy producers. The final backup is a diesel generator that can be hooked up to maintain service if all other power sources fail.

In 2010, Cellcom converted the Ackley site to a grid-tie location, and it now feeds the extra energy produced from the solar panels and wind turbine back to the power company and, in turn, became even more efficient.

A second green cell site was activated in 2009 on Chambers Island in Door County. The cliffs lining Door County's rugged shoreline were blocking the signals from mainland towers, leaving many area residents with limited cellular service, as well as leaving emergency personnel with limited radio coverage. The green cell site runs on batteries charged by solar panels at the base of the tower and a wind turbine installed on tower. A propane generator is available as a back-up source of power if there is inadequate wind or sun to charge the batteries.

== Femtocells ==
Cellcom was the first CDMA carrier in the U.S. to be a member of the non-profit organization founded in 2007 to promote worldwide femtocell deployment. Femto technology offers a low cost and highly effective solution to dead zones, particularly in small areas such as a home. In addition, a femtocell offers higher data rates, better voice quality and improved multi-media experiences.

In 2009, Cellcom received the first Femtocell Industry Award for significant progress or commercial launch by a small carrier at the Femtocells World Summit in London.

== Network ==
Frequency bands used on the Cellcom Network
Frequency Band	Band Number	Protocol	Generation	Status	Notes
700 MHz	12	LTE	4G	Active/built out	
700 MHz	13	LTE	4G	Active/built out	
1.7/2.1 GHz AWS	4/66	LTE	4G	Active	
1.9 GHz	2	LTE	4G	Active	
3.5 GHz CBRS	48	LTE	4G	Active	
850 MHz CLR	n5	NR	5G	Active/building out	
1.9 GHz PCS	n2	NR	5G	Active/building out	
2.5 GHz C-Band	n41	NR	5G	Active/building out	
28 GHz Ka-Band	n261	NR	5G	Active/building out	Branded as "5G+", these are the mmWave bands.

Cellcom is a Verizon LTE in Rural America (LTEiRA) partner. Through this partnership, customers of both carriers will benefit from the high-speed, fourth-generation long-term evolution (LTE) services.

Cellcom has access to Verizon Wireless's extensive 700 MHz and AWS 1 spectrum holdings for use on their network.

Cellcom has made plans to extend its 4G LTE infrastructure into almost all of its existing 3G CDMA network during 2016.

In 2020 Cellcom introduced Voice over LTE and the ability to use 4G LTE data while talking on the phone, which they market as Advanced Calling.

Cellcom first started offering 5G along with Wi-Fi calling with a new SIM card in 2023. By 2024 Cellcom increased their 5G area, and worked with Verizon, to offer 5G to customers nation wide.

In 2023 Cellcom shutdown their 3G CDMA network, and shut down their 2G CMDA network on December 4, 2024.

== Other awards ==
Cellcom and its parent company Nsight were recognized in 2009 as the business recipient of the Brown County Ethics in Business Awards.

== Spokespeople ==
The company has generally utilized head coaches and executives of the NFL's Green Bay Packers as their spokespeople, although due to Verizon's official wireless provider sponsorship with the league (along with the Packers having a gate provider sponsorship at Lambeau Field with Verizon, and an additional sponsorship with U.S. Cellular for stadium wi-fi and a showplace store in the stadium atrium), the team's logos and names cannot be used nor mentioned, and generic green and gold clothing is worn in ads instead.

Mike Holmgren was the first Cellcom spokesman from 1996 to 1999, followed by team president Ron Wolf in 2000, and Mike Sherman from 2002 to 2005. Mike McCarthy was featured in team advertising until departing the Packers in 2018, where McCarthy would come into situations and throw a challenge flag in situations where Cellcom was then compared more favorably to the national providers. In the fall of 2019, current Packers coach Matt LaFleur began to endorse the company in advertising.

The company has had two departures from Packer figures as spokesmen; Eli Mattson, a third runner-up in season three of NBC's America's Got Talent, promoted the brand from 2009 until 2010. With McCarthy's departure, the company had a more general advertising campaign promoting its locally based customer support, with Cellcom call center agents in their ads using local landmarks and songs to remind customers that they're based in northeastern Wisconsin.
