= West Central Wireless =

Mobile phone provider

- Type: Private
- Industry: Wireless Services
- Founded: 1987
- Headquarters: San Angelo, Texas, U.S.
- Website: West Central Wireless

West Central Wireless was a local mobile phone provider serving Central and West Texas based in San Angelo, Texas, until their acquisition by Verizon Wireless in 2023.

== History ==
Their cellular services consisted of 850 MHz HSPA+ and GSM networks and an overlaid 700 MHz (lower A and B blocks, 10x10 MHz) LTE network. The HSPA+ network began rollout in early 2012. CDMA services (1xRTT only) once existed due to the acquisition of Five Star Wireless, offering wholesale roaming to service providers, though services were discontinued in 2019.

In some areas, West Central Wireless utilized AWS-1 (Band 4) spectrum for LTE. They also owned 7.5x7.5 MHz of PCS (1900 MHz) spectrum in their original service area, as well as some 2.5 GHz (BRS/EBS) licenses. Finally, they owned 10x10 MHz of 600 MHz (Band 71) spectrum in most of their service area (excluding the SE corner originally served by Five Star Wireless).

T-Mobile had a roaming agreement with West Central Wireless, allowing T-Mobile postpaid customers to use West Central's networks (GSM, HSPA, LTE) for voice, SMS, and data, with some prepaid brands (e.g. Boost Mobile) also able to access at least voice and SMS.

West Central's network provided native service in the following twenty-six counties of West Texas: Tom Green, Howard, Glasscock, Reagan, Crockett, Sterling, Irion, Schleicher, Sutton, Coke, Edwards, Runnels, Concho, Menard, Kimble, Kerr, Coleman, McCulloch, Mason, Gillespie, Kendall, Brown, San Saba, Mills, Comanche, Erath through tower microwave backhaul. As its parent company served as a last-mile provider in parts of the region, an extensive project to provide fiber backhaul was completed in order to provide further expanded and competitive LTE features.

The company offered prepaid service on their GSM network through the Right Wireless brand. It provided fixed wireless services using LTE technology on the 700 MHz band marketed under the West Central Net brand.

Through roaming agreements with other companies including AT&T Mobility, T-Mobile USA, and Verizon, West Central was able to provide their customers with service when outside their home coverage area, albeit with significantly reduced minute and data allotments compared to what the company made available within their own service area.

The companies operating under the West Central Wireless umbrella had a somewhat convoluted legal structure (d/b/a meaning "doing business as"):

- CGKC&H #2 Rural Partnership d/b/a West Central Wireless and d/b/a Right Wireless
- CT Cube, L.P. d/b/a West Central Wireless and d/b/a Right Wireless
- Mid-Tex Cellular, Ltd.
- Texas RSA 15B2, L.P. d/b/a Five Star Wireless and d/b/a Right Wireless

On 31 August 2023, all wireless networks were shut down, following the acquisition of West Central Wireless by Verizon Wireless in May 2023.
