= Docomo Pacific =

Telecommunications company in Guam and the Northern Mariana Islands

Docomo Pacific, Inc.
- Industry: Telecommunications
- Headquarters: Tamuning, Guam, U.S.
- Area served: Guam, Northern Mariana Islands
- Key people: Christine Baleto (President & CEO)
- Products: Mobile, Television, Internet, Telephone
- Parent: NTT Docomo
- Website: www.docomopacific.com

Docomo Pacific is a wholly owned subsidiary of Japanese mobile phone operator NTT Docomo headquartered in Tamuning, Guam. It is the largest provider of mobile, television, internet and telephone services to the United States territories of Guam and the Northern Mariana Islands.

The company was formed through the merger of cell phone carriers Guamcell Communications and HafaTel and was acquired in December 2006 by NTT Docomo, a spin-off of Japanese communication company Nippon Telegraph and Telephone. In October 2008, Docomo Pacific was the first company on Guam to introduce a HSDPA network. In November 2011, Docomo Pacific launched 4G HSPA+ service on Guam followed by the launch of advanced 4G LTE service in October 2012.

In May 2013, Docomo Pacific acquired cable company MCV Broadband (Marianas Cable Vision Broadband) from Seaport Capital, an investment company based in New York City.

== Incidents ==
=== March 17, 2023 ===
A cyberattack occurred early in the morning, disabling access to Docomo's call hotline center, website, and internet services.

Immediate failsafe protocols were initiated by Docomo's cybersecurity technicians, shutting down the affected servers and isolating the intrusion.

Docomo subscribers still had access to the mobile network, as well voice, SMS, and fiber internet services. Subscribers of other telecommunication companies were not affected.

Docomo Pacific posted the updates on their Facebook page, due to their website being offline. After March 17th, they returned to their normal schedule.

Some Docomo internet services were restored the following day in parts of Guam, while other villages remained without service. By the end of the day, internet access had resumed across most areas of the island.

== See also ==
- Communications in Guam
- List of mobile network operators in the United States
