= SRT Communications =

Telecommunications cooperative in North Dakota, US

- Company type: Cooperative
- Industry: Telecommunications
- Founded: 1951
- Headquarters: Minot, North Dakota
- Products: Internet; Security; Phone
- Total assets: $147M USD (2016)
- Number of employees: 210+ (2017)
- Website: srt.com

SRT Communications (formerly Souris River Telecommunications) is the largest telecommunications cooperative in North Dakota, serving customers with Internet, Security Alarm and Video Surveillance, Phone, and Business Phone Systems and services.

The company is governed by a twelve-member Board of Directors covering four districts. As a cooperative, patronage capital credits are awarded to member customers.

== History and milestones ==
In 1951, the Verendrye Electric Cooperative board of directors established the Souris River Telephone Mutual Aid Corporation to bring telephone service to those living in the rural areas of McHenry and Ward Counties. The first telephone exchange, the town of Martin, was purchased for $500 and had 82 telephone customers. In 1960, Minot Air Force Base became SRT's largest phone exchange, and by 1970 rotary dial telephones were replaced with touch pad style phones. In 1980, SRT began to sell cable television service, first available in the town of Westhope.

Although telephone cooperatives usually operate within set boundaries, in 1990 SRT reached outside their traditional territory to install telephone wire throughout the 17 floors of the North Dakota State Capitol building. Again expanding their offerings, in 1990 SRT became an agent to CommNet 2000, handling a new cellular phone system in Minot, and in 1992 opened their own long distance company. In 1994, SRT acquired Minot Telephone Company (formerly Northern States Power Telephone), the state's largest independent phone company serving approximately 25,000 lines in Minot, Burlington and Surrey.

In the late 1990s, SRT added Internet and Wireless Phones to their services, and in 2007 purchased the Velva telephone exchange from North Dakota Telephone Company in Devils Lake.

SRT Communications joined the State of North Dakota in suing telemarketing company WebSmart Interactive in 2003. The company owed SRT over $140,000 in unpaid bills.

In 2004, SRT employees James Newman and Dennis Schott were recognized by the Excellence in Leadership Award Program of the National Telecommunication Cooperative Association for their contributions to rural telecommunications in North Dakota.

According to general manager Steve Lysne, SRT Communications has built much of the infrastructure for rural broadband in North Dakota and would not need funds from the 2009 Stimulus Package. SRT has worked to expand the number of 9-1-1 towers in Ward County and was awarded a Community Public Safety Award from the Ward County Emergency Management Department in 2008.

Today, as North Dakota's largest telephone cooperative, SRT Communications, Inc. employs over 200 people and serves approximately 99,000 telephone customers in north central North Dakota.

== Products and services ==
=== Internet ===
SRT provides Internet service to rural and city homes through copper and fiber optic cable.

=== Security systems ===
Home and business security systems are monitored 24 hours by a UL approved monitoring station. Video surveillance specializing in home, farm and ranch, and small business is also available.

=== Personal home safety ===
SRT offers Home Safety systems in which a person can push a button to alert the 24-hour monitoring station to contact family or authorities in case of a fall, break in, or other emergency.

=== Telephone ===
SRT offers landline telephone, long distance, and calling features such as voice mail and caller ID.

=== Business services ===
SRT provides advanced voice, data and wireless communications systems to businesses of all sizes.
