= Telcel =

Mexican wireless telecommunications company

RadioMóvil Dipsa, S.A. de C.V.

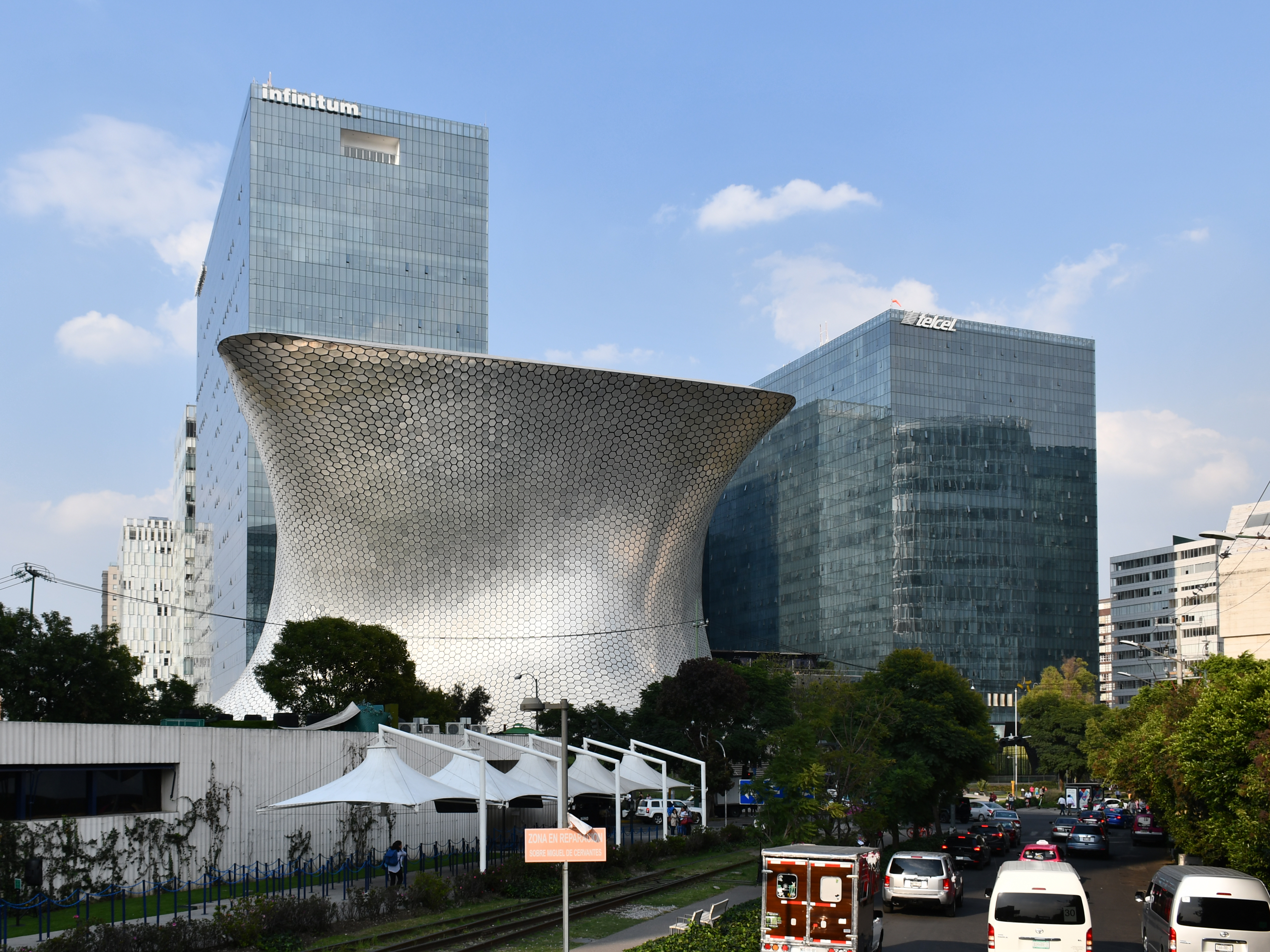
- Trade name: Telcel
- Type: Subsidiary
- Industry: Telecommunications
- Founded: 1984; 42 years ago (as RadioMóvil Dipsa)
- Founder: Carlos Slim
- Headquarters: Mexico City, Mexico
- Key people: Daniel Hajj Aboumrad
- Products: Fixed and Mobile telephony, Mobile Broadband
- Parent: América Móvil
- Website: www.telcel.com

RadioMóvil Dipsa, S.A. de C.V., doing business as Telcel, is a Mexican wireless telecommunications company, owned by América Móvil, founded in 1984 and based in Mexico City. Telcel holds concessions to operate a wireless network in all nine geographic regions in Mexico using both the 850 megahertz and 1900 megahertz radio spectrum.

== History ==
In June 1926, the company Publicidad Turística S.A. was founded, as a subsidiary of Teléfonos de México. Its main activity was the commercialization of phone directories (white section and Yellow Section).

In September 1954, he changed his company name to that of "Professional Directories" (DIPSA), since he began to specialize in the edition of the blue directory by streets, construction directory, tourism and others. During the same year and due to the modernization of telecommunications, Teléfonos de México integrates DIPSA in the administration of Mobile Radiotelephony.

In 1981, the Secretariat of Communications and Transport (SCT) was asked for a concession to install and operate a mobile radiotelephony system known as mobile radiotelephony (telephone in the car).

In 1984, the concession was obtained to operate the mobile radiotelephony service network in Mexico City, under the name of Radiomovil DIPSA S.A de C.V.

In 1989, the Telcel brand was created, starting operations in Mexico City.

In 1996, the company launched the Amigo system, the first prepaid system in America and the world.

In 2002, Telcel implemented the GSM network and Value-Added services under the Ideas Telcel concept.

In 2008, it launched its 3G connectivity system.

For 2012 it implements its LTE, LTE Advanced and 4G-LTE Connectivity system, which allows a browsing speed of up to 5 Mbps.

In March 2016, Telcel wins the spectrum tender for the frequency band 1990-1990 MHz / 2990-2990 MHz (AWS Band).

In 2017, they presented solutions related to the Internet of Things (IoT) ecosystem.

In 2020, the 5G network is launched in closed testing mode to the public and it was expected that at the beginning of 2021.

On November 6, 2023, Telcel renews its image, eliminating the characteristic icon of the phone next to its name, keeping only the latter.

== Voice services ==
Telcel provides services in, GSM (2G), UMTS (3G) and LTE (4G, 4.5G), including the VoLTE and VoWiFi call services. The 5G NSA network requires VoLTE for calls.

== Data services ==
Two-way SMS was introduced by the company in January 2002, and MMS, using GSM technology (for postpaid and prepaid customers), commenced in March 2003. Since December 2004, postpaid and prepaid customers may send and receive short messages to and from users from 35 other countries.

Telcel supplies data services in GPRS, EDGE, 3G HSPA, 3.5G HSPA+, 4G LTE and 5G.

== Sales and distribution ==
Telcel markets its wireless services primarily through exclusive distributors located throughout Mexico. As of March 31, 2007, Telcel had relationships with a network of approximately 1,171 exclusive distributors, who sell Telcel's services and products through approximately 48,320 points of sale and receive commissions.

== Network ==
=== 3G Technology ===
Telcel officially launched its 3G (850MHz Band) services on February 25, 2008 initially in the cities of: Guadalajara, Hermosillo, Mérida, León, Morelia, Monterrey, Tijuana, Puebla, Santiago de Querétaro and México D.F. This was the second 3G Wireless Network, in Mexico after Iusacell's 3G Nationwide CDMA2000 network. Telcel's 3G Network expanded to other cities, to finally become a national 3G network which reaches more than 350 cities. Telcel's 3G network is based on UMTS / HSDPA / HSPA+ technology (850Mhz/Band 5).

Telcel launched its HSPA+ network in Mexico City and other major Mexican cities, by the end of 2011.

Unlike many companies, who advertise their HSPA+ network as a "4G network," Telcel advertises its HSPA+ Network as a "3.5G network,". As it counts with a 4G LTE Network, which is the one they advertise as "4G".

=== 4G LTE Technology ===
Telcel is the second company in Latin America to promote a 4G service (under LTE Band 4/1700 MHz), but the other player in the market, AT&T, uses simply HSPA+ instead of LTE.
