= First Cellular of Southern Illinois =

First Cellular of Southern Illinois was a telecommunications company in Illinois, United States.

Services included:

- Owned and Operated Wireless phone carrier
- At its time, the largest digital network in area served with significant market share.
- Extensive nationwide network by partnering with multiple companies across the United States
- Sponsorship of local arts and education programs as well as wireless phone donations to area shelters.

The company was purchased by Alltel in an all-cash deal; the acquisition closed on May 1, 2006. Complete turnover of all stores occurred in early October.
