= Telecom North America =

Telna Inc.
- Type: Private
- Industry: Telecommunications
- Founded: 2002 (as 3U Telecom Inc)
- Headquarters: Toronto, Canada, USA, France, UK, Singapore, Hong Kong
- Area served: Global
- Key people: Gregory Gundelfinger (President and CEO); Michael Neuman (Executive Chairman)
- Products: Wireless; Telephone
- Website: telna.com

Telecom North America (Telna) is a global cellular connectivity platform that provides software connections to telecom networks via API. The company was founded in March 2002 by Jean Gottschalk and Herve Andrieu. Telna partnered with 3U Telecom AG, a German long-distance telephone provider, to launch its US subsidiary, incorporated in Nevada, on March 27, 2002. After a change of management in 3U Telecom AG in 2004, it sold its international subsidiaries to Elephant Talk Communications while keeping its Austrian and US subsidiary. In 2008, 3U Telecom Inc bought out 3U Telecom AG in a transaction that was finalized in December 2008. 3U Telecom Inc changed its name to Telecom North America Inc in January 2009. At the end of 2008, bought out the majority shareholder 3U Telecom AG and renamed the company Telecom North America Inc. (Telna).

== Services ==
=== Long distance and international calls ===
The firm used to be registered in all 50 states as a long distance telephone provider. It was providing 1+ long distance telephone service from landlines as well as international dial around service from cellular phones under the Telna brand. In 2016 it sold its long distance customer base to G3 Telecom USA and ceased providing long distance services while focusing on its mobile network operator (MNO) services.

=== Multi-IMSI Roaming Hub ===
In 2013, the firm launched the "multi-IMSI roaming hub", an international roaming services trading platform which allows MNOs and mobile virtual network operators (MVNOs) to sell and buy connectivity services to and from one another. It allows established MNOs to resell their outbound international roaming agreements to other members of the hub, at no CAPEX expense, while full MVNOs can resell services in their home countries to hub members.
