= Commnet Wireless =

American telecommunications company

- Company type: Subsidiary
- Industry: Telecommunications
- Headquarters: Castle Rock, Colorado
- Area served: Arizona, California, Colorado, Montana, Nebraska, New Mexico, Nevada, North Dakota, South Dakota, Oregon, Texas, Utah, and Wyoming
- Parent: ATN International
- Subsidiaries: Choice Broadband
- Website: www.commnetbroadband.com

Commnet Wireless is an American telecommunications company which offers wholesale roaming, enterprise, and retail solutions to other mobile network operators. It is a subsidiary of ATN International. Commnet serves the U.S. states of Arizona, California, Colorado, Montana, Nebraska, New Mexico, Nevada, North Dakota, Oregon, Texas, Utah, and Wyoming.

Commnet Wireless also operates the Choice Broadband brand, which provides wireline service to customers in the western United States.

Commnet has stopped offering their Choice Wireless brand as of December 31, 2024.

== Wireless networks ==
=== Radio frequency spectrum chart ===
The following chart lists the known frequency owned, and/or deployed by Commnet Wireless.

Frequency Band	Band number	Protocol	Generation	Status
850 MHz CLR	5	CDMA/EV-DO	2G/3G	Decommissioned
1.9 GHz PCS	2	CDMA/EV-DO	2G/3G	Decommissioned
850 MHz CLR	5	GSM/EDGE	2G	Active
1.9 GHz PCS	2	GSM/EDGE	2G	Active
850 MHz CLR	5	UMTS/HSPA	3G	Active
1.9 GHz PCS	2	UMTS/HSPA	3G	Active
600 MHz DD	71	LTE	4G	Active
700 MHz Lower SMH A/B/C Blocks	12	LTE	4G	Active
1.7/2.1 GHz AWS	4/66	LTE	4G	Active
