= AT&T Latin America =

Mexican division of the American telecom company AT&T

AT&T Mexico, S.A.U.

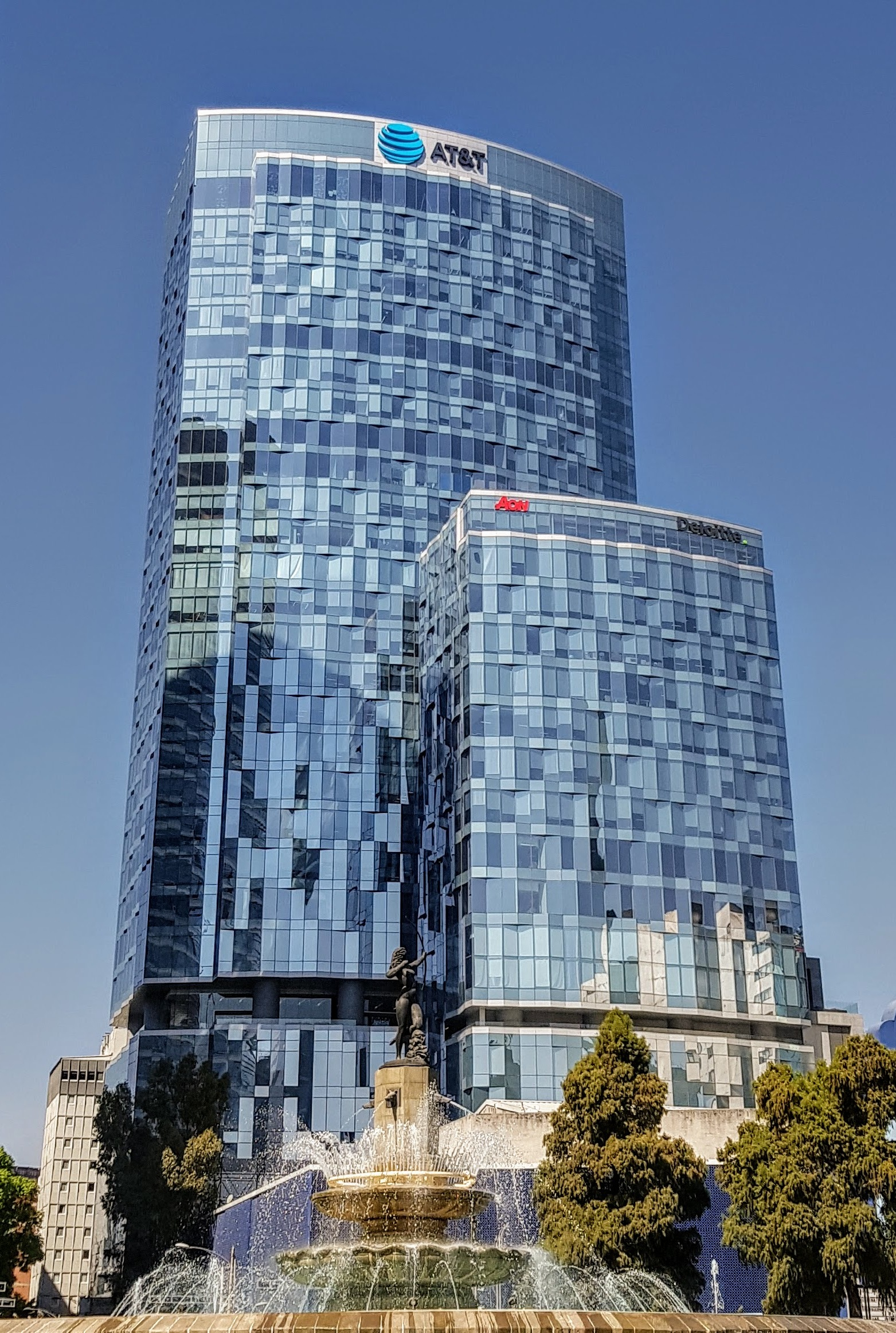
- Formerly: Grupo Iusacell, S.A. de C.V. (1992–2006); Grupo Iusacell, S.A.B. de C.V (2006–2015)
- Type: Subsidiary
- Industry: Telecommunications
- Predecessor: Nextel Mexico
- Founded: 1987; 39 years ago (as Iusacell); 2015; 11 years ago (as AT&T Mexico)
- Headquarters: Torre Diana, Río Lerma Street #232. at Río Misisiṕi st., Colonia Cuauhtémoc, Cuauhtémoc Borough, Mexico City, Mexico
- Number of locations: 6,000 retail stores; 3,000 owned stores 3,000 authorized stores
- Area served: Worldwide
- Key people: Mónica Aspe Bernal (CEO)
- Products: Wireless; Mobile Telephone; Internet
- Number of employees: 18,000
- Parent: Grupo Salinas (2003-2014); AT&T (2014-2026) Grupo Televisa (50%); Fintech Holdings (50%) (2026-Present)
- Subsidiaries: Unefón
- Website: att.com.mx

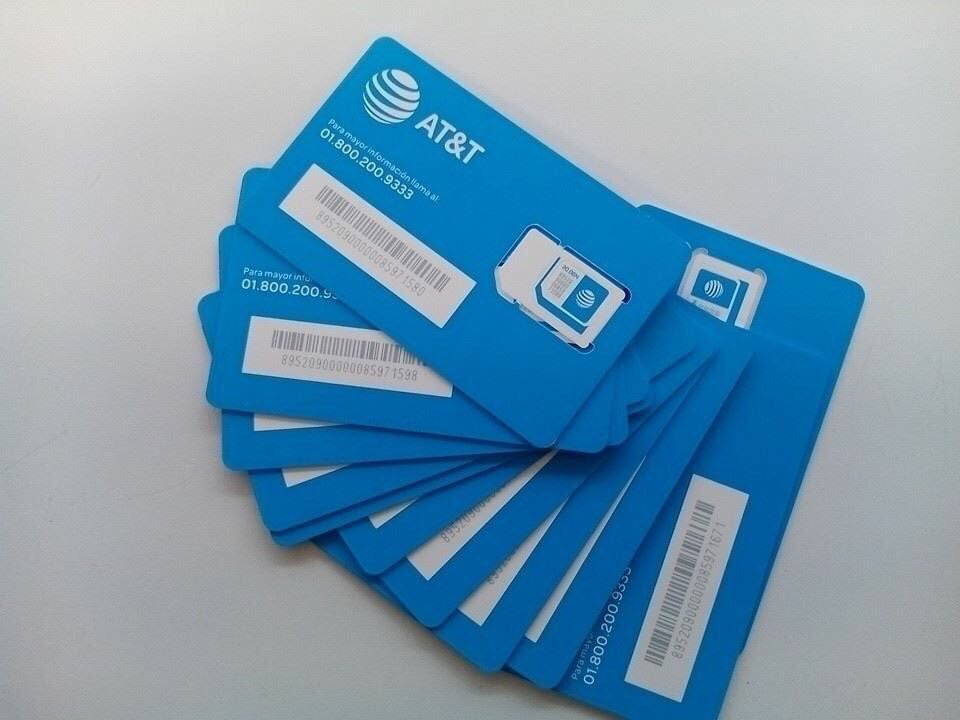

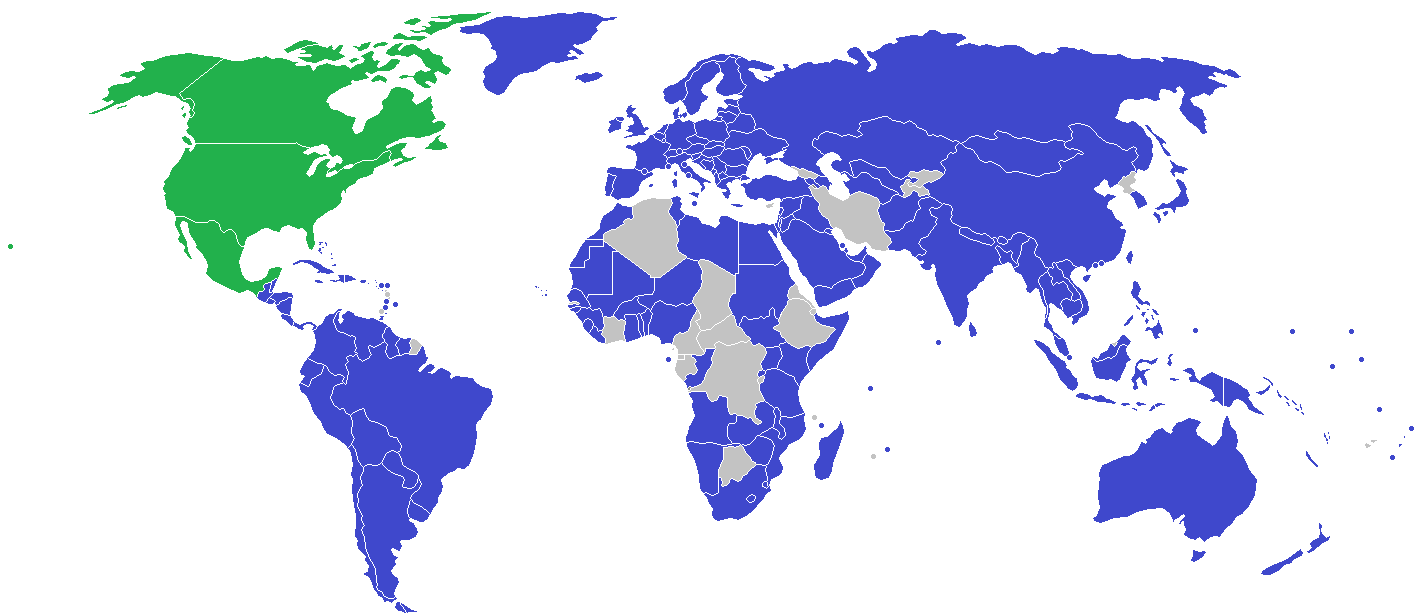

AT&T Mexico, S.A.U. (formerly known as Iusacell and Nextel Mexico, also known as AT&T Mexico Wireless and AT&T Mexico Mobility) is a Mexican mobile telephone operator and subsidiary of AT&T. AT&T Mexico is headquartered in Mexico City. Its mobile network is available in 90% of Mexico, serving 13% of the Mexican wireless market. AT&T is the third-largest wireless carrier in Mexico, with 24.103 million subscribers as of March 2026.

== Services ==
The company provides cellular services reaching about 90% of Mexico's population. The company also offers local and long-distance telephony, messaging services, mobile television and wireless broadband services.

== History ==
AT&T Mexico was originally Iusacell prior to its acquisition by AT&T.

Bell Atlantic (now Verizon Communications) and Vodafone Group together acquired 74.5% of the company in 2001 from the Peralta family, which founded Iusacell in 1987. But following Iusacell's default on debts, the two companies in 2003 sold their stake to Ricardo Salinas Pliego's Movil@ccess in a deal valued at $7.4 billion.

=== Movil@ccess tender offer ===
In June 2003 a Movil@ccess (Movilaccess) of Grupo Salinas, extended a tender offer to purchase the control of Grupo Iusacell's stock. At the time Grupo Salinas already own a mobile phone company, Unefon. The other major stock holder of Unefon, Grupo Saba, objected to the purchase of Iusacell because of debt and low profit problems. The former controlling shareholders of Grupo Iusacell, Verizon and Vodafone, agreed to tender the entirety of their stock, which resulted in the acquisition of a majority interest by Grupo Salinas.

=== Merger with Unefon ===
Unefon
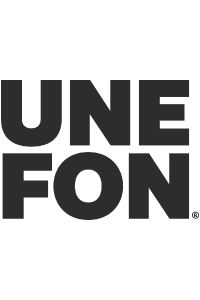
- Type: Subsidiary
- Industry: Telecommunications
- Founded: 1998; 28 years ago
- Headquarters: Torre Diana, Mexico City, Mexico.
- Services: Wireless communications
- Parent: AT&T Mexico
- Website: unefon.com.mx

The company was partially owned by Grupo Salinas and Mexican media group Televisa, and its network was CDMA only, using no analog base stations.

In March 2007, Grupo Salinas announced its intention to merge Iusacell with Unefon Holdings. Unefon was a wireless telephony operator focused on Mexico's mass market.

The resulting company had over 3.4 million subscribers, equivalent to approximately 7% of the wireless telecommunications market in Mexico.

The combined Iusacell and Unefon was the first wireless cellular service provider in the country with a third-generation platform (3G CDMA EVDO) that gave users access to a wide range of other telecommunications services and multimedia applications, making the mobile network an efficient vehicle for data transmission and value added services besides voice.

In 2007, the merger of Unefon and Iusacell was announced.

On November 15, 2010, Iusacell launched their HSPA+ network with speeds up to 21 Mbit/s. Similar to U.S. carrier T-Mobile US, it branded its HSPA+ network as "4G."

Starting 2010, Unefon started to use GSM technology and started sharing Iusacell stations and network.

However, on Wednesday, January 25, 2012, Cofetel temporarily refused to approve a merger between Televisa and Iusacell for illegal damage to third parties and hindering competition for open and pay television. This refusal continued until 2012 with Televisa and TV Azteca against Grupo Carso. Eventually, the merger was accepted with different conditions, among which allowing any company advertising time without condition, prohibiting the staff of Grupo Televisa and Grupo Salinas from hindering a developing third television network, and if not achieved within two years, undo the merger. With 8.2 million users at the time, the company also offered local and long-distance service, as well as wireless and fiber optic Internet. Fiber is available only in some neighborhoods of Mexico City and the states of Jalisco and Nuevo León. These services are offered under the brand Iusatel, messaging services (SMS, MMS, and email), mobile TV and mobile broadband (with your brand BAM). On Friday November 7, 2014 the US company AT&T announced the acquisition of Iusacell for 2.5 billion, including debt.

In September 2014, it was announced that Grupo Salinas would acquire Televisa's 50 percent stake in Iusacell for a fee of $717 million. On January 8, 2015, Grupo Televisa announced that the sale of its 50 percent stake had been completed.

Unefon remains as a brand used by AT&T Mexico, a subsidiary of AT&T Inc., used for prepaid products.

=== Merger of Iusacell and Nextel into AT&T ===
Former logo of Iusacell

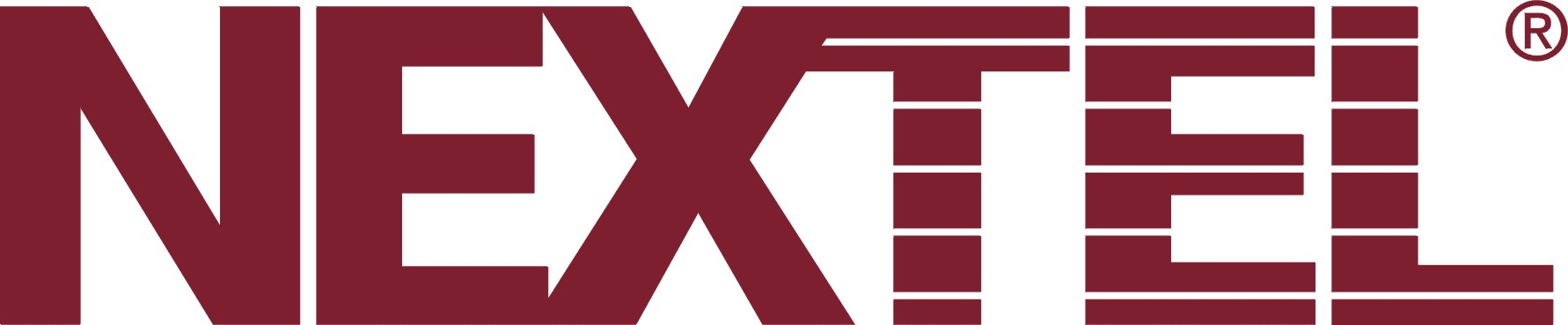
Former Nextel Mexico logo until 2012, and from 2012 to 2015

In November 2014, AT&T announced it would acquire Iusacell for US$2.5 billion from Grupo Salinas. The price includes $800 million in debt. Under the terms of the agreement, AT&T would acquire all of Iusacell's wireless properties, including licenses, network assets, retail stores and approximately 8.6 million subscribers. The purchase was completed on January 16, 2015. On January 30, 2015, AT&T announced the purchase of Nextel Mexico for $1.875 billion from NII Holdings, excluding financial debts. The transaction was completed and approved by the Federal Telecommunications Institute in Mexico and the US Bankruptcy Court for the District of New York on April 30, 2015. AT&T launched several new plans on August 24, 2015, under the AT&T brand and began renaming Iusacell and Nextel stores in a process that was completed by the end of 2016. AT&T invested an additional $3 billion in Mexico through 2018 to expand its high-speed mobile broadband coverage to 100 million people, The company currently holds the largest amount of spectrum in the country. While gradually moving the Nextel and Iusacell brands to AT&T premium services, AT&T intended to keep the Unefon brand, which was part of Iusacell, for low-end prepaid users.

On December 10, 2021, AT&T Mexico announced it intended to launch its 5G NR network using its 2.5 GHz spectrum, making it the first mobile network operator in the country to build out an NR network.

== Network ==
AT&T Mexico currently operates a 3G UMTS, and 4G LTE, while it is currently testing a 5G NR network. It shut down its CDMA network on October 3, 2016, its IDEN network in 2017 and its GSM network in 2019.

=== Radio frequency spectrum chart ===
The following is a list of known frequencies that AT&T Mexico owns and uses on its network.

Frequencies used on the AT&T Mexico Network
Frequency range	Band number	Protocol	Generation	Status	Notes
850 MHz CLR	5	UMTS/HSPA+	3G	Active	HSPA and HSPA+ services marketed as 4G.
1.7/2.1 GHz AWS	4	UMTS/HSPA+	3G	Active	HSPA and HSPA+ services marketed as 4G.
1.9 GHz PCS	2	UMTS/HSPA+	3G	Active	HSPA and HSPA+ services marketed as 4G.
850 MHz CLR	5/26	LTE/LTE-A	4G	Active/Building Out	Primary LTE coverage band.
1.7/2.1 GHz AWS	4/66	LTE/LTE-A	4G	Active/Building Out	Additional LTE band for capacity.
1.9 GHz PCS	2	LTE/LTE-A	4G	Active/Building Out	Additional LTE band for capacity.
2.6 GHz IMT-E	7/38	LTE/LTE-A	4G	Active/Building Out	Additional LTE band for capacity.
2.6 GHz IMT-E	n7	NR	5G	Active/Building Out	Acquired in 2018 auction. Network launched in trial in select areas in late 2021.
3.5 GHz C-band	n78	NR	5G	Pending deployment	Acquired spectrum from Nextel merger.

== See also ==
- Bell System
- AT&T Inc., parent company
- AT&T Mobility, United States wireless service provider owned by parent company
- Sky México, television provider formerly part-owned by AT&T
- Telcel, largest competitor
- Movistar, competitor

== Sources ==
- Iusacell at hoovers.com
