= List of mobile virtual network operators in the United States =

Mobile virtual network operators (MVNOs) in the United States lease wireless telephone and data service from the three major cellular carriers in the country—AT&T Mobility, T-Mobile US, and Verizon—and offer various levels of free and/or paid talk, text and data services to their customers. In April 2019, American MVNOs provided service to 36 million active subscribers.

== Voice and data service operators ==
In general, the types of phones and other devices supported by the MVNOs are in line with the technologies used by the Mobile Network Operator (MNO), the underlying cellular network provider. All major and regional MNOs use 4G LTE / LTE Advanced and 5G NR protocols (2G and 3G having been deprecated and shut down), with GSM technologies.

However, many MVNOs tend to sell somewhat older phone models (e.g. ones discontinued by the host networks), which can affect whether all technologies supported by the carrier network are usable by MVNO customers. The acronym BYOD means "Bring Your Own Device", indicating that a customer can port a cellphone or other cellular device they already own to the MVNO, rather than having to buy/rent a new device from them (assuming it is compatible with the host network, has not been reported stolen, is not still locked into a contract, etc.). MVNOs often restrict the list of BYOD devices they'll support to a smaller subset than the host networks. MVNOs will often push/favor a specific model phone because it is locked into the host carrier "preferred network" that gives that MVNO the best deal/rates.

Providers supporting multiple host networks use only one of them for each device, depending on the specific phone model and/or SIM card used (except for Google Fi Wireless, which switches automatically between the different listed host networks based on factors such as relative signal strength).

Different companies target different markets: typically a subset of business, lifeline, and personal. Lifeline refers to the Universal Service Fund's Lifeline low-income phone program. In the case of providers with both Lifeline and non-Lifeline offerings, but different options for each (as opposed to the same options, but different costs), the Lifeline offerings have been put on a separate row with "[Lifeline]" in the "Company" field. Note that though the Lifeline program is a Federal one, each state is responsible for implementing its own version, so details beyond the basic requirements of the program can differ significantly from state to state (starting with the set of provider companies available). As of this writing, Lifeline provider info has mostly only been filled in for California and Minnesota.

Most of the MVNOs in this table provide voice, text, and data services to mobile phones ("Yes" in Phone service column; note that this column does not indicate whether the provider sells phones – all providers offering phone service sell phones unless the "BYOD" column contains "Yes, BYOD-only"). Some MVNOs also have data-only offerings, which can be intended for tablets ("Tablet plans available" in Notes column), or can require the purchase (or BYOD) of a dedicated mobile broadband modem, usually in the form of a Wi-Fi Hotspot device ("Yes" in Modem service column; not to be confused with the Tethering / phone hotspot (Note: Also known as "Personal Hotspot" or as "Mobile Hotspot", though the latter can also refer to dedicated hotspot modem/router devices.) column, which refers to the ability to use a phone or tablet to share data as a Wi-Fi hotspot or via Bluetooth or USB. There are also MVNOs who provide only data service to mobile hotspot devices (mobile broadband providers).

Native Wi-Fi calling refers to the ability of mobile phones on the service to seamlessly use Wi-Fi rather than the cellular network to connect normally dialed calls, when enabled. It does not refer to the ability to use third-party programs to make calls over Wi-Fi networks, which is generally always supported on smartphones.

Third-party websites have been gaining popularity among American consumers who seek to reduce their expenses on wireless services. These websites have established partnerships with major cellular carriers such as AT&T Mobility, T-Mobile US, and Verizon, to provide customers with discounted plans, along with complimentary or low-priced smartphones and tablets to customers who sign up for services through their portals.

Although certain customers prefer going straight to the major carriers or their MVNO partners, some are drawn to third-party websites due to the unique offers and perks that come along with them. These platforms typically have simplified and expedited signup processes, and may offer additional bonuses such as free shipping or extended warranties.

It's important to keep in mind, however, that not all third-party websites are trustworthy, and some may employ deceitful or fraudulent practices. Thus, it is always advisable for consumers to conduct research and examine reviews prior to engaging in business with any website or service provider.

Company	Host network(s)	Market	Phone service	Modem service	BYOD	Unlimited fast data	Unlimited slow data	5G access	Tethering / phone hotspot	International	Native Wi-Fi calling	Notes
Access Wireless	T-Mobile	Lifeline: CA	Yes	No	Yes, but must call to check compatibility	No, plans capped at 6 GB maximum for Californians	No	?	?	?	?	Owned by i-wireless.
Affinity Cellular	Verizon	Personal	Yes	No	Yes	Yes, on Unlimited Data plan, though "On our Unlimited Data plan, the fair use threshold is 35 GB of data. If this amount is exceeded, it will result in throttling of data."	No	Yes, with compatible device.	?	No; also, no service in Alaska	?	AAA members receive extra benefits.
Airvoice Wireless	AT&T	Personal	Yes	No?	Yes	No, "We have the right to slow down the speed of data browsing upon our own discretion at any time during your 5 or 30 day cycle."	Yes, on Unlimited data plan (only?); 2G speeds: 128 kbit/s	?	?	Yes, unlimited int'l calling and texting on appropriate plans	?	Owned by Airvoice Wireless. Terms of Services includes "Since you are on an Unlimited Plan, there will be no disputes about calls not connecting or dropped calls or any other reason to call customer service and complain."
Allvoi Wireless	AT&T	Personal	Yes	No?	Yes	No, plans capped at 15 GB max	Yes, on Unlimited plans	?	No	Yes, Calls to int'l #s on Unlimited plans	?	
Americas Favorite Mobile	T-Mobile	Personal	Yes	No	Yes	Yes, on Unlimited Data plan, though "Usage over 26 GB of data in a month period may result in throttled speeds when in congested areas."	Yes, on 4 GB Data plan	?	No	?	?	Available to the general public. Gives a portion of its proceeds to veterans and military personnel via a charity foundation. Previously used the Verizon network. Formerly known as Armed Forces Wireless.
Assist Wireless	T-Mobile	Lifeline: OK, AR, MD and MO	Yes		Yes	No, plans capped at 6 GB maximum with additional payment of $5 per month from consumer with OK Tribal Lifeline Plan	No	?				
Assurance Wireless	T-Mobile	Lifeline: Over 40 states	Yes		No	No, plans capped at 6 GB maximum for ZIP codes within California	No	Yes				Owned by T-Mobile.
Beast Mobile	AT&T	Personal	Yes	Yes	Yes	No, plans capped at 10 GB max	Yes, on Unlimited Talk, Text & High Speed Data plan	?	Yes, phone hotspot on Sprint only, for extra fee	Yes, int'l calling from U.S. with add-on?	?	First MVNO based on the FreeMo MVNE. Operates "Phones For The Homeless" program in Seattle and Oakland.
Black Wireless	AT&T	Personal	Yes	No	Yes, BYOD-only; no online compatibility-checker?	No, plans capped at 6 GB max	Yes, 2G speeds: 128 kbit/s	?	No	Yes, non–Pay As You Go plans include unlimited (but not "unreasonable") calls to up to 10 unique int'l #s per month in >65 countries	?	
boom! MOBILE	T-Mobile, Verizon	Personal, Business	Yes	Yes	Yes, but no online compatibility-checker	No, plans capped at 20 GB max on Verizon, 60 GB max on AT&T	Yes, 2G speeds: 128 kbit/s	?	Yes, but "iPhone Only for Non-HD" (??) on Verizon network	Yes, int'l calling and texting, but on AT&T network only	?	AT&T network available to business customers only.
Boost Mobile	AT&T (new activations), T-Mobile (Legacy activations only)	Personal, Business	Yes	Yes	Yes	No	Yes	Yes, with compatible device.	Yes	Yes, for an additional fee	Yes	Owned by EchoStar.
Breezeline Mobile	AT&T	Personal	?	?	?	?	?	?	?	?	?	Owned by Cogeco.
CellNUVO	AT&T, T-Mobile, Verizon	Personal	Yes	Maybe: depends on the MVNO or major network	Yes	Maybe: depends on the MVNO or major network	Maybe: depends on the MVNO or major network	?	Maybe: depends on the MVNO or major network	Maybe: depends on the MVNO or major network	Maybe: depends on the MVNO or major network	"Virtual MVNO" that directs customers to WhistleOut (so, arguably "virtual virtual virtual") to get price comparisons of other MVNOs and major carriers with affiliate links to sign up. In addition, users may install and use CellNUVO app to play ad-supported "simple swipe games" to earn credits to apply against cell service bills.
Cellular Abroad	AT&T	Personal	Yes	Yes	Yes	No, plans capped at 1 GB max	No	?	?	Yes, int'l calling, texting, and roaming	?	Owned by Cellular Abroad Inc. No unlimited services except incoming texts (worldwide). Sells and rents int'l phones & hotspot devices. Offers VPN that works in China. Offers service in Antarctica. BBB A+ rating.
Charity Mobile	Verizon	Personal	Yes	No	Yes	Yes, on Unlimited plan, but "Data usage of 30 GB or more on any line will result in cellular data access being throttled for the remainder of the billing cycle."	Yes, on Unlimited plan, throttled after 30 GB of usage.	Yes	Yes, requires a Data Enabled line.	Yes, additional rates apply per country	Yes	Pro-life charities
China Telecom CTExcel	T-Mobile	Personal	Yes	?	Yes, BYOD-only	No, plans capped at 10 GB max	Yes, 2G speeds: 128 kbit/s	?	No	Yes, plans available with unlimited calls to 20 countries, unlimited int'l texts, int'l roaming	?	Owned by China Telecom. China Telecom and parent company China Telecommunications Corporation are state-owned (by China). Dual-number activation: U.S. phone number and virtual Chinese local number.
Community Phone	AT&T, Verizon	Personal	Yes	No?	Yes	Yes, though after 22 GB, speeds are not throttled, but service may be deprioritized during periods of network congestion. After 30 GB the service may slow down or stop.	Yes, after 22 GB of fast data, during some periods of network congestion	?	Yes	Yes, with Unlimited plans, unlimited Calls to Canada and Mexico, and unlimited roaming in Mexico	Yes	Tablet plans available. Physical store in Cambridge, MA. Promotes tech literacy, puts on seminars at senior centers, etc.
Consumer Cellular	AT&T (new activations), T-Mobile (Legacy activations only)	Personal	Yes	Yes?	Yes	No, after 50 GB of use, your access to high speed data will be reduced to 30%, and you may experience slower speeds for the remainder of your billing cycle.	Yes, though speeds may be throttled once use exceeds 50 GB in addition to overage charging	Yes, Access to both TMO and ATT 5G Networks.	Yes, Tethering data is shared with data on the account.; reportedly, tethering can be added to plans on request	Yes, int'l calling, texting, and roaming	Yes	Owned by GTCR. Tablet plans available. Discounts offered to AARP members, including 5% off monthly service.
CREDO Mobile	Verizon	Personal	Yes	?	Yes	No, plans capped at 20 GB max	Yes, on Unlimited Data plan; 2G speeds: 64 kbit/s	Yes	Yes	Yes, int'l calls and roaming for select countries	Yes	Owned by Working Assets. Tablet plans available. Switched from Sprint to Verizon in August 2016. Sells itself as a strong supporter of liberal / progressive political issues such as "Saving Mother Earth" and funds Planned Parenthood, among others.
Cricket Wireless	AT&T	Personal	Yes	Yes	Yes	Yes, on Unlimited extra. On unlimited data plans, but data speeds throttled to 3 Mbit/s, video streaming throttled to 1.5 Mbit/s (SD quality); after 22 GB on Unlimited plan, or anytime on Unlimited Extra plan, "Cricket may temporarily slow data speeds during network congestion"	Yes	Yes, with compatible device.	Yes, but on Unlimited data plans, after 10 GB, throttled to 2G speeds: 128 kbit/s	Yes, with appropriate plans: unlimited calling to landlines in 35 countries from U.S., unlimited texts to 37 countries from U.S., unlimited calling and texts to and from Canada, Mexico, and the U.S., roaming in Canada and Mexico	Yes	Owned by AT&T.
DataXoom	AT&T, T-Mobile, Verizon	Business	Yes		Yes	No?	No?	?				
ENC Mobile 迎客移动	T-Mobile	Personal	Yes	No	Yes, check at website	Yes, down speed after 20 GB on unlimited plan, service may be deprioritized during periods of network congestion.	Yes, 2G speeds	Yes, with Compatible device.	Yes	Yes, unlimited calls to Mainland China, Hongkong, Macau and Taiwan. Special feature：one SIM two number，US and China 中美双号：提供中国的移动号码接受来自中国的短信和通话	Yes	
EcoMobile	T-Mobile, Verizon	Personal	Yes	Yes	Yes	No, plans capped at 8 GB max	Yes, 2G speeds	?	No?	Yes, calls to int'l #s from U.S.	?	
EXTREMEConnect.me	AT&T, T-Mobile	Personal	Yes	Yes	Yes		Yes					
enTouch Wireless	AT&T, T-Mobile,	Lifeline: AZ, AR, CA, CO, GA, HI, ID, IN, IA, KS, KY, LA, MD, MI, MN, MS, MO, NE, NV, ND, OH, OK, OR, PA, PR, RI, SC, SD, TX, UT, WA, WV, WI, WY; Personal	Yes	No?	Yes	No, plans capped at 6 GB maximum for California Tribal Plan only	No	?	?	Yes, calls to int'l #s available through BOSS International Long Distance		Speeds limited to around 1.5 Mbit/s up/down on Lifeline Plans. Formerly Boomerang Wireless.
FirstNet by AT&T	AT&T	Personal	?	?	?	?	?	?	?	?	?	Owned by AT&T.
Flash Wireless	Verizon	Personal	Yes	No?	Yes, but "By the end of 2021, 3G and older 4G devices will no longer work properly on Flash Wireless."	No, plans capped at 22 GB max with unlimited slow data, or (on Sprint only) 50 GB max without	Yes, on Unlimited Data plan	No, coming soon	Yes, but only on iPhone and select Android models, and on Sprint, only up to 10 GB	Sprint: Yes, unlimited calling to Canada, Mexico, & Puerto Rico; per-min. rates to others; unlimited calling to 80 or >130 additional countries with World Plan add-ons; unlimited (?) int'l texting / Verizon: Yes, unlimited calling to Canada, Mexico, & Puerto Rico; per-min. rates to others; int'l texting for $0.20 per message	Yes, and texting, but only for Sprint?	Owned by ACN; ACN is the world's largest direct seller of telecommunications, energy and essential services for home and business. International roaming no longer offered as of 2019-08-01.
FreedomPop	AT&T	Personal, Business	Yes	Yes	Yes	Yes(?), "by completing partner offers"	Yes, "by completing partner offers"	?	Yes	Yes, int'l calling from U.S.	Yes, and texting, but via FreedomPop app, not natively	Owned by Red Pocket Mobile. Voice is VoIP by default; "Premium Voice" add-on enables cellular calling.
FreeUP Mobile	AT&T	Personal	Yes	No	Yes	No, Unlimited Data offers first 15 GB at 4G speeds	Yes, 2G speeds after allotment used, except FREE and lowest tier plan	?	No	Yes, unlimited calling to 150 countries or "Pay As You Go" per-minute rates - available with all plans; seems to include even FREE one. Int'l texting to more than 150 countries.	Yes, but via FreeUP Talk app, not natively	FREE plan: "250 Talk and Text", Unlimited Wi-Fi; upgraded plans available for additional charge. Unlimited 2G after allotment added on select plans on 10/22/2019.
Gen Mobile	AT&T, T-Mobile	Personal	Yes	?	Yes	No?	No?	?	Yes	Yes, unlimited calling to >100 countries from U.S., unlimited int'l texts (on appropriate plans)	Yes	Owned by EchoStar.
Global Data Telecom	AT&T, T-Mobile, Verizon	Business	Yes					?				
Good2Go Mobile	AT&T	Personal	Yes	No?	Yes	No	Yes	?	No, "Technically no. Tethering is against the Terms & Conditions of Good2Go Mobile."	Yes, unlimited Calls & Texts to 60 countries with International Plan, per-minute rate for other countries	Yes	Owned by Ztar Mobile.
Google Fi Wireless	T-Mobile, Verizon	Personal	Yes	No?	Yes, Only "Designed for Fi" models have full functionality (e.g. non-Fi phones only use the T-Mobile network)	No, plans capped at 15 GB (Flexible plan) or 22 GB (Unlimited plan) max	Yes	Yes, with compatible device and only on the T-Mobile Network.	Yes	Yes, int'l calls, unlimited int'l texts, and roaming with data (6 GB fast, then unlimited slow, with Bill Protection), using Three network (UMTS-based)	Yes	Owned by Google. Switches automatically between the different listed host networks and Wi-Fi hotspots based on factors such as relative signal strength.
h2o Wireless	AT&T	Personal	Yes	No?	Yes	No, but speeds are limited to 8 Mbit/s for LTE and 4 Mbit/s for 4G. (After 30 GB speeds will be slowed.)	Yes, 2G speeds	?	Yes, but only on Unlimited Plan and only 30 GB at LTE speeds.	Yes, int'l calls to 10 unique int'l landline #s per month in landlines in >50 countries and to mobile phones in select countries on non-Pay-As-You-Go plans, int'l texting	No	Owned by Telrite Holdings.
Helium Mobile	T-Mobile	Personal	Yes	No	Yes, BYOD-only	Yes, but T-Mobile deprioritizes at 50 GB.		Yes	Yes; limited to 5 GB per month	Yes (Soon)	Yes (Soon)	Owned by Nova, a Service Provider on the Helium MOBILE Network.
Hello Mobile	T-Mobile	Personal	Yes	No?	Yes	Yes, on Unlimited data plan, but "speeds may be lowered during periods of high congestion"	No	?	Yes, on Unlimited data plan, otherwise extra fee for Mobile Hotspot	Yes, unlimited int'l calling and texting from U.S.	Yes	Formerly also offered T-Mobile coverage.
Jethro Mobile	T-Mobile	Personal	Yes	No?	Yes	No, plans capped at 6 GB max	Yes, 2G speeds	?	Yes, on 6 GB monthly and 1 GB yearly plans	Yes, calls to up to 15 unique #s in 75 int'l destinations on Unlimited International, or pay-as-you-go credits for other destinations	?	FAQ link just redirects to current page. Based on Plintron MVNA.
Jolt Mobile	AT&T	Personal	Yes	No?	Yes, BYOD-only	No, plans capped at 5 GB max	No	?	?	Yes, direct dialing to int'l #s	?	Owned by Mobile-Net.
KidsConnect	T-Mobile	Personal	Yes	No	No, specialty 3-button i Luv Wireless KC2 only?	No	No	?	No	No	No	GPS tracker phone for communication between kids and their parents.
Kroger Wireless	T-Mobile	Personal	Yes	No?	Yes	No, plans capped at 20 GB max	Yes, on Unlimited data plan	?	Yes?	Yes, int'l calling from U.S.	?	Owned by i-wireless. Phones available for sale online and in Kroger-owned stores such as Ralphs.
Lexvor	T-Mobile	Personal, Business	Yes	No	Yes	Yes, but speeds may be slowed after 50 GB of usage due to network prioritization.	No	Yes	Yes	No	Yes	Focus on providing a Premium service without cutting corners in any face of their business. Previously used the Verizon network.
Life Wireless	AT&T, T-Mobile	Lifeline: AR, AZ, CA, CO, GA, IA, IL, IN, KS, KY, LA, MD, ME, MI, MN, MO, MS, ND, NV, OH, OK, PA, PR, RI, SC, TX, UT, VI, WA, WI and WV	Yes		Yes, but not officially supported	No, plans capped at 6 GB maximum for Californians	No	?				Owned by Telrite Holdings.
Lively	Verizon	Personal	Yes	No?	Yes	Yes, on unlimited data plan?	No?	Yes	?	Yes, int'l calling, texting, and roaming in select destinations	?	Was "GreatCall". Owned by Best Buy. "Senior Cell Phones, Medical Alert Systems & Safety for Seniors".
Lycamobile	AT&T (new activations), T-Mobile (Legacy activations only)	Personal	Yes	No?	Yes	Yes, on the top High Data Plan, but "After Use of 50 GB of 4G LTE, data speeds may be reduced for the remainder of the plan period", and tethering / phone hotspot is not permitted on this (or any?) plan	Yes	?	No?	Yes, unlimited talk & text to >75 countries, int'l roaming	Yes, and texting	Owned by Lycamobile. Lycamobile has been involved in legal and financial controversies in France, Ireland, and the U.K. They are a significant donor to the British Conservative Party. See Lycamobile § Controversies for details and citations.
Metro by T-Mobile	T-Mobile	Personal	Yes	Yes	Yes	Yes, on Unlimited High-Speed plans, but "If congested, the fraction of customers using >35 GB/month may notice reduced speeds and Metro customers may notice reduced speeds vs. T-Mobile due to prioritization. Video streams at 480p. Unlimited on handset and on network only."	Yes	Yes, with compatible device.	Yes	Yes, unlimited calls and texts to select countries, and roaming in Canada and Mexico	Yes	Owned by T-Mobile. Formerly MetroPCS.
MetTel Mobile	AT&T, Verizon	Business	Yes					?				
Mint Mobile	T-Mobile	Personal	Yes	No?	Yes	Yes, though "Data speeds reduce after 35 GB"	Yes, 2G (64 kbit/s) speeds or higher	Yes	Yes, though "The data you use just pulls from your monthly 4G LTE amount", which may indicate phone hotspot cannot use unlimited slow data	Yes, int'l long-distance calling via PLD, and int'l roaming	Yes, and texting	Owned by T-Mobile. Formerly Mint SIM. Targets youth market with advertising and website content. campusSIMS partners with Mint to serve the market of international students in the U.S.
Mobal	T-Mobile	Personal, Business	Yes	Yes	Yes	Yes, but only in Japan with Japan SIMs; Europe SIM capped at 7 GB max	Yes, with USA Visitor SIM only: 2G speeds (128 kbit/s) after 2 GB of 4G data	?	Yes, "but there is no guarantee that it will work"	Yes, int'l calling, texts, and roaming with appropriate SIMs	?	Bypasses the usual stringent requirements for obtaining a Japanese SIM. Donates the majority of its profits to self-founded charity ("Krizevac transforms communities. This starts with placing a cross on a mountain in an area of great need. This symbolizes the values of public service & personal sacrifice underpinning the Krizevac Charity."). "Mobal is one of the world's longest running cell phone providers and was founded in 1989".
MobileX	Verizon	Personal	Yes	?	Yes	No	?	Yes, with compatible device	Yes	Yes	Yes	
NOW Mobile	Verizon	Personal	?	?	?	?	?	?	?	?	?	Owned by Comcast Corporation.
Naked Mobile	Cellular One of NE AZ, AT&T, T-Mobile	Personal, Lifeline: AZ, NM, UT	Yes	Yes. The SIM should work in a hotspot but they don't sell any themselves	Yes	No Their highest plan only goes up to 60 GB of fast data	Yes, unlimited "2G Data"	No	Yes	No	Yes. It may not work on some phones though	Owned by Smith Bagley Inc under the Cellular One branding. Operates a native network in parts of AZ, UT, and NM
netTALK Connect	T-Mobile	Business	Yes		Yes, BYOD-only			?		Yes, unlimited int'l talk & text in U.S., Canada, and Puerto Rico	Yes	Owned by netTalk.
Optimum Mobile	T-Mobile	Personal, Business	Yes	No?	Yes, BYOD-only, unless phones are bought at an Altice retail location. Currently supported models are (unlocked) iPhone SE, 6, and above; Galaxy S9 series; and Motorola moto e6 & g^{7} play.	Yes, when not roaming off Sprint, but tethering speeds limited to 600 kbit/s; after 50 GB data usage, tethering and video streaming limited to 2G speeds: 128 kbit/s	Yes	?	Yes, but see Unlimited Fast Data column for speed throttling info	Yes, unlimited int'l talk and text from U.S. to >35 countries; unlimited talk, text, and data (1 GB 4G LTE, then unlimited 2G unless additional data packs purchased) while roaming in >35 countries	Yes	Owned by Optimum Communications. Verizon network available to business customers only.
Patriot Mobile	AT&T, T-Mobile, Verizon	Personal	Yes	Yes	Yes	Yes	Yes	Yes	Yes	Yes, int'l calling from U.S., including unlimited calls to Canada and Mexico	Yes	Tablet plans available. Takes a political stance with "Mobilizing Conservatives" tagline and "fight the liberal agenda through your phone", etc.
Pix Wireless	AT&T, T-Mobile, Verizon	Personal	Yes	No?	Yes, BYOD-only	NoAT&T: No, capped at 30 GB, hotspot capped at 15 GB / Sprint: No, plans capped at 12 GB max / T-Mobile: Unannounced / Verizon: No, plans capped at 12 GB max	AT&T: No? / Sprint: Yes, 2G speeds / T-Mobile: Unannounced / Verizon: Yes	?	AT&T: Yes / Sprint: No / T-Mobile: No / Verizon: No / International: Yes, assuming active data plan in participating country	Yes, int'l SIMs available, but Calls and Texts to int'l #s with U.S. SIMs only available on Verizon network	Yes	Tablet plans available.
Pulse Cellular	AT&T, T-Mobile, Verizon	Personal, Business	Yes	Yes, MiFi routers, Hotspot, USB Modem & Tablet plans available, (Full Unlimited No Deprioritization & Unlimited with deprioritization plans available online & through call center)	Yes, Most unlocked devices are accepted if compatible with preferred network.	Yes, Full unthrottled unlimited plans available. No speed caps. AT&T is network managed at 22 GB, and throttled at 75 GB.	Yes, Low cost 2 GB LTE plan throttles to 128 kbit/s for unlimited audio streaming	?	Yes, 4G & 3G speeds depending on wireless plan	Yes, U.S. coverage also usable in Puerto Rico & U.S. Virgin Islands; coverage also provided in Canada & Mexico with 5 GB of LTE data (unlimited 128 kbit/s thereafter), network normal usage policies apply; additional international calling, texting, and roaming packages available via call center or email	Yes	Additional plans and new international territories in progress.
Puppy Wireless	T-Mobile, Verizon	Personal	Yes	No?	Yes, BYOD-only, but on Verizon network, "CDMA (3G)-only devices, including 3G basic phones and 3G smartphones / 4G LTE smartphones that do not support HD Voice / Apple iPhone 5s or prior including the Apple iPhone 5c" can no longer be activated	Yes(?), on Sprint only	No	?	No	Yes, int'l calling from U.S., Puerto Rico, and U.S. Virgin Islands	?	
Pure Talk	AT&T	Personal	Yes	No	Yes	No (After 30 GB of data usage you will experience slower speeds)	Yes, 2G speeds: 128 kbit/s	?	Yes, but only officially supported on Apple devices. Android may work depending on model and firmware version.	No	No	Owned by Telrite Holdings.
Reach Mobile	T-Mobile	Personal	Yes	No, Reach supports personal hotspots, but not dedicated hotspot or modem devices (Jetpacks, USB modems).	Yes, BYOD-only	No, plans capped at 20 GB max	Yes, on Unlimited plan	?	Yes	Yes	No	10% of each data plan contributed to provide connectivity to women, families, and students in India, Nigeria, and the U.S.
Red Pocket Mobile	AT&T, T-Mobile, Verizon	Personal	Yes	Yes?	Yes	Yes, on unlimited plan	Yes, 2G speeds on plans with 3 GB LTE/month or more	?	AT&T, Sprint & T-Mobile: Android & iOS / Verizon: iOS only	Yes, calling, unlimited texting, and voice(?) + data roaming	Only on AT&T, T-Mobile and Sprint	Owned by Red Pocket Mobile.
SafetyNet Wireless	AT&T, T-Mobile	Lifeline: CA, CO, GA, KY, MI, OK, PA and WI	Yes		No	No, plans capped at 6 GB maximum for Californians with SafetyNet Wireless for 90 days	No	?				
Seawolf Wireless	T-Mobile	Personal	Yes	No?	Yes, BYOD-only	No, plans capped at 2 GB max	No?	?	?	Yes, int'l calling & texting from U.S., including >30 countries for free	?	"With business locations in both the US and China, Seawolf focuses on the world's largest two communication markets, offering a wide range of IT/Communication solutions and services".
SECURE PHONE	AT&T, T-Mobile	Personal	Yes	No	No, specialty Smartphone designed by i Luv Wireless, LLC	No	No	No	No	Yes, international calling to Mexico and Canada. International calling to other countries can be added as a bolt-on service.	Yes	SECURE GPS tracker phone for communication between kids, adults, special needs and their guardians.
SafeLink Wireless	Verizon	Lifeline	?	?	?	?	?	?	?	?	?	Owned by Verizon.
Selectel Wireless	Verizon	Personal	Yes	No?	Yes	No, plans capped at 22 GB max	Yes, 2G speeds	?	?	No, "International use is strictly prohibited on Selectel's service. Dialing and/or receiving international calls and/or texts may result in permanent suspension due to violation of terms of use. In the event your service is suspended for violation of terms of use a refund for purchased plans will not be issued."	?	Has corporate stores and authorized retailers throughout most of the U.S.
Simple Mobile	Verizon (New activations), T-Mobile (Legacy activations only)	Personal	Yes	Yes	Yes	Yes, on Truly Unlimited plans, but "Video Streams at up to 480p", "If congested, customers may notice reduced speeds vs. T-Mobile customers that may be further reduced for small number of customers who use >40 GB." [sic], and phone hotspot limited to 10 GB	Yes, 2G speeds after up to 15 GB (or 10 GB starting October 2019) 4G LTE data	?	Yes, but no unlimited data?	Yes, int'l calling, unlimited texting, and roaming in Mexico and several Central and South American countries	Yes	Owned by Verizon.
Sparklight Mobile	AT&T, Verizon	Personal	?	?	?	?	?	?	?	?	?	Owned by Cable One
Spectrum Mobile	Verizon	Personal, Business	Yes	Yes, through the Spectrum One bundle giving you access to Spectrum Internet	Yes	Yes, but Unlimited plans are slowed to 1Mbit/s at 30 GB max/480p video Unlimited Plus plans are slowed to 1Mbit/s at 50 GB max/720p video	Yes	Yes, with compatible device.	Yes, but after 5 GB of fast data usage on unlimited plans and 10GB of fast data usage on unlimited plus plans, speeds are reduced to 600 kbit/s	Yes, int'l calling, unlimited texting, and roaming	Yes	Owned by Charter Communications. Tablet and wearable plans available. T-Mobile network available to business customers only.
SpeedTalk Mobile	T-Mobile	Personal	Yes	No?	Yes, BYOD-only	No, plans capped at 2 GB max	No?	Yes, compatible devices only	No, but "working hard on getting this on board"	Yes, int'l calling from U.S.	?	
Straight Talk	Verizon (New activations), AT&T (Legacy activations only), T-Mobile (Legacy activations only)	Personal	Yes	Yes	Yes	Yes, on Ultimate Unlimited plan, but "At 60 GB, we reserve the right to review your account for usage in violation of Straight Talk's terms and conditions." On AT&T Hotspot is prohibited.	Yes, 2G speeds	Yes	No	Yes, int'l calls from U.S. to >1000 landline destinations, and to mobile phones in Canada, China, India, and Mexico	Yes	Owned by Verizon. Tablet plans available. Rooted or jailbroken devices not allowed.
TAG Mobile	AT&T	Lifeline: AZ, AR, CA, CO, IA, KY, LA, ME, MD, MI, MN, MO, NV, OK, PA, SC, TX, WV and WI, Personal	Yes		Yes	No, all data plans include a limit (CAP) on the amount of data a subscriber can use.	No	Yes		Yes		Owned by Tag Mobile LLC.
TDS Mobile	AT&T, Verizon	Personal	?	?	?	?	?	?	?	?	?	Owned by TDS Telecom.
Tello Mobile	T-Mobile	Personal	Yes	Yes?	Yes	No, plans capped at 50 GB max	Yes, 2G speeds on unlimited plan only, but not for phone hotspot	Yes, with compatible device.	Yes, but no Unlimited: disabled after 4G data allotment is depleted	Yes, int'l calls and texts from U.S. No service in Alaska.	Yes	Owned by KeepCalling. Tello originally used the Sprint network, but transitioned to using the T-Mobile network after the T-Mobile and Sprint merger.
TerraCom Wireless	Verizon	Lifeline: AR, AZ, CO, IN, IL, IA, KS, LA, ME, MD, MN, MO, NE, NV, OK, PA, RI, TX, WA, WV, and WI; Personal	Yes	No	Yes	No, plans capped at 4.5 GB maximum	Yes	?				
TextNow	T-Mobile	Personal	Yes	No?	Yes	No, plans capped at 23 GB max	Yes, but only on Sprint network	?	Yes(?), but only on Sprint network	Yes, int'l calling from U.S. and Canada, unlimited texting to >100 countries	Yes, but via TextNow app, not natively?	Owned by TextNow. Uses Wi-Fi and wireless network.
Ting Mobile	Verizon	Personal	Yes	Yes	Yes	No	Yes, but only on handset, it is reduced to 2G speeds after allotment	Yes	Yes, but cutoff once hotspot allocation is reached	Yes, int'l calling, texting, and roaming. Limited data service in Alaska.	Yes	Owned by Tucows.
Total Wireless	Verizon	Personal	Yes	Yes(capped at 5 or 15gb, or capped at 5mbps depending on plan)	Yes	Yes	Yes, on legacy plans; 2G speeds	Yes	Yes	Yes, int'l calling from U.S. with Global ILD add-on	Yes	Owned by Verizon.
Tracfone	Verizon (New activations), AT&T (Legacy activations only), T-Mobile (Legacy activations only)	Personal	Yes	No	Yes	Yes(Verizon network only)	No, plans do not slow and are cutoff upon reaching limits	Yes	Yes, carried over data can be used for tethering too, unlimited plan capped at 15GB	Yes, int'l calling from U.S.	Yes	Owned by Verizon. Previously owned América Móvil.
Troomi Wireless	AT&T, Verizon	Personal, Family	Yes	No	No	No	Yes	Yes	No	No	?	Plans are designed for kids and intentionally restrictive
TruConnect	T-Mobile, Verizon	Lifeline: 32 states and territories, Personal	Yes	Yes	Yes for non-Lifeline	Yes for non-Lifeline	No	?	Yes	Yes	?	Owned by Sage Telecom. No FAQ section.
Trump Mobile	T-Mobile	Personal	Yes	No?	Yes	No plan maxes out at 20GB	No. Data is shut off when limit is reached	Yes	Yes	Yes? Calls to 100 countries	Yes	Managed by Liberty Wireless
Twigby Mobile	Verizon	Personal, Business	Yes	No?	Yes	No, plans capped at 20 GB max	Yes, 2G speeds: ~64 kbit/s	Yes	Yes	Yes, calls to ~80 countries and texts to ~180 countries from U.S. for no additional charge	Yes	Operates on Verizon towers.
Ultra Mobile	T-Mobile	Personal	Yes	No?	Yes	No, plans capped at 50 GB max	Yes, 2G speeds?	?	Yes, though "Full speeds available up to monthly allotment, including tethering, then slowed up to 2G speeds for remainder of service period" may indicate that phone hotspot ceases functioning after fast data is depleted	Yes, unlimited calling to >80 destinations, int'l texting, int'l roaming	Yes, and texting	Owned by T-Mobile.
Unreal Mobile	AT&T, T-Mobile	Personal	Yes	Yes	Yes	No	Yes, 2G speeds	?	No	Yes, int'l calling, with appropriate plan	Yes, but via Unreal Mobile app, not natively	Owned by Red Pocket Mobile. Previously owned by FreedomPop. On AT&T network, all calling is via VoIP.
US Mobile	AT&T, T-Mobile, Verizon	Personal, Business	Yes	Yes, Unlimited WiFi hotspots and inflight WiFi.	Yes	Yes*, Dark Star Truly Unlimited Data, Warp & Light Speed either Truly Unlimited or Throttled after 10GB, or 70GB depending on plan.	Yes, 3G speeds on unlimited data plans after premium data is used up.	Yes	Yes, Included in some plans or for an additional fee depending on plan	Free with Unlimited Premium, available for regional and country-specific purchase for other plans, eSim required.	Yes	Owned by Ahmed Khattak. Unlimited plans with discounts and Perks with 3 or more lines.
Visible by Verizon	Verizon	Personal	Yes	No	Yes: iPhones 6, original SE, and up; Google Pixel 3 and up; some Samsung, Motorola, ZTE, LG, OnePlus, and Hot Pepper phones also official BYOD devices. Some unofficially compatible devices might also work either right away when the sim is activated and inserted, or with some setting changes (like trying to add VSBLINTERNET APN), or with limited features.	Yes. No usage-based throttling Unlimited de-prioritized data which yields somewhat inconsistent speeds ranging from over 500 Mbit/s in a great Verizon LTE non congested area to less than 1 Mbit/s in a substantially congested Verizon area "However, when the network gets congested, your data could slow up for a bit."	—N/a	Yes, Access to Verizon nationwide 5g and UWB (mm wave) 5g capped at 200 Mbit/s, however the speed cap is not strictly enforced.	Yes, Unlimited hotspot; Speeds capped at 5-15 Mbit/s, depending on plan tier.	Yes: At all plan tiers: Unlimited incoming international calls and texts. While in the US, unlimited outgoing calls and texts to Canada and Mexico. At middle tier and up: Unlimited talk, text, and data while roaming in Canada and Mexico. At top tier: 500 minutes/month of calls to 85+ countries, and unlimited texting to 200+ countries.	Yes	Owned by Verizon. Operates on Verizon's native 4G/LTE network and WiFi calling (no 3G – Verizon will shut this down at the end of 2020 anyway or roaming- some reports of LTEiRA roaming with talk and text). No toll-free customer service #; service provided via in-app chat, text, Facebook, or Twitter; callbacks by request. Visible Connect assists nonprofit technology startups. With party pay it's exactly $25 a month taxes&fees included.
WOW! Mobile	T-Mobile, Verizon	Personal	?	?	?	?	?	?	?	?	?	Owned by WideOpenWest.
Walmart Family Mobile	Verizon (New activations), T-Mobile (Legacy activations only)	Family	Yes	No?	Yes	Yes, on Truly Unlimited plan, but tethering limited to 5 GB on this plan; "Video typically streams at DVD quality"	Yes, 2G speeds, after up to 14 GB 4G LTE data	Yes	Yes, but unclear if tethering continues to function after 4G data is depleted	Yes, with Extras Pack: int'l calling, and roaming in Canada, the Dominican Republic, and Mexico only	Yes	Owned by Verizon. Acquired from T-Mobile. Family plans with discounts for up to 4 additional lines.
Wing	AT&T, T-Mobile, Verizon	Personal, Business	Yes	No?	Yes	Yes, on TM Unlimited plan (limited-time offer), but on the AT&T Unlimited plan it is network managed at 22 GB and stopped at 50 GB.	Yes, 2G speeds, but on Sprint network only	?	Yes	Yes, int'l calling, texting, and voice + data roaming	Yes	Tablet plans not offered.
Xfinity Mobile	Verizon	Personal, Business	Yes	No	Yes, but Apple and certain Android models only	No, plans capped at 20 GB max	Yes, on Unlimited plan	Yes	Yes	Yes, int'l calling, texting, and roaming	Yes	Owned by Comcast Corporation. Activation available to Xfinity Internet customers. $25/month per line if not an Xfinity Internet customer. Tablet and Smart Watch plans available. T-Mobile network available to business customers only.
Xtream Mobile	Verizon	Personal	?	?	?	?	?	?	?	?	?	Owned by Mediacom.
Zing Wireless	AT&T, T-Mobile, Verizon	Personal	Yes	No?	Yes	No, plans capped at 8 GB max	No?	?	No?	Yes, int'l calling, texting, and roaming(?)	?	

== Wireless mobile broadband operators ==
The following table is a list of wireless mobile broadband operators.

Company	Host network(s)	Market	Phone service	Modem service	BYOD	Unlimited fast data	Unlimited slow data	5G access	Tethering / phone hotspot	International	Native Wi-Fi calling	Notes
DataJack	T-Mobile, Verizon	Personal	No	Yes				?	—N/a		—N/a	
Internet on the Go	T-Mobile, Verizon	Personal	No	Yes				?	—N/a		—N/a	Owned by TruConnect.
NetBuddy	AT&T, T-Mobile, Verizon	Personal	No	Yes				?	—N/a		—N/a	
OTR Mobile	AT&T, T-Mobile, Verizon	Personal	No	Yes	Yes	Yes	—N/a	?	—N/a	No?	—N/a	No Terms & Conditions page ("Updating policy. Will be posted soon.").
Ladybug Wireless	AT&T, T-Mobile, Verizon	Personal, Business	No(?), "Check back soon"	Yes	No(?), "Check back soon"	Yes, but prohibited are video streaming above SD (must be manually limited), "large" downloads, hosting servers, etc.	No	?	No	No	No	Founded to provide high-speed Internet service to rural customers.

== International SIM voice and data service operators ==
All MVNOs listed below are BYOD, unless otherwise noted.

Company	Host network	Wireless technology	Notes
POND Mobile	T-Mobile	UMTS, LTE, 5G	
ChatSim	AT&T, Sprint, Verizon	UMTS, CDMA, LTE	Unlimited messaging with 10 apps in >160 countries.
Flexiroam	AT&T, Sprint, Alaska Wireless	UMTS, CDMA, LTE	Apple eSIM supported Worldwide Service Provider
Get Mobile	Depends on region	LTE, 5G	Apple/Android/Windows and Connected Car eSIM Supported. Can pay by day, weeks or month. Multi-region is available to allow customers to use the same service in multiple countries.
KnowRoaming	Telna	GSM	
OneSimCard	AT&T & T-Mobile	2G/3G/4G/5G	
Telna	Telna	GSM	
TravelSim	AT&T	UMTS	
TravelSim	T-Mobile	GSM & UMTS	
Truphone	AT&T	UMTS	Apple eSIM supported Worldwide Service Provider
Truphone	T-Mobile	GSM & UMTS	Apple eSIM supported Worldwide Service Provider
Ubigi	Various	Various	Apple/Android/Windows and Connected Car eSIM Supported. Pronounced You-bee-gee. Subsidiary of Transatel. Operates on MNC 901-37. />
Saily	Various	4G/5G	Apple/Android/Windows supported Worldwide Service Provider, available in 190+ countries.

== IoT service providers ==
IoT is "Internet of Things", the extension of Internet connectivity (in this case, cellular network–based) into physical devices and everyday objects.

Company	Host network	Wireless technology	Notes
Aeris Communications Inc	AT&T, T-Mobile, Vodafone	CDMA, LTE, GSM & UMTS	
Atomic Mobile	AT&T, Verizon, and T-Mobile	LTE, 5G	
Datablaze	AT&T, Verizon, T-Mobile, Rogers	LTE, 5G, LTE-M	
Get Mobile	AT&T, T-Mobile, Verizon	LTE, 5G	
KORE Wireless	AT&T, Verizon, T-Mobile, Vodafone, Rogers, Telstra, Telefónica	CDMA, LTE, GSM, UMTS	
MasTrack (Mobile Asset Solutions)	AT&T, Verizon, T-Mobile	CDMA, LTE, GSM, UMTS	
NTT DOCOMO USA	AT&T, Verizon, T-Mobile, Vodafone, Telstra, NTT DOCOMO	CDMA, LTE, GSM, UMTS	
POND Mobile	T-Mobile	GSM, UMTS, LTE, LTE-M, 5G	
OneSimCard IoT	AT&T, T-Mobile, Verizon, Bell, Rogers, Telus	2G/3G/4G (Full LTE & Cat-M and NB-IoT) 5G	
Sierra Wireless	AT&T, Verizon, T-Mobile, Vodafone, Rogers, Telefónica	CDMA, LTE, GSM, UMTS	
Solve Networks	AT&T, Verizon, T-Mobile	CDMA, LTE, GSM, UMTS	
Telit	AT&T, Verizon, T-Mobile, Rogers, Tele2, Telefónica	CDMA, LTE, GSM, UMTS	
Telna	AT&T, T-Mobile, Verizon	GSM	
Twilio	T-Mobile	CDMA, LTE, GSM, UMTS	
US Mobile	T-Mobile, Verizon	CDMA, LTE, GSM, UMTS	

== Defunct, merged, and acquired operators ==
Company	Market	Host network	Wireless technology	End date	Notes
7-Eleven Speak Out Wireless	Personal	AT&T, Sprint	CDMA, GSM, & UMTS	2010	
Amp'd Mobile	Personal	Verizon	GSM & UMTS	2014	
Aio Wireless	Personal	AT&T	GSM & UMTS	2007	Owned by AT&T.
AirLink Mobile	Personal	Sprint	CDMA	?	
Blue Jay Wireless	Lifeline: CA	Sprint, Verizon	CDMA & LTE	2018	Defunct.
Brightspot	Personal	T-Mobile	GSM & UMTS	December 2015	
Boost Infinite	Personal	Dish, AT&T, T-Mobile	LTE & NR	July 2024	Merged into Boost Mobile on July 17, 2024.
Budget Mobile	Lifeline: CA	Sprint, Verizon	CDMA & LTE	April 2017	Defunct.
BYO Wireless	Personal	T-Mobile, Verizon	CDMA, GSM, UMTS, & LTE	2015	
BZRMobile	Personal	Sprint	CDMA & LTE		
Caffee Communications	Personal	Verizon	CDMA & LTE	March 2018	
Charge	Personal	Sprint	CDMA & LTE	June 2017	
Circle-K Talk-and-Go	Personal	AT&T	GSM & UMTS	2011	
Cloven	Personal	Sprint	CDMA & LTE		
Comcast	Personal	Clearwire, Sprint	CDMA	2011	
Common Cents Mobile	Personal	Sprint	CDMA	2011	
Cox	Personal	Sprint	CDMA	2012	
DataPass	Personal	Sprint, T-Mobile, Verizon	CDMA, GSM, LTE, UMTS	March 2019	Defunct.
Disney Mobile	Personal	Sprint	CDMA	2007	
EarthLink	Personal	Sprint	WiMAX	2015	
Embarq	Personal	Sprint	CDMA	2009	
enVie Mobile	Personal	Verizon	CDMA & LTE	March 2017	
Español Mobile	Personal	Sprint	CDMA & LTE	?	
ESPN MVP	Personal	Sprint	CDMA	2006	
Expo Mobile	Personal	Sprint, Verizon	CDMA & LTE	?	Essentially no information about Expo's services available on their site, just a bunch of broken links, including the "Contact us today!" link. Firefox displays security warning about website's use of self-signed SSL certificate that expired 2018-02-14.
FamilyTalk Wireless	Personal	AT&T, Sprint, Verizon	UMTS, CDMA & LTE	2017	
FeelSafe Wireless	Personal Lifeline	AT&T	UMTS, GSM & LTE	2020	Only left abandoned Facebook page
FordMobile	Personal	MarkFordMobile	GSM, LTE & UMTS	2018	
Firefly Mobile	Personal	AT&T	GSM & UMTS	2012	
FMP Wireless	Personal	Verizon	CDMA & LTE	2017	
Fuzion Mobile	Personal	AT&T	GSM & UMTS	2013	
GIV Mobile	Personal	T-Mobile	GSM & UMTS	31 January 2016	
GTC Wireless	Personal	AT&T	GSM & UMTS	2009	
Hello US Mobile	Personal	T-Mobile, Verizon	CDMA, GSM, & UMTS	?	
Helio	Personal	Sprint	CDMA	2010	
Infinium Wireless	Personal	Sprint, T-Mobile, Verizon	CDMA, GSM, LTE & UMTS	2017	
iQ Cellular	Personal	AT&T, Sprint, Verizon	CDMA	2014	
Itel UTel	Personal	Sprint	CDMA & LTE		
Jaguar Mobile	Personal	T-Mobile	GSM, LTE & UMTS	?	
Jump Mobile	Personal	Cricket	CDMA	2010	
KDDI Mobile	Personal	AT&T (originally Sprint)	GSM	January 2019	Locus Telecommunications and the U.S. MVNOs under its umbrella were acquired from KDDI America in January 2019.
Lucky Wireless	Personal	Verizon	CDMA	2011	
Mi Gente Mobile	Personal	Sprint	CDMA & LTE	2013	
Mingo Wireless	Personal	Sprint	CDMA	2012	
MOSH Mobile	Personal	Centennial Wireless	GSM & UMTS	2012	
Movida	Personal	Sprint	CDMA	2012	
Omni Prepaid	Personal			2012	
Millenicom	Personal	Verizon, T-Mobile, AT&T, US Cellular	5G, 4G, LTE	Current	Terabyte of High Speed Data over 4 major carriers simultaneously.
Next G Mobile	Personal	Verizon	CDMA	2013	
The People's Operator USA	Personal	Sprint, T-Mobile	CDMA, LTE	February 2019	Ceased operations in the wake of financial problems and legal scandals.
Phonata	Personal	AT&T, Sprint, Verizon	CDMA, GSM, & UMTS	2013	
PrepaYd Wireless	Personal	Sprint	CDMA	2014	
PTel Mobile	Personal	T-Mobile	GSM & UMTS	31 January 2016	
Pure Mobile	Personal	Verizon	GSM & UMTS	2012	
Pure Unlimited	Personal	AT&T	GSM	unknown	Defunct no-data-service MVNO; "Order Today" page suggests customers switch to sister company Pure Talk.
Q Link Wireless	Personal	T-Mobile			Owned by Quadrant Holdings LLC. Pleaded guilty to “conspiring to defraud and commit offenses (…) in connection with a years-long scheme to steal over $100 million” from the Lifeline federal program.
Qwest Wireless	Personal	Sprint	CDMA	2010	
Red Stick Wireless	Personal	Sprint, T-Mobile, Verizon	CDMA, GSM, LTE	circa February 2019?	As of August 2019, site permanently displays "This site is currently in a maintenance window".
Republic Wireless	Personal	AT&T, T-Mobile	GSM, UMTS, LTE	2023	Customers transitioned to Boost Infinite.
Ring Plus, Inc	Personal	Sprint	CDMA & LTE	21 February 2017	Customers absorbed by Ting Mobile in February, 2017.
Roam Mobility	Personal	T-Mobile	GSM & LTE	30 June 2020	Shutdown June 30, 2020.
ROK Mobile	Personal	AT&T	GSM	October 2018	ROK ceased offering Sprint and Verizon service in May 2018. ROK website went blank circa October 2018. ROKMobile.com SSL certificate expired April 5, 2019.
Shaka Mobile	Personal	Sprint	CDMA		
Simple Freedom	Personal	Alltel	CDMA	2007	Customers in Colorado, Oklahoma, Texas, Louisiana, Alabama, Mississippi, New Mexico, Georgia, & Florida moved over to Verizon prepaid. All other markets flipped to AT&T Mobility.
SkyView Wireless	Personal	AT&T	GSM	?	As of July 2019, SkyView is no longer accepting new customers, and website only offers links to login forms for h2o and easyGO, and a link for existing SkyView customers to recharge.
Solavei	Personal	T-Mobile	GSM & UMTS	December 2015	
Spot Mobile	Personal	T-Mobile	GSM & UMTS	September 7, 2014	
STi Mobile	Personal	Sprint	CDMA	?	
SWT Mobile	Personal	AT&T	GSM & UMTS	2013	
TalkForGood	Personal	Verizon	CDMA	2013	
Total Call Mobile	Personal	Sprint	CDMA	?	
Touch Mobile	Personal	Sprint	CDMA & LTE	?	
Trumpet Mobile	Personal	Sprint	CDMA	2013	
TúYo Mobile	Personal	T-Mobile	GSM & UMTS	2012	
Univision Mobile	Personal	T-Mobile	GSM, UTMS & LTE	2017	Absorbed by Ultra Mobile in July 2017.
UppWireless	Personal	T-Mobile	GSM & UMTS	2016	
UVA Mobile	Personal	T-Mobile	GSM, UMTS & LTE	2017	
UWT Mobile	Personal	AT&T, Sprint, T-Mobile	GSM, CDMA, UMTS & LTE	?	
Value Wireless	Personal	T-Mobile	GSM	?	Content area of website's main page is blank. About page contains "Lorem ipsum" placeholder text. Contact Us page is missing. No phones, BYOD, or plans pages.
Venn Mobile	Personal	Sprint	CDMA & LTE	2020	In June 2020, they had all customers lines terminated, due to their inability to pay their(Venn Mobile's) bill to Sprint. Was over 3 months past-due, totally over $60,000. Blamed "outage" on the Sprint/T-Mobile merger. Their sister company Teltik is no longer taking new customers either.
Virgin Mobile USA	Personal	Sprint	CDMA	February 2020	In February 2020, the Virgin Mobile USA service was discontinued and the existing Virgin Mobile customers were transferred to Boost Mobile.
Voce	Personal	AT&T	GSM & UMTS	1 February 2008	
Votel Mobile	Personal	Sprint	CDMA	2014	
Voyager Mobile	Personal	Sprint	CDMA	2015	
Wireless Services US	Personal	Verizon	CDMA & LTE	July 2017	
WOW Mobile PCS	Personal	Sprint	CDMA	2012	
XCellular USA	Personal	Sprint	CDMA & LTE	25 July 2014	
XE Mobile	Personal	?	?	2007	
Yahoo Mobile	Personal	Verizon	CDMA, LTE, 5G	31 August 2021	On June 17, 2021, Yahoo Mobile sent email messages to customers telling them about the shutdown. Customers were told they had until August 31, 2021 to port out and were urged to transfer over to Visible.
ZACT	Personal	Sprint	CDMA & LTE	3 August 2014	
Zapp	Personal	Sprint	CDMA	2012	
ZERO11 Wireless	Personal	AT&T	UMTS	?	
ZUMA Prepaid	Personal	Sprint	CDMA	2013	

== See also ==
- List of mobile network operators in the United States
- List of mobile network operators of the Americas § United States
