= List of mobile network operators in the United States =

This is a list of mobile network operators (MNOs) operating in the United States. The Cellular Telecommunications & Internet Association (CTIA) lists approximately 30 facilities-based wireless service providers in the United States as members. Competitive Carriers Association (CCA) has over 1000 members. Aside from the facilities-based providers, there are over 50 virtual operators that use the top three networks to provide service.

== Big three American wireless providers ==
The big three wireless telecommunications facilities-based service providers by subscriber count in the United States are:

Largest American wireless providers
Company	Subscribers	Date/Source
Verizon	▲147.0 million	Q2 2026
T-Mobile US	▲143.3 million	Q2 2026 (Note: T-Mobile US no longer reports total subscribers in their earnings reports as of Q1 2026.)
AT&T Mobility	▲121.4 million	Q2 2026 (Note: AT&T no longer reports wholesale subscribers in their earnings reports as of Q1 2026.)

== Technologies used ==
The big three wireless providers have standardized on 4G LTE and 5G NR as their wireless communication standards and have enabled VoLTE and VoNR on their networks. AT&T, T-Mobile, and Verizon also sell SIM cards through their retail channels, both in-store and online.

The three largest wireless providers operate nationwide networks covering most of the U.S. population, while smaller carriers serve particular regions and may supplement their coverage through roaming agreements.

== Facilities-based service providers ==
The following tables list service providers that own and operate their network infrastructure. Unless otherwise specified, subscriber counts include customers of virtual network operators hosted on their networks.

=== Active Mobile Network Operators (MNOs) in the Contiguous United States ===
Operator	Voice technology	Data technology	Subscribers (in millions)	Coverage (excluding roaming)	Ownership
Appalachian Wireless	VoLTE	LTE	0.138 (February 2021)	KY, WV	East Kentucky Network, LLC
AT&T Mobility •Includes FirstNet by AT&T and Cricket Wireless	VoLTE, VoNR, VoIP, Wi-Fi calling	LTE, NR	121.4 (Q2 2026)	Contiguous US; AK, HI	AT&T Inc.
Big River Broadband	VoLTE	LTE	Unknown	MO	Big River Telephone
Bravado Wireless	VoLTE	LTE	Unknown	OK	Cross Communications
C Spire	VoLTE, Wi-Fi calling	LTE, NR	1.2 (May 2016)	MS, TN, FL, AL	Telapex, Inc.
Cellcom	VoLTE, Wi-Fi calling	LTE, 5G NR	0.3 (July 2013)	WI	NSight Telservices
Cellular One of North East Arizona	VoLTE	LTE	0.1 (July 2018)	AZ, CO, NM, UT	Smith Bagley Inc.
Colorado Valley Communications	VoLTE	LTE	Unknown	TX	Colorado Valley Telephone Coop
Custer Telephone Cooperative	VoLTE	LTE	Unknown	ID	Custer Telephone Cooperative, Inc
DTC Wireless	VoLTE	LTE	Unknown	TN	Advantage Cellular Systems, Inc.
Evolve Broadband	VoLTE	LTE	Unknown	TX	Worldcall Interconnect Inc.
FTC Wireless	VoLTE	LTE, NR	Unknown	SC	Farmers Telephone Cooperative Inc.
Infrastructure Networks	VoLTE	LTE	Unknown	TX, ND	Infrastructure Networks, Inc.
Inland Cellular	VoLTE	LTE	0.013(July 2013)	WA, ID	Inland Cellular
Limitless Mobile	UMTS	HSPA+, LTE	Unknown	PA	Limitless Mobile, LLC
Sagebrush Cellular	CDMA2000	EV-DO, LTE	0.012	MT, ND	Nemont Telephone Cooperative
Nex-Tech Wireless	VoLTE	LTE, 5G NR	Unknown	KS	Nex-Tech
NNTC Wireless	CDMA2000	EV-DO	Unknown	CO	Nucla Naturita Telephone Company
Northern Pacific Wireless	VoIP, Wi-Fi calling	802.11EX Hybrid Data Transfer	Unknown	CA	NorthernPW LLC.
NVC	CDMA2000	EV-DO, LTE	0.01	SD	James Valley Telecommunications
Pine Belt Wireless	VoLTE	LTE	Unknown	AL	Pine Belt Communications
Pine Cellular	GSM, UMTS	EDGE, HSPA+, LTE	Unknown	OK	Pine Cellular, Inc
PTCI	GSM, UMTS	EDGE, HSPA+, LTE	Unknown	OK	Panhandle Telecommunication Systems, Inc
Redzone Wireless	VoLTE	LTE	Unknown	ME	Redzone Wireless, LLC
Rock Wireless	UMTS	HSPA+, LTE	Unknown	ND, SD	Standing Rock Telecom (Tribally Owned)
RTC Communications	VoLTE	LTE	Unknown	IN	RTC Communications, LLC
Silver Star Communications	VoLTE	LTE	Unknown	WY	Silver Star Telephone Company, Inc
Snake River PCS	VoLTE	LTE	Unknown	OR	Eagle Telephone System
Southern Linc	VoLTE	LTE	0.17 (April 2011)	AL, GA, MS, FL	Southern Company
STRATA Networks	VoLTE	LTE	Unknown	UT, WY, CO	Uintah Basin Electronics Telecommunications, Inc.
Tampnet	VoLTE	LTE	Unknown	Gulf of Mexico	Tampnet
Thumb Cellular	VoLTE	LTE	0.037	MI	Agri-Valley Communications
T-Mobile US •Includes Metro by T-Mobile, Assurance Wireless, Mint Mobile and Ultra Mobile	VoLTE, VoNR, VoIP, Wi-Fi calling	LTE, NR	143.3 (Q2 2026)	Contiguous US; HI, PR, VI	Deutsche Telekom AG (53.4%); SoftBank Group Corporation (7.6%)
Union Wireless	UMTS	HSPA+, LTE	0.041	WY, CO	Union Telephone
United Wireless	VoLTE	LTE, NR	0.022 (Sep 2016)	KS	United Wireless Communications, Inc.
Verizon •Includes Verizon Value and Visible by Verizon	VoLTE, VoNR, VoIP, Wi-Fi calling	LTE, NR	147.0 (Q2 2026)	Contiguous US; AK, HI	Verizon Communications Inc.
Viaero Wireless	UMTS, VoLTE	HSPA+, LTE	0.110	CO, KS, NE, SD, WY	Northeast Colorado Cellular, Inc.
VTel Wireless	VoLTE	LTE	Unknown	VT	Vermont Telephone Company, Inc.
WUE	VoLTE	LTE	Unknown	NV	Wue, Inc.

=== Active Mobile Network Operators (MNOs) in Hawaii ===
Operator	Voice technology	Data technology	Subscribers (in millions)	Coverage (excluding roaming)	Ownership
AT&T Mobility	VoLTE, VoNR, VoIP, Wi-Fi calling	LTE, NR	See above	Contiguous US; AK, HI	AT&T Inc.
T-Mobile	VoLTE, VoNR, VoIP, Wi-Fi calling	LTE, NR	See above	Contiguous US; HI, PR, VI	Deutsche Telekom AG (53%); SoftBank Group Corporation (7%)
Verizon	VoLTE, VoNR, VoIP, Wi-Fi calling	LTE, NR	See above	Contiguous US; AK, HI	Verizon Communications Inc.

=== Active Mobile Network Operators (MNOs) in Alaska ===
Operator	Voice technology	Data technology	Subscribers (in millions)	Coverage (excluding roaming)	Ownership
ASTAC	UMTS	HSPA+, LTE	Unknown	AK	The Arctic Slope Telephone Association Cooperative
AT&T Mobility	VoLTE, VoNR, VoIP, Wi-Fi calling	LTE, NR	See above	Contiguous US; AK, HI	AT&T Inc.
Bristol Bay Cellular Partnership	CDMA2000	EV-DO, LTE	Unknown	AK	BBTC Inc.
Copper Valley Telecom	VoLTE	LTE	Unknown	AK	Copper Valley Telephone Cooperative, Inc
Cordova Wireless	GSM, UMTS	EDGE, HSPA+, LTE	Unknown	AK	Cordova Telephone
GCI Wireless	GSM, UMTS, VoLTE	EDGE, HSPA+, LTE, NR	0.207 (Q1 2026)	AK	GCI Liberty Inc.
Ketchikan Public Utilities	CDMA2000	EV-DO, LTE	Unknown	AK	Ketchikan Public Utilities
OTZ Cellular	GSM	EDGE, LTE	Unknown	AK	OTZ Telephone Cooperative
TelAlaska Cellular	GSM	EDGE, LTE	Unknown	AK	American Broadband
Verizon	VoLTE, VoNR, VoIP, Wi-Fi calling	LTE, NR	See above	Contiguous US; AK, HI	Verizon Communications Inc.

=== Active Mobile Network Operators (MNOs) in Puerto Rico and United States Virgin Islands ===
Operator	Voice technology	Data technology	Subscribers (in millions)	Coverage (excluding roaming)	Ownership
Claro (formerly Verizon)	GSM, UMTS	EDGE, HSPA+, LTE	1.6 (Q2 2020)	PR	América Móvil
Liberty Puerto Rico (formerly AT&T)	VoLTE, Wi-Fi calling	LTE, NR	0.9 (Q3 2024)	PR, VI	Liberty Latin America
T-Mobile	VoLTE, VoNR, VoIP, Wi-Fi calling	LTE, NR	See above	Contiguous US; HI, PR, VI	Deutsche Telekom AG (53%); SoftBank Group Corporation (7%)
One Communications Guyana (formerly Viya)	GSM, UMTS	EDGE, HSPA+, LTE	Unknown	VI	ATN International (80%); Government of Guyana (20%)

=== Active Mobile Network Operators (MNOs) in Guam and Northern Mariana Islands ===
Operator	Voice technology	Data technology	Subscribers (in millions)	Coverage (excluding roaming)	Ownership
Docomo Pacific	VoLTE	LTE, NR	0.065	GU, MP	NTT Docomo
GTA	VoLTE	LTE, 5G	Unknown	GU	TeleGuam Holdings LLC
IT&E	VoLTE	LTE, NR	Unknown	GU, MP	IT&E Overseas, Inc

=== Active Mobile Network Operators (MNOs) in American Samoa ===
Operator	Voice technology	Data technology	Subscribers (in millions)	Coverage (excluding roaming)	Ownership
ASTCA	VoLTE	LTE, NR	Unknown	AS	Government of American Samoa
Bluesky	GSM, UMTS	EDGE, HSPA+, LTE	0.032	AS	Amper SpA

== Defunct, merged and acquired operators ==
Some operators listed below may still function as a separate brand but they no longer own any infrastructure (towers, network, etc.).

Operator	Voice technology	Data technology	Subscribers (millions)	End date	Notes
Airfire Mobile	GSM	EDGE	0.02	June 2014	Acquired by U.S. Cellular.
Alaska Communications	GSM, UMTS (legacy: CDMA2000)	EDGE, HSPA+, LTE (legacy: EV-DO)	0.103 (December 2014)	February 2015	Acquired by GCI
Alltel	CDMA	CDMA2000, EV-DO	13 (at peak)	September 2013	Acquired by Verizon Wireless and AT&T Mobility.
AT&T Wireless Services	GSM	EDGE	22	October 2004	Acquired by Cingular Wireless, which later rebranded to AT&T Mobility.
Big Sky Mobile	GSM	EDGE	Unknown	2017	Sold spectrum licenses to AT&T and T-Mobile and exited the business.
Blaze Wireless	GSM, UMTS	EDGE, HSPA+, LTE	Unknown	December 2019	Parent company, Pinpoint Communications, discontinued cellular service and spectrum leases through Viaero Wireless were cancelled.
Blue Wireless	CDMA2000	EV-DO, LTE	Unknown	July 2020	Exited business and sold spectrum licenses to Verizon.
Bluegrass Cellular	CDMA2000	EV-DO, LTE	0.210 (March 2021)	March 2021	Acquired by Verizon.
Boost Mobile	VoNR, Wi-Fi calling	NR	7.51	December 2025	Became an AT&T Mobility and T-Mobile US hybrid MVNO.
Breakaway Wireless	CDMA2000	EV-DO	Unknown	2018	Discontinued cellular service.
Carolina West Wireless	CDMA2000	EV-DO, LTE	0.08 (April 2013)	September 2026	Acquired by Verizon Wireless
Cellular One of East Central Illinois	GSM, UMTS	EDGE, HSPA+	Unknown	January 2016	Acquired by AT&T Mobility.
Cellular One of Northeast Pennsylvania	CDMA	CDMA2000, EV-DO	Unknown	March 2012	Acquired by Verizon Wireless.
Chariton Valley Wireless	CDMA2000	EV-DO, LTE	Unknown	2021	Acquired by Verizon Wireless
Chat Mobility	CDMA2000	EV-DO, LTE	Unknown	2021	Acquired by Verizon Wireless
Choice Wireless former Amerilink Wireless	GSM	EDGE	Unknown	2016	Became a T-Mobile US MVNO.
Choice Wireless ATN International	GSM, UMTS, VoLTE	EDGE, HSPA+, LTE	Unknown	December 2024	Choice Wireless (owned by Commnet) has stopped offering wireless service as of December 31, 2024.
Cincinnati Bell Wireless	GSM, UMTS, GAN Wi-Fi calling	EDGE, HSPA+	0.34 (January 2014)	February 2015	Spectrum assets acquired by Verizon Wireless, service to any customers remaining on the network was shut off after February 28, 2015.
Cleartalk affiliate of Clear Talk Wireless	CDMA2000	EV-DO, LTE	Unknown	2016	WGH Communications sold South Carolina licenses to T-Mobile US and exited the business
ClearTalk Wireless; Flat Wireless	CDMA2000	EV-DO, LTE	Unknown	2017	Flat Wireless assets acquired by Sprint.
Clearwire		WiMAX	11 (June 2012)	December 2013	Acquired by Sprint.
Corr Wireless	GSM	EDGE	0.02	2013	Acquired by AT&T Mobility.
CTC Wireless	CDMA2000	EV-DO, LTE	Unknown	2019	Exited wireless business.
DTC Wireless	GSM, UMTS	EDGE, HSPA+	Unknown	2017	Discontinued cellular service, though still offers fixed wireless service.
Element Mobile	CDMA2000	EV-DO	0.077 (August 2011)	2013	Acquired by AT&T Mobility.
Epic PCS	GSM	EDGE	Unknown	2015	Acquired by United Wireless and PTCI.
Farmers Mutual Telephone Company	CDMA2000	EV-DO, LTE	Unknown	2018	Sold spectrum licenses to Verizon Wireless and Eltopia Communications and became a Verizon Wireless MVNO.
Fuego Wireless		LTE	Unknown	2016	Sold network and spectrum licenses to AT&T and Infrastructure Networks
Golden State Cellular	CDMA2000	EV-DO	0.018	2014	Acquired by Verizon Wireless.
Illinois Valley Cellular	CDMA2000	EV-DO, LTE	Unknown	December 2023	Acquired by AT&T Mobility
Indigo Wireless	GSM, UMTS	EDGE, HSPA+, LTE	0.0004 (2023)	2023	Acquired by AT&T Mobility
iWireless	GSM, UMTS	EDGE, HSPA+, LTE	Unknown	2018	Acquired by T-Mobile US.
KTC PACE	GSM	EDGE	Unknown	2015	Became an AT&T Mobility MVNO.
Leap Wireless (Cricket Communications, Inc.) •Includes Cricket PAYGo & RadioShack No Contract Wireless	CDMA	EV-DO, LTE	4.57 (February 2014)	2014	Acquired by AT&T Mobility.
Long Lines Wireless	GSM	EDGE	0.018(November 2013)	December 2013	Acquired by AT&T Mobility
MTA Solutions	CDMA2000	EV-DO, LTE	Unknown	2017	Discontinued cellular service.
MetroPCS Communications, Inc.	CDMA	EV-DO, LTE	9.5	May 2013	Acquired by T-Mobile US.
Mid-Rivers Communications	CDMA2000	EV-DO, LTE	0.001	August 2019	Exited wireless business and sold network to Verizon Wireless.
miSpot		LTE	Unknown	November 2014	
mobi	VoNR, VoLTE	NR, LTE	0.055	November 2025	Went out of business
MobileNation	CDMA2000	EV-DO, LTE	0.02	January 2020	Exited wireless business.
Mosaic Telecom	UMTS	HSPA+, LTE	Unknown	2016	Discontinued cellular service
NEP Wireless	GSM	EDGE, LTE	0.011 (June 2010)	September 2015	
Nextel	iDEN	WiDEN	15 (Apr 2004)	2004	Acquired by Sprint.
NorthwestCell	CDMA2000	EV-DO, LTE	Unknown	December 2024	Exited wireless business, customers urged to switch to Verizon.
NMobile	CDMA2000	EV-DO	Unknown	June 2018	Discontinued cellular service.
nTelos	CDMA2000	EV-DO, LTE	0.300 (September 2015)	May 2016	Acquired by Shentel
Peoples Wireless	CDMA2000	EV-DO, LTE	Unknown	2015	
Phoenix Communications	GSM, UMTS	EDGE, HSPA	Unknown	2018	Sold to Hillary Communications and cellular service discontinued.
Pioneer Cellular	CDMA2000	EV-DO, LTE	0.06 (January 2014)	2023	Discountinued cellular service.
Plateau Wireless	GSM, UMTS	EDGE, HSPA+	0.042 (September 2014)	2014	Acquired by AT&T Mobility.
Pocket Communications	CDMA2000	1xRTT	Unknown	October 2010	Merged with Cricket.
PrimeCo Wireless	CDMA	Unknown	Unknown	1999	Became Verizon Wireless.
Revol Wireless	CDMA	CDMA2000, EV-DO	Unknown	January 2014	Sold spectrum licenses to Sprint. Subscribers transferred to Boost Mobile.
Shentel •T-Mobile Affiliate	VoLTE, Wi-Fi calling (legacy: CDMA2000)	LTE (legacy: EV-DO)	0.84 (July 2020)	July 2021	Wireless assets acquired by T-Mobile US.
Sprint Corporation •Including hosted virtual operators, and Boost Mobile	VoLTE, Wi-Fi calling (legacy: CDMA2000)	LTE, NR (legacy: EV-DO)	54.1 (December 2019)	April 2020	Merged with T-Mobile US on April 1, 2020.
Standing Rock Telecom	CDMA2000	EV-DO	Unknown	November 2014	Shut down CDMA for UMTS/LTE and rebranded to Rock Wireless
Stelera Wireless		HSPA	Unknown	April 2013	Defunct.
Syringa Wireless	CDMA2000	EV-DO, LTE	0.00135	December 2015	Discontinued cellular service
TerreStar	GSM	EDGE, HSPA	Unknown	2010	Acquired by Dish Network
Triangle Mobile	CDMA2000	EV-DO, LTE	Unknown	2021	Acquired by Verizon.
UScellular	VoLTE, Wi-Fi calling	LTE, NR	4.4 (Q1 2025)	August 2025	Acquired by T-Mobile
West Central Wireless •Including Right Wireless and Five Star Wireless	GSM, UMTS, VoLTE	EDGE, HSPA+, LTE	0.04 (November 2012)	August 2023	Acquired by Verizon.
Westlink Wireless	GSM	EDGE	Unknown	2013	Acquired by United Wireless.

== See also ==
- List of mobile virtual network operators in the United States
- List of CDMA2000 networks
- List of UMTS networks
- List of LTE networks
- List of mobile network operators
- List of mobile network operators of the Americas
- List of mobile network operators of the Asia Pacific region
