= ACG =

ACG may refer to:

== Science, technology, and health care ==
- A codon of threonine in genome expression
- Acoustocerebrography, a transcranial acoustic diagnostic method
- Alternating current generator, a type of electric generator
- American College of Gastroenterology, a professional association of gastroenterologists
- Angiocardiography, contrast radiography of the heart and great vessels
- Angle closure glaucoma, a type of glaucoma
- Anterior cingulate gyrus, a part of the cingulate cortex
- Apexcardiogram, a graphical recording of the pulsations of the chest wall over the apex of the heart

== Places ==
- Acocks Green railway station, in the UK, from its National Railway code
- Área de Conservación Guanacaste, a network of protected areas and a World Heritage site in northwestern Costa Rica
- Azeri-Chirag-Guneshli, an oilfield in the Caspian Sea

== Education and business organizations ==
- Academic Colleges Group, a New Zealand Educational Company
- Air Cargo Germany, a former cargo airline
- The Air Combat Group RAAF of the Royal Australian Air Force
- American College for Girls, now called Robert College, of Istanbul
- American College of Greece, an academic institution in Greece
- Associated Carrier Group, a US industry association of CDMA cellular network operators
- Association for Corporate Growth, an organization providing a global community for mergers and acquisitions and corporate growth professionals

== Entertainment ==
- ACG (subculture), Animation, Comics, and Games subculture in Greater China
- American Comics Group, a comic-book publisher in the Golden Age of comic books
- Ashby Computers & Graphics, video game developer trading as Ultimate Play the Game
- A Core Game, a Roblox "core" game

== Other uses ==
- Academic Competitiveness Grant, an assistance grant for college students in the US
- Atlético Clube Goianiense, a Brazilian football team
- All Conditions Gear (ACG), a Nike subdivision
