= AirTalk Wireless =

American telecommunications provider

- Formerly: FeelSafe Wireless (1999–2022)
- Type: Subsidiary
- Industry: Wireless Telecommunications
- Founded: 1999; 27 years ago
- Founder: Henry Hung Do
- Headquarters: Houston, Texas, U.S.
- Parent: AirVoice Wireless (1999–2021); HTH Communications (2021–present)
- Website: airtalkwireless.com

AirTalk Wireless (formerly FeelSafe Wireless) is an American telecommunications provider focusing on government assistance programs. AirTalk Wireless was found in 1999 by AirVoice Wireless with its headquarters in Houston, Texas. AirTalk Wireless offers wireless communication services across the US through the Lifeline program, which provides discounts on phone services for eligible low-income households.

== History ==
Founded in 1999 as FeelSafe Wireless, the company aimed to bridge the digital divide by providing communication solutions. In 2022, the company rebranded to AirTalk Wireless. Following the acquisition of its parent company, AirVoice Wireless, by HTH Communications in 2021, AirTalk Wireless became a subsidiary of HTH Communications.

AirTalk Wireless participates in this program, providing eligible U.S. citizens with free smartphones, talk, text, and data plans, as well as unlimited international calling to over 200 countries.

== The Lifeline program ==
The Lifeline program, established by the Federal Communications Commission (FCC) in 1985, offers discounted phone services for low-income households. On August 15, 2024, AirVoice was sued for violating the FCC's national do-not-call ("DNC") registry rules. On December 16, 2021, the FCC issued both a consent decree and a $100,000 fine against CEO Henry Hung Do's affiliated company NewPhone Wireless, LLC for committing additional Lifeline violations. Prior to that, on December 22, 2017, the FCC issued both a consent decree and a $55,000 fine against Do's affiliated company Cintex Wireless, LLC for further Lifeline-related violations.

=== Eligibility ===
To qualify for AirTalk Wireless services, individuals must meet specific income requirements or be enrolled in federal or state assistance programs. Each household is limited to one Lifeline benefit, and users must make at least one call or text every 30 days to maintain active service.
