= Samsung SGH-T401G =

Mobile phone manufactured by Samsung

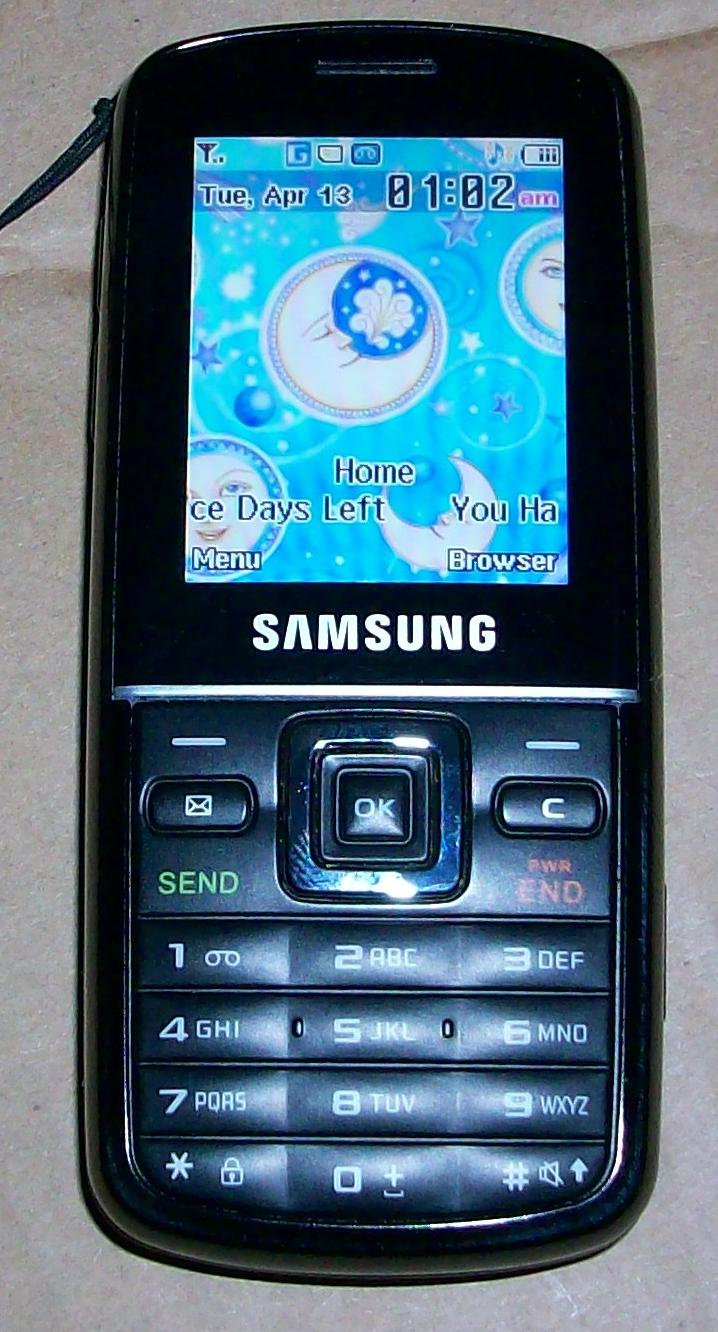
- Manufacturer: Samsung Electronics
- Type: Feature phone
- First released: December 2009
- Form factor: Slider
- Dimensions: 111.8 mm (4.40 in) H 50.8 mm (2.0 in) W 17.8 mm (0.70 in) D
- Weight: 4.34 oz (123 g)
- SIM: Mini-SIM
- Battery: User replaceable Li-ion
- Rear camera: 1.3 MP
- Display: 2.1 in (53 mm) TFT LCD, 176 × 220 px at 65K colors

Samsung SGH-T401G is a side slider messaging featurephone manufactured by Samsung for use on the U.S. GSM networks of Net10, TracFone Wireless, and Straight Talk.

== Hardware and features ==
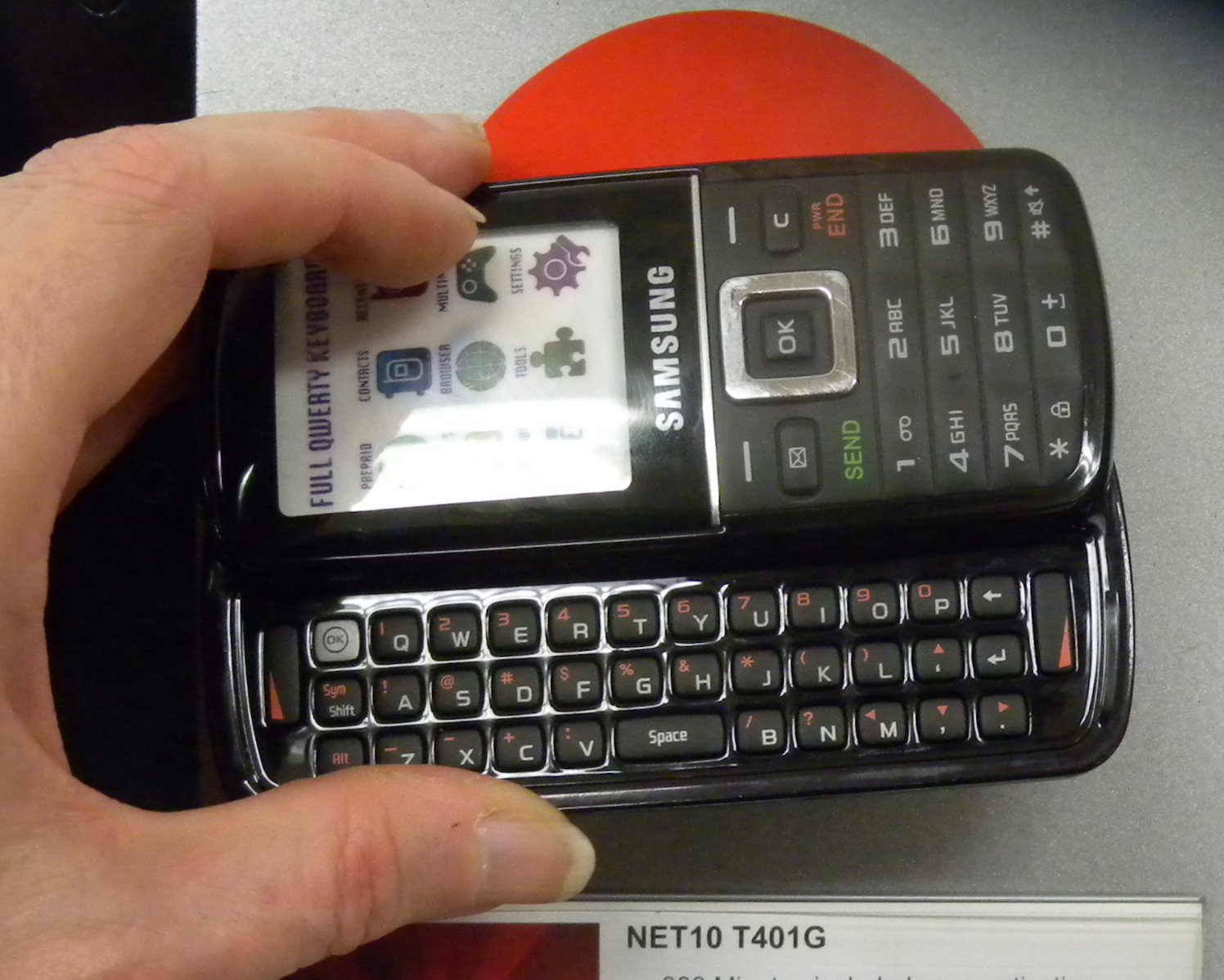
Open formation showing the QWERTY keyboard

The front of the phone has a traditional 23-key keypad consisting of twelve input keys and eleven function keys, of which one is dedicated for one-touch text messaging. The full 38-key QWERTY keyboard slides out to the left (pictured).

The back houses a 1.3 Mpix camera and video recorder. The device also includes support for Bluetooth, Stereo and a MicroSD card slot for music storage.

Software features include text and picture messaging, a web browser, and an MP3 player.
