= I-wireless (disambiguation) =

i-wireless or i wireless may refer to:

- i-wireless, a mobile virtual network operator owned by Cincinnati-based Kroger and affiliated with Sprint
- i-wireless, a former prepaid mobile phone brand owned by Cincinnati Bell Wireless
- iWireless, a mobile network operator in Iowa, Wisconsin, and Illinois affiliated with T-Mobile
- iWireless Center, a multi-purpose arena in Moline, Illinois
