= Super carrier =

Super carrier may refer to:

- Supercarrier, a nickname for the largest aircraft carriers
- Supercarrier (TV series), 1988
- US Mobile, an American mobile virtual network operator that nicknames itself "the Super Carrier"
