= TruConnect =

American mobile virtual network operator

- Industry: Wireless telecommunications
- Founded: 2011
- Founders: Matthew Johnson and Nathan Johnson (Co-CEOs)
- Headquarters: Los Angeles, CA
- Area served: Nationwide
- Products: Phones, mobile hotpots, wireless plans, Lifeline
- Website: TruConnect

TruConnect is an American mobile virtual network operator (MVNO) on T-Mobile and Verizon networks offering free phone service plans through Lifeline, as well as affordable prepaid mobile phone plans that include talk and text, 4G LTE/5G mobile data, and hotspot access.

It was the first prepaid broadband provider in the U.S. to offer a pay-as-you-go, portable Wi-Fi service plans.

== History ==
In 2006, Matthew and Nathan Johnson acquired Telscape Communications, rebranding the company as TruConnect. On April 29, 2015, TruConnect appeared as one of the fastest-growing wireless companies in the United States, according to data from the Universal Service Administrative Company. TruConnect has provided wireless, residential and small business telecommunication services under Sage Telecom, Telscape Communications and TruConnect Mobile brands.

== Lifeline ==
TruConnect is in partnership with a federal and state-funded Lifeline Program, overseen and managed by the FCC and USAC. It provides free or low-cost wireless service and free government phones to eligible low-income consumers, including those who participate in public assistance programs (such as SNAP and Medicaid, among others). This program provides these reduced-cost or free cell phone services to eligible households in most U.S. states; prepaid only services include OR, NM, NC, DE, CT, NH, and ME, as well as D.C. As of May 2016, the company had 195,751 Lifeline subscribers in California, a major market (under the branding Telscape Communications); in 2023 the CPUC listed TruConnect as the alternate Lifeline provider in CA (the primary being, TracFone).
