= Mobi (company) =

Hawaiʻi wireless carrier

mobi, Inc.
- Industry: wireless
- Predecessors: mobiPCS LLC; Coral Wireless LLC
- Founded: June 30, 2004; 22 years ago in Honolulu, Hawaiʻi
- Defunct: November 17, 2025; 11 months ago in Honolulu, Hawaiʻi
- Headquarters: Honolulu, Hawaiʻi, United States
- Area served: Hawaiʻi
- Key people: Justen Burdette, CEO
- Brands: mobi mobiPCS
- Services: wireless telecommunications services
- Number of employees: 120
- Website: mobi.com

mobi, Inc. was a wireless carrier founded in 2004 and based in Honolulu, Hawaiʻi. The company provided service on each of the major islands of Hawaiʻi, as well as on the mainland United States through roaming agreements with other carriers.

mobi is an operator member of the GSMA, the Competitive Carriers Association (the CCA), the CTIA, and the Pacific Telecommunications Council (PTC). Since 2022, workers at the company are represented by and members of the Communications Workers of America (the CWA).

The company reached a network sharing agreement with Verizon Wireless in 2015, with Sprint in 2019, and later announced a nationwide 5G partnership with T-Mobile in 2023, allowing it to continue to operate as a mobile network operator in Hawaiʻi but as a "full" mobile virtual network operator outside of its own footprint.

In late 2022, mobi became one of the first wireless carriers in the world to migrate its mobile core to the public cloud, through a partnership with AWS and startup WG2 (since acquired by Cisco). The following year, the carrier launched a CBRS network using technologies from Federated Wireless.

The company closed its retail operations in late 2025, with startup Minute Wireless acquiring its core and telecommunications infrastructure.

== History ==
mobi acquired wireless spectrum in the PCS band in 2004 and launched service covering Hawaiʻi in 2005. Doing business as mobiPCS, the company and MetroPCS were both backed by venture capital firm M/C Partners, with each disrupting the market in their respective regions by offering no contract, no credit check, unlimited wireless service before those became widespread options in the wireless industry. By 2008, mobi had opened eleven retail and seventy dealer locations throughout Hawaiʻi.

While the company launched with CDMA service (along with other members of the Associated Carrier Group) and had a roaming partnership with Sprint, it later transitioned to offering LTE and 5G wireless services.

The carrier operates its own retail stores in Hawaiʻi, and also has a small network of partner locations. To support customers digitally and outside of Hawaiʻi, mobi was the first wireless carrier in the United States to support mobile recurring payments and eSIM activation through its apps for iPhone with Apple Pay and Google Pay (payment method) for Android.

In 2023, the company adopted technology from startup RiPSIM, enabling mobi to become the first carrier to fully automate its end-to-end eSIM activation process, generating a dynamic eSIM profile, in real-time, at the time of activation, for each wireless subscription. The two companies demonstrated the technology at the AWS re:Invent conference that year, with RiPSIM launching it commercially in 2024.

== Labor relations ==
In 2022, its frontline and digital workers in Hawaiʻi, on the mainland United States, in Canada, and in México unionized with the Communications Workers of America, which the company voluntarily recognized despite the common trend of union busting in its industry.
