= Cellular Abroad =

Cellular Abroad, Inc.
- Industry: Wireless telecommunications
- Founded: 2002
- Headquarters: 5777 W. Century Blvd. Suite 1230, Los Angeles, California, U.S.
- Area served: United States and over 2100 countries worldwide
- Key people: Sebastian Harrison, President and CEO; Scott F. Nielsen, VP
- Products: Mobile telephony Wireless broadband services
- Number of employees: 10-20 (2012)
- Website: cellularabroad.com

Cellular Abroad is a mobile virtual network operator and internet retailer based in Los Angeles that uses GSM technology to provide international wireless voice, messaging and data services. Cellular Abroad sells and rents unlocked international GSM cell phones, portable WiFi hotspots and SIM Cards under the National Geographic Society brand.

== History ==
Cellular Abroad was founded in 2002 by Sebastian Harrison, son of cult film star and b-movie legend Richard Harrison and grandson of American International Pictures co-founder James H. Nicholson. After operating another successful internet company selling region-free DVD players, Sebastian saw similar market potential for international SIM Cards, and launched www.cellularabroad.com in October 2002, offering early tri-band frequency GSM cell phones and SIM Cards for 25 popular travel destinations.

Cellular Abroad became incorporated in 2004. To compete with the ever-changing mobile device market, Cellular Abroad changed their business model to mostly offer GSM cell phone rentals, and launched the Talk Abroad service for international travelers. The original 'Talk Abroad' SIM offered flat rates for use in over 70 countries, and free inbound calling to the SIM card on a Liechtenstein phone number.

In January 2007, Cellular Abroad negotiated a branding license with the National Geographic Society and went on to launch the National Geographic Talk Abroad Travel Phone, which offered a service similar to the original Talk Abroad SIM, but with a United Kingdom phone number and increased coverage in more than 100 countries.

April 2009 saw the release of the National Geographic Duet Phone; the first FCC approved dual-SIM card cell phone for the U.S. market.

Cellular Abroad started offering portable WiFi hotspots for international travelers in the fall of 2011.

== Products and services ==
Cellular Abroad owns and operates the National Geographic Talk Abroad Network, featuring U.K.-and U.S.-based phone numbers, and since 2011 has increased coverage to include more than 200 countries and territories. National Geographic Talk Abroad products include cell phones for rental or purchase and SIM Cards, available from their website.

Cellular Abroad also offers GSM quad band capable handsets with individual prepaid services for Europe, South America, North America, Africa, Asia and Australasia.

== See also ==
- List of United States wireless communications service providers
- Cloud9
