= MobileX =

American telecommunications company

Mobile X Global, Inc.
- Type: Private
- Industry: Telecommunications
- Founded: February 27, 2023; 3 years ago
- Founder: Peter Adderton
- Headquarters: Irvine, California, U.S.
- Services: Mobile virtual network operator
- Website: www.mymobilex.com

MobileX is a U.S.-based mobile virtual network operator (MVNO) that offers prepaid mobile phone services using artificial intelligence to optimize mobile data usage.

== History ==
The company was founded in 2023 by Peter Adderton, the founder of Boost Mobile. The company is headquartered in Orange County, California.

MobileX operates on the Verizon network. Its wireless service includes customizable plans that utilize artificial intelligence to predict and optimize users’ data needs. The platform supports eSIM for compatible devices and can be accessed via its mobile app on the Apple App Store or Google Play.

MobileX is available direct-to-consumer via its website, through a network of independent dealers and at approximately 3,700 Walmart stores across the United States.

== Awards and recognition ==
- In 2024, PCMag rated MobileX 4 out of 5 stars in its review of the service and awarded it an Editor’s Choice designation.
- Android Police noted the brand's "granular control over data usage and real-time plan adjustments," describing it as "a promising disruptor in the MVNO space."

== See also ==
- List of mobile virtual network operators in the United States
