= Associated Carrier Group =

Associated Carrier Group (ACG) is an industry association of US CDMA cellular network operators.

== Mission ==
ACG's stated mission is "to benefit both its members and the consumer by facilitating efficient production and marketing of devices as well as increased competition. The consortium enables its members to work with manufacturers, suppliers and other vendors to develop and procure, for its customers, scarce or unobtainable products in a timely fashion through economies of scale and standardization of coding and other features."

== Members ==
- Alaska Communications Systems (ACS)
- Alaska Digitel (GCI)
- Alltel (acquired by Verizon Wireless, some assets sold to AT&T and Atlantic Tele-Network)
- Appalachian Wireless
- Bluegrass Cellular acquired by Verizon Wireless
- Carolina West Wireless
- Cellcom
- Cellular One of Northeast Pennsylvania
- Cellular South became cSpire
- Copper Valley Wireless
- Cox Communications
- ETEX
- Golden State Cellular acquired by Verizon Wireless
- Illinois Valley Cellular
- Inland Cellular
- James Valley Wireless
- LEACO
- Mid-Rivers Wireless
- Mobi
- Matanuska Telephone Association
- Nex-Tech Wireless
- Northwest Missouri Wireless
- Open Mobile
- nTelos
- Pioneer Cellular
- PTCI Wireless
- Revol Wireless
- Sagebrush
- Silver Star Communications
- South Central Communications
- SRT Communications
- Strata Networks
- Syringa Wireless
- Thumb Cellular
- United Wireless

== See also ==
- List of United States wireless communications service providers
