= Tello Mobile =

American mobile virtual network operator

- Company type: Privately held company
- Industry: Mobile telephony
- Founded: 2016; 10 years ago
- Founder: Florin Miron
- Headquarters: Atlanta, Georgia
- Key people: Florin Miron, CEO
- Owner: KeepCalling
- Website: tello.com

Tello Mobile is a mobile virtual network operator that uses the T-Mobile US mobile network. It provides prepaid cell phone services and customers are able to cancel their plans within a month. The company was founded in 2016, is headquartered in Atlanta, Georgia, and is owned by KeepCalling, with offices in the US, Romania, and Bolivia.

== Reviews ==
Tello was rated by Business Insider, U.S. News & World Report, Tom's Hardware, CBS News, and Money as having one of the "best cheap cell phone plans".

Tello received a 4-out-of-5 star rating from Android Central. It has a 4.5-out-of-5 star rating at Trustpilot.

== See also ==
- List of United States mobile virtual network operators
