= Sage Telecom =

American competitive local exchange carrier

Sage Telecom Inc.
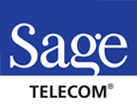
- Type: Privately held corporation
- Industry: Telecommunications Services
- Founded: Founded by Investors in 1996
- Headquarters: Dallas, Texas
- Key people: Matthew H. Johnson - Co-CEO and CFO; Nathan R. Johnson - Co-CEO; Joseph P. Holop - COO; Shahin Sazej - CTO
- Products: Local Phone Service, Home Phone Service, Business Phone Service, Dial Up Internet access

Sage Telecom, Inc was founded in 1996 as a competitive local exchange carrier (CLEC) reselling telecommunications primarily in rural markets served by SBC Communications. The company provided local phone service, local bundled phone service and dial up internet access in Arkansas, California, Connecticut, Illinois, Indiana, Kansas, Michigan, Missouri, Ohio, Oklahoma, Texas and Wisconsin. In February 2006 the company announced eSageLink, a high-speed dial up Internet service available first in and around Muncie, Indiana. In January 2007, Sage announced it had been acquired by hedge fund Silver Point Capital. In July, 2012, Sage was acquired by Telscape Communications.

== History ==
Sage Telecom was founded in Allen, Texas by Dennis M. Houlihan around 1996. In 1998 Sage received certification from the Public Utilities Commission (PUC) of Texas to provide local telephone service throughout the entire state of Texas. In 2001 Sage received certification from the Oklahoma Corporation Commission (OCC) to provide local telephone service throughout the state of Oklahoma. Dennis Houlihan was 2001 entrepreneur of the year in the emerging companies category as part of the Ernst & Young entrepreneur of the year program for the southwest region. In 2002 Sage began providing service in Kansas. In September 2003 Sage Telecom had the highest revenue growth in Texas for the previous five years, according to Deloitte and Touche. In April 2004 Sage Telecom and SBC reached the first wholesale commercial agreement between a CLEC and a Regional Bell Operating Company following the US Federal Court mandate that overturned government imposed wholesale rules issued by the Federal Communications Commission on the Telecommunications Act of 1996. Terry W. Lewis took over as president and CEO in 2005 from founder Houlihan. In April 2006, Sage announced a similar arrangement with Verizon.

In January 2007 Silver Point Capital acquired Sage, which had over 500 employees at the time. The company was led by president and CFO Chris Williams in 2007 during the transition. In July 2012 Telscape Communications, rebranded as TruConnect, acquired Sage from Silver Point for undisclosed terms.

== See also ==
- List of United States telephone companies
