= TAG Mobile =

Wireless telecommunications provider

- Industry: Wireless Telecommunications
- Founded: 2010
- Headquarters: Houston, Texas, United States
- Area served: United States
- Website: www.tagmobile.com

TAG Mobile is an American wireless telecommunications provider based in Houston, Texas. It is an Eligible Telecommunications Carrier (ETC) that provides free wireless services to eligible Lifeline consumers across 19 states. The TAG Mobile Lifeline Program provides cell phones to those in the low-income category and also individuals on government assistance programs in the US.

TAG Mobile also offers affordable prepaid wireless services including free international calling to over 80 countries, talk, text and data services and mobile devices.

== Eligibility requirements ==
The Lifeline Program for Low-Income Consumers is a government assistance program funded through the Universal Service Fund. Eligible subscribers who meet the requirements such as receiving government assistance or a household income that is below 135-175% of the federal poverty level (dependent upon the state) can apply for this service.

Eligibility requirements vary from state to state but the most commonly included eligibility criteria are:

- Supplemental Nutrition Assistance Program (SNAP),
- Medicaid (not Medicare),
- Supplemental Security Income (SSI), or
- Low-Income Home Energy Assistance Program (LIHEAP).

== Provided service ==
The TAG Mobile Lifeline Program provides – A free mobile phone, free monthly talk, text and 5G high speed Internet. Customers also receive free international calling to over 80+ countries.

Consumers have the option of BYOD (Bring Your Own Device) using either their previously owned or purchased phone (if compatible with the TAG Mobile Network) or getting an upgraded smartphone from TAG Mobile for use with their Lifeline supported service.

TAG Mobile operates on the AT&T Network.
