= Academic Competitiveness Grant =

United States federal assistance grant for college students with the greatest need

The Academic Competitiveness Grant, more commonly known by its acronym ACG, was a federal assistance grant reserved for college students with the greatest need for financial aid to attend school. To be eligible for this grant, students must have met all of the following criteria:

1. They must be a United States citizen or eligible non-citizen;
2. They must be Federal Pell Grant eligible;
3. They must be enrolled at least half-time in a degree program;
4. They must be in their first or second year of study at a two-year or four-year degree-granting institution;
5. First-year students must not have been previously enrolled in an undergraduate program;
6. Second-year students must have at least a cumulative 3.0 GPA on a 4.0 scale for their first year.

The ACG provided up to $750 for the first year and $1300 for the second year of study.

The ACG is no longer available as of the 2011-2012 financial aid award year due to government cuts.
