= TravelSim =

Company based in Estonia

TravelSim is a brand-name of Top Connect OÜ, an Estonian telecommunications company headquartered in Tallinn.

TravelSim is a prepaid SIM card that provides telecommunications to clients in 190 countries.

TravelSim has 3.5 million subscribers all over the world as of August 2013. TravelSim has a callback service for voice communications, data, messaging and voicemail.

Callback service means that when users dial an international number using a TravelSim prepaid SIM card, the company picks up the call, routes it to the number dialed and calls back, connecting the two ends of the line.

In 2014 Top Connect announced that the TravelSim service had saved its user base a collective $200 million in roaming charges in 2013.
