= Yahoo Mobile =

MVNO Cellular company

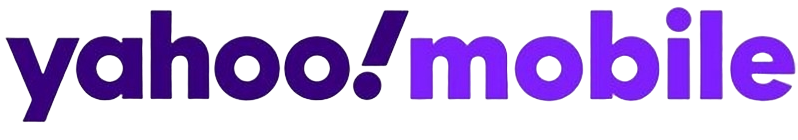
- Type: Subsidiary
- Industry: Wireless telecommunications
- Founded: March 11, 2020; 6 years ago
- Defunct: August 31, 2021
- Fate: Dissolved
- Successor: Visible Service LLC
- Headquarters: Denver, Colorado, United States
- Number of locations: (2020)
- Area served: United States
- Products: Wireless; Mobile phone
- Services: Mobile communications
- Parent: Verizon Media
- Website: yahoomobile.com (archived on March 2, 2021)

Yahoo Mobile (stylized as yahoo!mobile) was an all-digital wireless carrier in the United States, owned and operated wholly by Verizon Media. It offered unlimited text, talk, data, and hotspot on Verizon's 4G LTE and 5G networks.

Yahoo Mobile competed primarily against T-Mobile's Metro by T-Mobile and AT&T's Cricket Wireless as prepaid wireless service provider brands. It was founded in March 2020 and shut down in August 2021.

== History ==
Yahoo Mobile was launched by Verizon Media on March 11, 2020 following a press announcement. At launch, the service was the same as Verizon's existing prepaid brand Visible, albeit with a higher price of $39.99 per month for unlimited calls, data and mobile hotspot usage. Yahoo Mobile was dissolved in August 2021 after Verizon sold Verizon Media to Apollo Global Management.

== Customer complaints ==
The company faced numerous complaints since its inception for lackluster or non-existent customer support, which was only available via chat through their Android or iOS app, and social media platforms Facebook and Twitter. The company had no phone number, and thus no customer support via telephone.

== Network ==
=== Coverage ===
Yahoo Mobile provided wireless services in the contiguous United States and Hawaii via parent, Verizon's nationwide CDMA, EVDO, LTE, and 5G networks.

=== Phone support ===
From launch, Yahoo Mobile supported unlocked iPhone and Android devices.

== Services ==
- Yahoo Mail Pro
- Account Pro
- Visible Protect

== Marketing ==
Yahoo Mobile's target audience was primarily young adults looking for a cheap and affordable phone service.

On October 29, 2020, Yahoo Mobile launched a carrier branded smartphone. The ZTE Blade A3Y was a rebrand of the original ZTE Blade A3 by sister company Visible. It included pre-installed Yahoo branded apps such as Mail, News, Sports, Finance, Weather, and Mobile. Customers could get the phone for free if they swapped in their existing phone.

== Retail presence ==
Yahoo Mobile products and services were sold via the yahoomobile.com web site.
