= PureTalk =

American mobile virtual network operator

PureTalk Holdings, Inc.
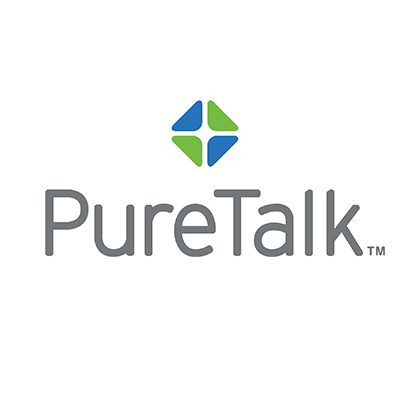
- Type: Subsidiary
- Industry: Telecommunications
- Founded: 2010
- Headquarters: Covington, Georgia, United States
- Services: Wireless service provider
- Number of employees: 500+ (2022)
- Parent: Telrite Holdings, Inc.
- Website: puretalk.com

PureTalk Holdings, Inc. is an American mobile virtual network operator headquartered in Covington, Georgia, United States. PureTalk provides wireless phone service over the AT&T network.

== Marketing ==
PureTalk is promoted primarily towards senior citizens, as well as U.S. military veterans (the latter citing the company's promotion as being "veteran-run").

PureTalk has marketed itself through paid endorsements by conservative radio hosts and internet personalities such as Sean Hannity, Mark Levin, Candace Owens, Dennis Prager, Tucker Carlson, Ben Shapiro, Clay Travis, Brett Cooper, Mike Rowe, and Buck Sexton. Levin has promoted Pure Talk as an alternative to AT&T, thinking the latter a "woke" company, even while PureTalk uses the AT&T network to provide service and also sells devices from companies such as Apple often targeted by conservatives as the same.
