= Element Mobile =

- Type: Private
- Industry: Telecommunications
- Founded: 2009
- Headquarters: Central Wisconsin
- Products: Wireless
- Parent: Wisconsin RSA #7 Ltd
- Website: www.ElementMobile.com

Element Mobile was a CDMA-Based cellular service provider headquartered in Wisconsin Rapids, Wisconsin, that launched in January 2011. The company, officially known as Wisconsin RSA #7 Limited Partnership, displaced Alltel in Central Wisconsin.

== History ==
Element Mobile was founded on January 7, 2011, when former customers of Alltel Wireless were moved to Element's network. Customers experienced long waits for customer service and connectivity issues during its initial months of operation. Some customers were without service for several days due to network updates, and angry customers created a Facebook group. 610 complaints were filed with the Wisconsin Better Business Bureau, mostly in February 2011. The complaints dropped off as technical problems from the switchover from Alltel were worked out. The company built three new cellular towers in 2011 and four in 2012. In late 2013, Element Mobile announced that it would be acquired by AT&T Mobility and be known as Lake Mobility once FCC approval and expansion and updating of its network was complete.

== Network ==
Element Mobile uses the CDMA standard.
