= NEP Telephone =

American telecommunications company

North-Eastern Pennsylvania Telephone Company
- Company type: Private
- Industry: Telecommunications
- Founded: 1900
- Founder: Fred J. Osgood
- Headquarters: Forest City, Pennsylvania, United States
- Products: Landline Telephone Service, DSL, IPTV
- Website: nep.net

North-Eastern Pennsylvania Telephone Company (NEP) is a telecommunications provider headquartered in Forest City, Pennsylvania. The company operates as a local exchange carrier in rural areas of Lackawanna County, Wayne County and Susquehanna County. Besides landline telephone, NEP offers Broadband Internet, NEP Datavision IPTV and Wireless Phone Services.

== History ==
NEP was founded in March 1900 by Fred J. Osgood to provide a telephone service to the town of Forest City, Pennsylvania. In its first year of operation, it purachsed Penn Mutual Telephone Company. In 1941, NEP merged with Anthracite Telephone Company.

NEP launched a GSM wireless service in 2007. NEP Telephone previously had GSM wireless services in place for Dimock, Montrose, Susquehanna, Forest City, and other towns in the area. They offered EDGE and GPRS wireless data services. They also allow customers from other GSM carriers to roam onto their network when service from their home carrier was not available. NEP offered nationwide coverage via roaming agreements with AT&T and T-Mobile USA.

In April, 2011 NEP finished upgrading its data infrastructure to support the ADSL2+ standard. The upgrade includes access to faster Internet download speeds and a new IPTV platform. In 2012, NEP joined the Rural Telecommunications Group trade association.

In 2013, NEP started to draw from its initial disbursement of $2 million it received from the FCC mobility fund of 2012. It had received $6.7 million overall from the fund. NEP was using these funds to construct a 4G LTE network in the 700 MHz B block. NEP owns a 700 MHz B block license for CMA-122 Binghamton, NY. Effective September 22, 2015, NEP Wireless chose to exit the retail wireless business and the service was subsequently terminated. NEP Wireless was purchased by AT&T Mobility.
