= Big River Telephone =

Big River Telephone Company, LLC is a telecommunications company located in the Midwestern United States. Big River Telephone is classified as a competitive local exchange carrier (CLEC) and is a wholesale digital provider of voice over Internet Protocol (VoIP) services to the cable industry.

== History ==
Big River Telephone began in 1984 as LDD, Inc. LDD was primarily a long distance telephone service provider until The Telecommunications Act of 1996 opened the communication market. After this, LDD started competing for local telephone service.

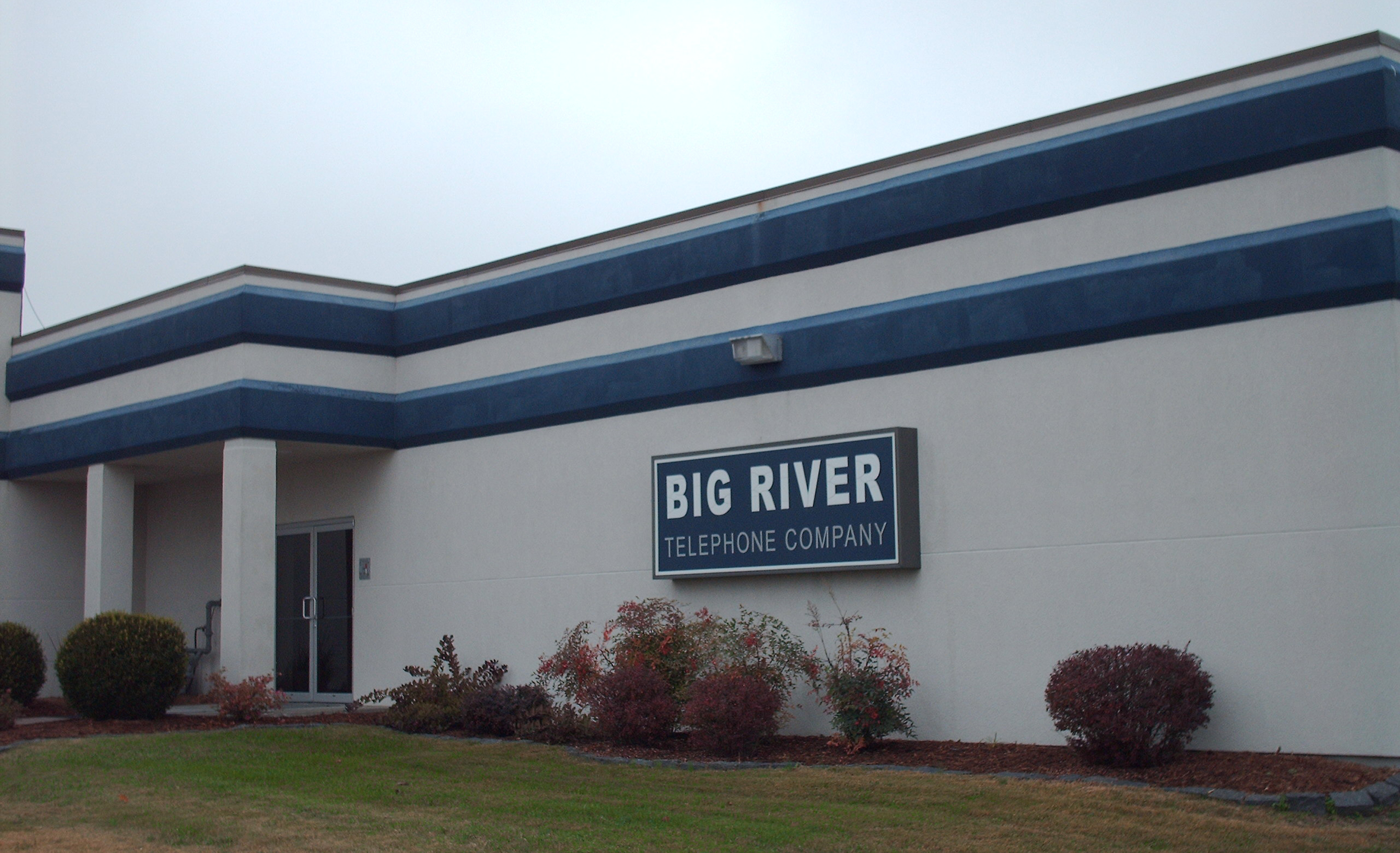
Big River Telephone Corporate Headquarters

In 2001, independent investors acquired the assets of LDD, Inc. The former LDD image was phased out and the company took a new look and approach to the telecommunication industry as Big River Telephone Company, LLC. Over the next several years, Big River Telephone acquired several small local Internet service providers, including one of the leading ISPs in the area, Clas.net. Big River also acquired Cascade.net in 2005 and Atprs.net in 2008.

Big River Telephone's service platform took a technological leap after their Voice over Internet Protocol local switching network was established in 2004. This new approach allowed Big River Telephone to deliver regular telephone service with enhanced features as well as high speed Internet and other advanced data services to small businesses and residential customers. The completion of the VoIP local switching network assisted in the implementation of a new product called Integrated Communications Exchange (ICE). The ICE technology combines high-speed data with voice signals over the same connection minimizing the number of wired connections.

Big River Telephone is providing VoIP services to cable providers across the United States.

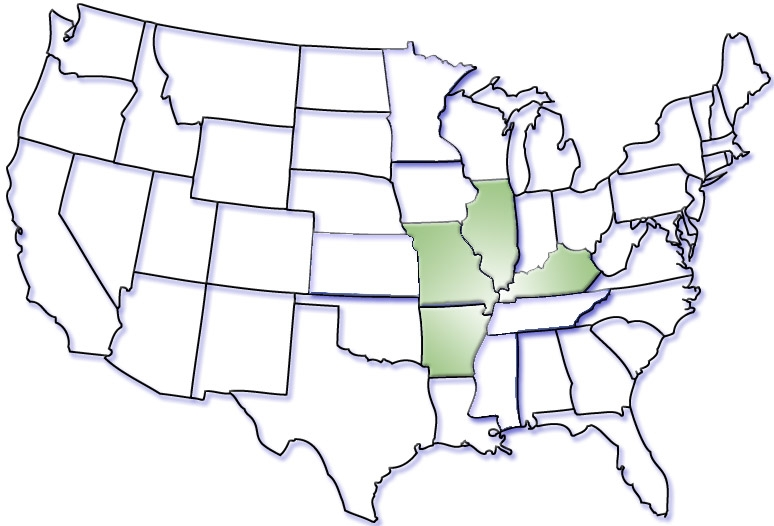
Traditional Telecommunications Sales coverage area

== Customer service ==
One of the backbones of Big River Telephone's has customer relationship management (CRM) software from The Sage Group.

== Awards and recognition ==
The Gartner Group presented Big River Telephone with the Customer Relationship Management (CRM) Excellence Award for Big River's implementation of successful customer experience and corporate philosophy. CIO Decisions named Big River Telephone one of the top 10 companies in the United States for customer focus. Big River Telephone has also received recognition from 1 to 1 Magazine as one of the top 13 Customer Champion organizations.

== Big River digital telephone services ==
Big River Telephone has partnered with cable companies.

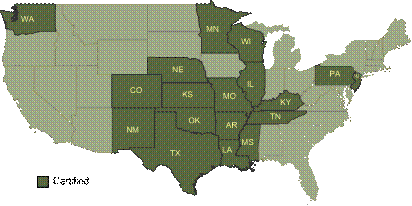
Digital Telephone coverage map. Dark Green areas represent active markets and light green areas represent emerging markets.

This technology allows cable companies to offer their subscribers the “triple play” bundle of video, data and voice service. Big River Telephone provides cable operators the ability to add full-featured residential and business telephony services to their existing customer base quickly and efficiently. Big River Telephone provides back-office platform support, network connectivity for voice traffic, support for operations and marketing and technical support. Currently Big River Telephone is providing back-office support and service to cable operations in Missouri, Illinois, Kentucky, Tennessee, Mississippi, Minnesota, Arkansas, Pennsylvania, Kansas, Texas, New Jersey, New Mexico, Oklahoma, Louisiana, Colorado, Nebraska, Indiana, and Georgia.

== Telecommunications networking ==
Big River Telephone Company operates a network of class 4 and class 5 switches. To ensure reliability and security, Big River has implemented Class 5 VoIP switching technologies by MetaSwitch. With the deployment of MetaSwitch equipment on their network, Big River is able to deliver the advantages of VoIP technology directly to the end user. The implementation of the MetaSwitch allows Big River the opportunity to streamline its existing operations and to expand its innovative services including VoIP from a single platform. This technology is the core of delivering dial tone, connecting calls, providing call features, and routing calls for Big River Telephone Company. The Big River telephone and MetaSwitch relationship is an active public partnership program that is engineering focused to ensure that both companies can co-operatively work together on any interoperability matters.

== Web interface technologies ==
Big River Telephone has internally developed web applications available to the public via Big River's teleconferencing and voicemail products.

Big River's on-demand, web enabled teleconferencing interface allows customer control of all features traditionally unavailable to the public. Big River's web-enabled voicemail allows customer control and management via a secure website.

By using Voice over Internet Protocol technology, Big River's Teleconferencing and Voicemail systems are fully digital and compatible with all modern telephone systems.

Big River Telephone is currently utilizing new media to disseminate information internally and externally. Big River Telephone has made itself accessible worldwide through Facebook, YouTube and Twitter.

== Operations Support Systems ==
Big River Telephone's operations support systems (OSS) handles a full range of telecommunication services including number portability, E911, directory assistance, operator services, voice mail, and a complete billing solution that includes call detail reporting and taxing.

== Other projects ==
Big River Telephone is actively working to provide Advanced Wireless Services, also known as AWS-1, a wireless telecommunications spectrum band used for mobile voice, data services, video, and messaging. AWS-1 is used in the United States and replaces the spectrum formerly allocated to Multipoint Multichannel Distribution Service, sometimes referred to as wireless cable. The FCC has divided the spectrum into hundreds of rural licenses—rather than a handful of licenses that span large geographic areas—making it easier for smaller providers in remote cities and towns to bid. Big River Telephone Company acquired a band on the federal license Advanced Wireless Spectrum in 2007 with the intention of serving the counties where the majority of their customers are. Those counties are Bollinger, Cape Girardeau, Madison, Perry, St. Francois, Ste. Genevieve, Washington and Wayne.

On August 4, 2010, Big River Telephone was announced as the recipient of $24.4 million in American Reinvestment and Recovery Act funding to extend high-speed Internet service to seven Missouri counties in southeast Missouri. The counties to be served are Bollinger, Cape Girardeau, Madison, Perry, St. Francois, Ste. Genevieve and Washington counties. The network deployment, which will provide access to 44,697 households and 7,511 businesses, was applauded by Governor Jay Nixon, who on August 5, visited the company to hold a press conference announcing the funding. Big River expects to add 75 people when work on the broadband build out is complete.
