= NTT Docomo USA =

NTT Docomo USA, Inc.
- Type: Public
- Industry: Wireless services
- Headquarters: 757 3rd Avenue, 16th Floor, New York, New York 10017
- Parent: NTT DoCoMo
- Website: www.docomo-usa.com

NTT Docomo USA is a subsidiary of NTT Docomo which operates in the United States.

== Background ==
NTT Docomo USA is the fully owned U.S. subsidiary of NTT Docomo, Inc. in Japan. Established on November 1, 1999, its headquarters were originally located in San Jose, California. As of July 9, 2001, the USA headquarters were officially moved to New York City. With offices in New York, Washington DC, and a research lab facility in San Jose, California.

== Docomo USA Wireless ==
NTT Docomo USA began its Docomo USA Wireless service as a Mobile Virtual Network Operator (MVNO) on April 6, 2011. Their partnership with T-Mobile was updated in September 2013. The company's mobile phone service targets the Japanese market in the U.S.

=== Mobile devices ===
- Nokia 2720
- Nokia 2730
- Motorola WX345
- BlackBerry Curve 3G 9300
- BlackBerry Curve 8520
- Google Nexus S
- Galaxy Nexus
- Nokia 500

NTT Docomo USA is noted for implementing the first open source Secure Neighbor Discovery (SEND), a cryptographic solution that counteract threats to the Neighbor Discovery Protocol.

== See also ==
- List of public corporations by market capitalization
- List of largest companies by revenue
- List of telecommunications companies
- List of United States telephone companies
