= Visible by Verizon =

American wireless carrier

Visible Service LLC
- Trade name: Visible by Verizon
- Type: Subsidiary
- Industry: Wireless telecommunications
- Founded: May 10, 2018; 8 years ago
- Headquarters: Denver, Colorado, United States
- Number of locations: (2018)
- Area served: United States
- Key people: Jeremy Bolton (managing director)
- Products: Wireless; Mobile phone
- Services: Mobile communications
- Owner: Verizon
- Parent: Verizon Value
- Website: visible.com

Visible Service LLC, doing business as Visible by Verizon, (stylized as v˙s˙ble), is an American all-digital prepaid mobile virtual network operator (MVNO) and brand wholly-owned by Verizon. Launched in 2018, the carrier offers services on the Verizon network, with all services delivered via e-commerce and mobile apps using generative AI, and no brick and mortar retail presence.

Visible was recognized by J.D. Power in August 2024 for delivering the best purchase experience among value mobile virtual network operators.

== History ==
Visible was launched by Verizon on May 10, 2018 without any prior announcement, promoting an unlimited plan for $40 per-month. At launch, the service was only available by invitation, and at the time, required users to register via the Visible app or its website. Once registered, Visible would send users a SIM card the next day and once installed, can access the network. In addition, only unlocked phones were available to be used at launch.

In 2020, Verizon launched Yahoo! Mobile, an MVNO co-branded with the then-Verizon owned Yahoo! web portal; the service was identical to that of Visible, but with the addition of Yahoo! Mail Pro. The service was discontinued on August 31, 2021, with customers being directed to Visible.

In May 2021, long-time Verizon executive Angie Klein became CEO of Visible. In November 2022, following its acquisition of TracFone Wireless, Verizon's prepaid and value brands were brought under a new Verizon Value division led by Klein. In June 2022, Visible was rebranded as Visible by Verizon.

== Services ==
Visible is positioned as an all-digital MVNO on the Verizon network, with most business conducted online and via the Visible mobile app. On September 22, 2025, Visible became available through Best Buy retail locations. The expansion provides customers with the option to access Visible's app-based wireless service while also offering the convenience of in-store availability.

Customers can pay upfront per-month or for a year of service. Visible offers "basic" and "premium" unlimited plans, with the "premium" plan differentiated by 50 GB of "prioritized" data access on the Verizon 5G ultra-wideband network, expanded roaming (including 2 GB per-day of data in Canada and Mexico), an extra line for a smartwatch, and the ability to purchase a per-day "Global Pass" for unlimited roaming and 2 GB of data in 140 countries. The service also allows customers to refer friends to receive a $20 credit. Until August 2022, Visible allowed customers to add additional lines of basic service for $25 per-month ("Party Pay"); the cost of a basic plan was later lowered to $25 per-month in 2023.

== Marketing ==
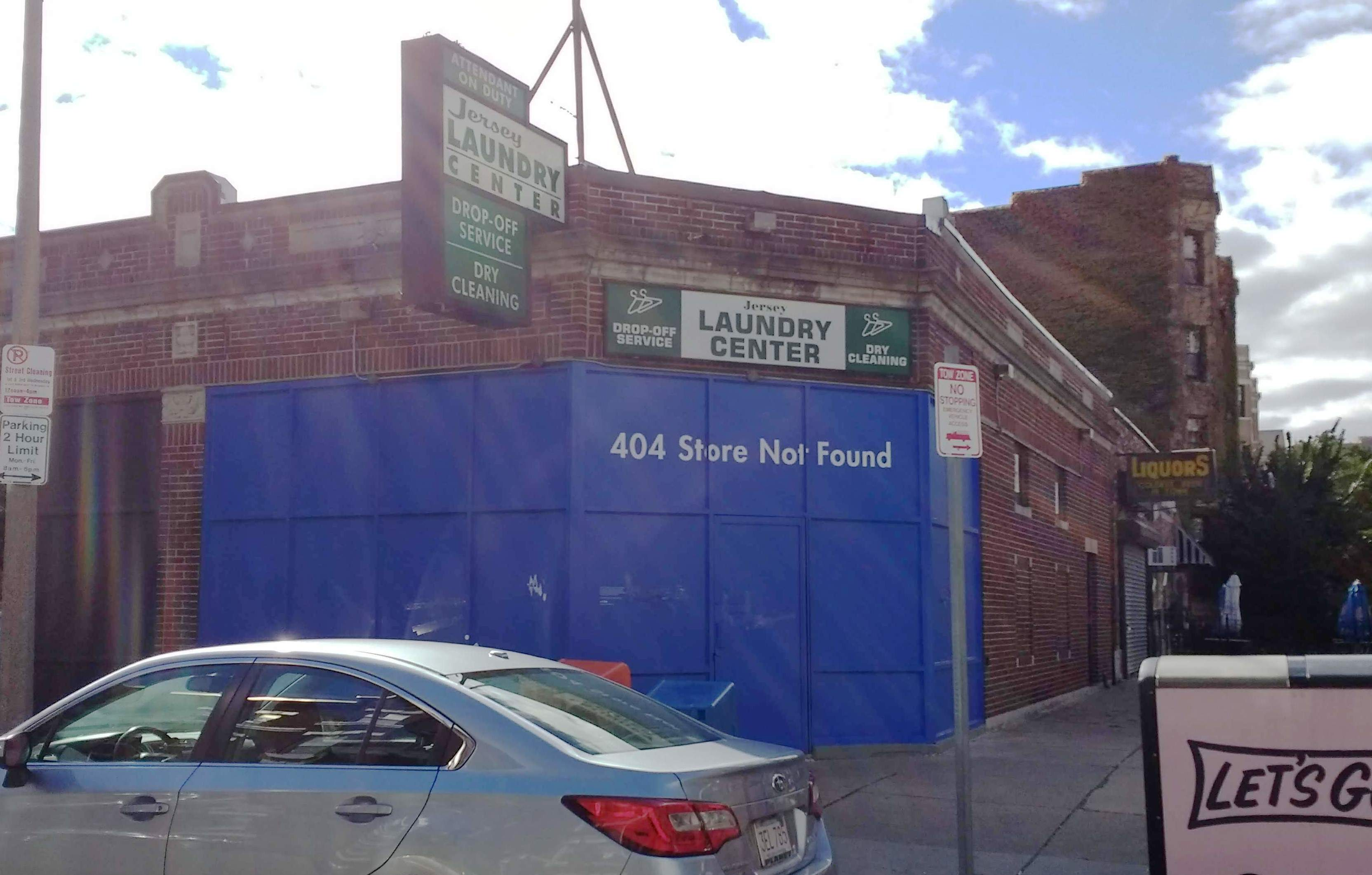
A Boston storefront decorated with a Visible advertisement.

Early promotion for Visible included storefronts in several cities decorated with solid blue "404 Store Not Found" signage, alluding to the carrier's lack of brick and mortar presence. In 2019, Visible ran a stunt offering free massages at Denver Union Station, after having run a mobile billboard that contained the typo "unlimited massages". In 2020, amid the COVID-19 pandemic, Visible ran the campaign "#ViVisibleActsofKindnes" to help raise money for pandemic response efforts, and launched a wider television and digital media campaign to promote its services.

== Customer complaints ==
The company has faced numerous complaints since its inception related to its lackluster or non-existent customer support, which is only available via chat through their Android or iOS app, and social media platforms Facebook and Twitter. The company has no phone number, and thus no customer support via telephone. Customer complaints range from weeks long waits for porting in/out to complete, SIM/eSIM provisioning issues, loss of service for multiple days, failing to honor promotional deals, and charges to credit cards without services provided.

On April 28, 2021, the Better Business Bureau issued an alert posted for the company, citing a pattern of consumer complaints that the company was unresponsive to their request for assistance regarding cellular service and billing and advising consumers to file complaints with the Federal Trade Commission Bureau of Consumer Protection.

In a September 20, 2022 article in Fierce Wireless, the company admitted problems with its customer service model.
