= US Mobile =

Telecommunications company in the United States

- Type: Private
- Industry: Telecommunications
- Founded: 2015; 11 years ago
- Founder: Ahmed Khattak
- Headquarters: New York City, New York, U.S.
- Key people: Ahmed Khattak (CEO)
- Products: Mobile phone service
- Website: usmobile.com

US Mobile is an American mobile virtual network operator (MVNO) that uses the T-Mobile, Verizon Wireless, and AT&T networks (branded as "Light Speed", "Warp", and "Dark Star" respectively) to provide cellular services to their customers.

Services offered by US Mobile do not involve long term contracts and are structured to allow periodic changes by the user. The carrier does not use network operator names in its marketing and offers Verizon coverage under the brand "Warp" (formerly "Super LTE"), T-Mobile service under the brand "Light Speed" (previously "GSM 5G" and "GSM LTE") and the AT&T network, branded as "Dark Star". Similar to other prepaid carriers, the provider also sells phones through its website and partners with third parties and various retailers for distribution.

== History ==
Based in New York City, US Mobile was founded in 2015 by CEO Ahmed Khattak as a GSM-based service provider.

In 2020, the company claimed to have around 250,000 customers.

In 2021, it was announced that the carrier would offer pooled plans where customers pay for data in bulk to use across multiple devices and users. The pooled plan service saw usage from 300 to 3,000 lines in one month, according to the company's CEO. That same year, the company raised $11.5 million in Series A funding from Volition Capital.

In 2022, it was reported that the company launched 5G C-Band access on its network, adding onto the existing 5G UW mmWave access from Verizon.

In late 2023, the company announced it would begin offering customers the option to activate service on AT&T’s network, referred to internally as "Dark Star." The option became available on July 15, 2024, with full support beginning two weeks later. With service available on the three major U.S. wireless telecoms, the company began referring to itself as a "Super Carrier".
