= Competitive Carriers Association =

American wireless industry trade association

- CCA
- Established: 1992; 34 years ago
- Location: Washington, D.C., United States
- Key people: Tim Donovan (President and CEO)
- Website: ccamobile.org

The Competitive Carriers Association (commonly the CCA) was founded in 1992 by nine small wireless carriers in the United States as a 501(c)(6) non-profit trade association to promote the common interests of competitive, regional, and rural wireless services providers. Its counterpart, particularly for non-regional wireless carriers, is the CTIA.

== History ==
The organization was founded in 1992 as the Rural Carriers Association (RCA), but became the Competitive Carriers Association in 2012 as national carriers Sprint and T-Mobile US joined. It has long advocated for policies and standards that promote greater competitive in the wireless industry, particularly with regard to issues around wireless spectrum.
