= Kroger Wireless =

American virtual network operator

Kroger Wireless LLC
- Type: Subsidiary
- Industry: Telecommunications
- Founded: 2005; 21 years ago
- Headquarters: Newport, Kentucky, United States
- Number of locations: In Kroger family of stores
- Key people: Gary Millerchip (Board Member)
- Services: Mobile virtual network operator
- Parent: Kroger
- Website: krogerwireless.com

Kroger Wireless LLC is an American mobile virtual network operator providing domestic telecommunications services via the T-Mobile Network. The brand was launched as i-wireless, a Kroger Co. It was trialed in 130 Kroger stores in 2006, before being rolled out by mid-2008 to over 2,200 locations, including banner stores such as Dillons, Ralphs, Fred Meyer, and Fry's Food and Drug. Unique among US wireless operators, i-wireless created a loyalty offer allowing customers the ability to earn Wireless Rewards on select plans when using their shopper's loyalty card on in-store qualifying purchases. In May 2019, the company announced the name of its prepaid product brand changing from "i-wireless, a Kroger Co." to "Kroger Wireless."

== Kroger Wireless ==
Kroger Wireless is the private-label wireless service sold exclusively within the Kroger Family of Companies stores. Kroger Wireless acts like other US prepaid carriers–requiring no contracts, activation fees, or credit checks to purchase their phones. The company offers “Unlimited” rate plans including unlimited talk/text and data allotments up to and including unlimited data.

Kroger Wireless invites customers to purchase phones at select Kroger store locations, via their website, or by bringing their eligible Sprint device for activation. In addition, it hosts the Kroger Wireless My Account app for Android or iOS mobile customers.

== Access Wireless ==
i-wireless dba Access Wireless is a service provider for the government-funded Lifeline Assistance program. The Lifeline Assistance program was designed to ensure that quality telecommunications services are available to low-income customers at reasonable and affordable rates. Customers who qualify for the program receive a free allotment of voice, text and data, and may receive a free mobile phone- dependent on individual state regulations.
