= Verizon Value =

Mobile virtual network operator

Verizon Value, Inc.
- Type: Subsidiary
- Industry: Telecommunications
- Predecessor: Topp Telecom, Inc., TracFone Wireless, Inc.
- Founded: 1996; 30 years ago, in Miami, Florida, United States
- Defunct: November 21, 2021 (as an independent company)
- Fate: Acquired by Verizon and split.
- Headquarters: Miami, Florida, United States
- Number of locations: 90,000 retail locations
- Area served: United States (including Alaska, Hawaii, Puerto Rico, and U.S. Virgin Islands)
- Brands: Safelink Wireless; Simple Mobile; Straight Talk Wireless; Total Wireless; Tracfone; Verizon Prepaid; Visible by Verizon; Walmart Family Mobile
- Services: Prepaid mobile virtual network operator
- Number of employees: 400+ (2008)
- Parent: Verizon (2021-present)

Verizon Value, Inc. formerly TracFone Wireless, Inc. (TFWI), is a United States prepaid wireless service provider. It is a mobile virtual network operator offering prepaid and no-contract services on the Verizon network under several brands, including SafeLink Wireless, Simple Mobile, Straight Talk Wireless, Total Wireless, Tracfone Wireless, and Walmart Family Mobile (in partnership with Walmart).

In 2021, Verizon acquired TracFone Wireless from América Móvil in a transaction valued at around $6.9 billion. TracFone Wireless, Inc. was rebranded to Verizon Value.

== History ==
TracFone logo from 2005-2014. Used as a corporate logo until 2025.

TracFone logo used for the Tracfone brand.

TracFone Wireless was established in 1996 as Topp Telecom Inc., a prepaid mobile phone company, in Miami, Florida. It was founded by David Topp and F.J. Pollak. Pollak acted as the CEO of Tracfone until his death in 2016. In February 1999, Topp received a major infusion of capital from Telmex, Mexico's largest telephone company. Telmex paid $57.5 million for a 55 percent controlling interest in the company.

In 2000, Telmex spun off its mobile unit, creating América Móvil, of which Topp Telecom became a subsidiary. In November 2000, Topp Telecom Inc. changed its name to TracFone Wireless Inc. In 2009, TracFone partnered with Walmart to launch its MVNO Straight Talk Wireless.

In 2012, América Móvil acquired rival network Simple Mobile. In May 2013, América Móvil purchased Page Plus Cellular, which had 1.4 million subscribers.

LTE service was inaugurated by TracFone's brands over a year and a half, with Sprint networks handsets first supporting it in May 2013, followed by AT&T four months later in September, then T-Mobile in March 2014. Verizon's TracFone handsets began to be supported in December 2014.

Originally, TracFone service was limited to TracFone-branded phones, which are locked to the TracFone service using an internal SIM card. Other GSM phones, even those that were unlocked from another carrier, could not accept a TracFone SIM card, because these are bound to a specific handset. In 2013, TracFone began to open up its device pool with a 'bring your own device' program, selling SIM cards that could be inserted into qualifying non-TracFone phones (such as Verizon CDMA phones) to connect with the TracFone network. In 2015, the program was expanded to unlocked and compatible GSM handsets.

On September 14, 2020, Verizon announced its intent to acquire TracFone Wireless in a cash-and-stock deal worth up to $6.9 billion. At the time of the purchase, TracFone's brands had around 20 million customers in total. The acquisition was approved by the Federal Communications Commission (FCC) on November 22, 2021, and closed the following day. As part of the purchase, Verizon agreed to provide "cost-effective" 5G services to Lifeline program participants, and continue its participation in the subsidy program for at least seven years. The California Public Utilities Commission (CPUC) mandated further requirements, including that all California customers of TracFone services must be migrated to the Verizon network, Verizon must participate in Lifeline for 20 years and expand its customer base in the program, offer 5G devices at no cost to these customers, and maintain comparable prices for five years.

In November 2022, Verizon reorganized its portfolio of prepaid and low-cost brands into the new Verizon Value division led by Angie Klein, encompassing TracFone and its existing Verizon Prepaid and Visible businesses. Verizon announced that it would discontinue the GoSmart, Net10, and Page Plus brands in November 2024 (November 2026 in California). Customers of TracFone brands are being migrated to Verizon SIM cards and devices.

Verizon rebranded Total Wireless as "Total by Verizon" on September 21, 2022, with the company positioning it as a competitor to AT&T's Cricket Wireless and T-Mobile's Metro. Verizon also began to open dedicated retail outlets. On July 11, 2024, the Total Wireless name was reinstated as part of a rebranding, and started to only offer unlimited plans.

== Legal issues ==
=== Roaming and repair issues ===
On February 9, 2007, a preliminary settlement in a class-action lawsuit against TracFone was carried out by Jeanette Wagner, and approved in the Boone County Circuit Court in Kentucky. The complainants alleged that TracFone misled consumers by charging a roaming rate in their home calling area (they were charged for 2 units per minute, not the usual 1 unit per minute), and that it refused to extend their prepaid service time during handset repairs. As a result of the settlement, Tracfone gave each of their customers an extra 20 units of airtime.

=== Misleading "unlimited" plan claims ===
In January 2015, the Federal Trade Commission started a class action lawsuit naming TracFone and its affiliates, saying that the company cut off or slowed down "unlimited" data to its customers after they reached a fixed 30-day limit. This led to $40 million in consumer refunds as a result.
