= Cellular One =

United States telecommunications brand name

Cellular One logo

Cellular One is the trademarked brand name that licenses services (radio frequencies for telecommunications) used by several cellular service providers in the United States. The brand was sold to Trilogy Partners by AT&T in 2008 shortly after AT&T had completed its acquisition of Dobson Communications. Cellular One was originally the trade name of one of the first mobile telephone service providers.

== History ==
In 1977, the American Radio Telephone Service and Motorola formed Cellular One to offer services to the Baltimore/Washington, D.C., area. Cellular service began in the Baltimore/DC area in December 1983.

In July 1986, it was announced that Metromedia Inc. would sell its 55 percent stake in Cellular One to Southwestern Bell. Southwestern Bell later joined into a partnership with McCaw Communications and Vanguard Cellular Systems called Cellular One Group, which the companies stated would help create a unified cellular network. Cellular One Group was eventually opened to include all A-side providers. Under the US AMPS allocation, A-side providers were independent wireless operators, while B-side providers were usually affiliates of the local landline telephone company. By 1995, Cellular One affiliates had over 5 million customers and affiliates' towers that served approximately 69% of the US population. AT&T purchased McCaw Cellular in 1994; shortly thereafter, AT&T renamed the former McCaw providers "AT&T Wireless" and dropped out of the partnership. Western Wireless joined the partnership in 1999, and in 2001, the Cellular One group name became the sole property of Western Wireless.

=== Western Wireless ===
Western Wireless operated under the Cellular One brand prior to being purchased by Alltel in August 2005.

=== Dobson ===
The Cellular One brand name was also used by Dobson Cellular in various rural markets in the continental US and in Alaska. In December 2005, Dobson purchased the rights to the Cellular One name from Alltel. However, their services were completely unrelated. Dobson used a TDMA and GSM network; Western Wireless used a GSM, AMPS, TDMA and CDMA network. As of November 15, 2007, Dobson was acquired by AT&T Inc., except several areas still operated under the Cellular One brand name. The Cellular One brand was sold to Trilogy Partners as a result of the terms of the acquisition agreement.

== Regional markets that operate under the Cellular One brand name ==
| Market | Name | Web site | Holding company | Owners | Notes |
|---|---|---|---|---|---|
| Northeastern Arizona, Northwestern New Mexico, Southern Colorado, and Southern Utah | Cellular One of North East Arizona | mycellularone.com | Smith Bagley Inc. | Elizabeth Frawley Bagley and children | Partner with Tier 1 carriers to offer Nationwide coverage |

== Former Cellular One partners ==
=== Partners that went out of business without acquisition of itself or its assets ===
- Central Louisiana Wireless, LLC dba Cellular One

=== Independent wireless providers ===
- Viaero Wireless (Formerly Cellular One of Northeast Colorado)
- Arctic Slope Telephone Association Cooperative

=== Partners acquired by Atlantic Tele-Network ===
- Choice Wireless, LLC - Texas and Oklahoma
- One Communications (Formerly Cell One of Bermuda)

=== Partners acquired by T-Mobile ===
- UScellular (Formerly Madison Cellular Telephone Co. and Westel Milwaukee Company, Inc. of BellSouth Mobility) - Wisconsin and northern Illinois, acquired in 2025.

=== Partners acquired by Verizon Wireless ===
- Unicel (Rural Cellular Corporation - AL, KS, MA, MN, MS, OR, ME, NH) Completed August 2008
- Price Communications Wireless (Bay County FL, Southern GA including Macon and Albany, Southern AL including Dothan and Montgomery, and southern SC) purchase completed in August 2002
- Alabama Wireless, Inc. (Cellular One of Northern Alabama) Purchased January 2002
- Contel Cellular/GTE Mobilnet (operated under the Cellular One name in most of Tennessee, north-west Georgia, northern Alabama, and north central Kentucky; dropped the Cellular One name and switched to the GTE Wireless name in the late 1990s)
- Cell One Kansas City: Owned and operated by Airtouch, morphed into Verizon at launch in 2000
- Cellular One of Northeast Pennsylvania Wayne and Pike counties, Pennsylvania (South Canaan Cellular, owned by US Cellular until Verizon Wireless acquisition)

Verizon properties Originally acquired by Alltel prior to the January 2009 merger

- Cellular XL (Cellular One of Mississippi) Purchased December 2002
- HickoryTech Wireless (Cellular One of Mankato) Purchased by Western Wireless Jan. 2004
- Western Wireless (Cellular One West - AZ, AR, CA, CO, IA, ID, KS, MN, MO, MT, ND, NE, NM, NV, OK, SD, TX, UT & WY) Purchased Jan. 2005
- Virginia Cellular (CellOne Virginia) Purchased 2005
- Cellular One of Amarillo Purchased April 2006
- Cellular One of Baton Rouge, Louisiana (owned by the former James Garvey's Radiofone of Metairie, Louisiana, which SBC bought; divested by SBC to Alltel when SBC and BellSouth formed Cingular because BellSouth already had a cellular system in Baton Rouge)

=== Partners acquired by AT&T ===
- Unicel only in the states of VT, NY and WA. Other Unicel systems were acquired by Verizon.
- AT&T Wireless (original McCaw systems; see above)
- Cingular Wireless (see above)
- Vanguard Cellular (see above)
- BellSouth Cellular (operated under the Cellular One name instead of the BellSouth name in the Indianapolis, IN and Chicago areas with Chicago later sold to SBC Communications; both switched to the Cingular brand when SBC and BellSouth formed Cingular)
- Centennial Communications (operated under the Cellular One name in northern Indiana, Louisiana, southwest Michigan, and Mississippi; later dropped the Cellular One name and rebranded as Centennial Wireless; company acquired by AT&T in 2009 with most Mississippi and Louisiana assets divested to Verizon Wireless)
- Santa Cruz Cellular Telephone Company, Santa Cruz County, CA (purchased by Dobson in the mid-1990s sold to AT&T in approximately 2002)-This was a key purchase for AT&T as only missing holes in O&O Northern California coverage were San Benito & Santa Cruz counties, owned then, by Dobson.
- Easterbrooke Cellular, Elkins, WV- Purchased on January 3, 2008, to expand coverage in West Virginia
- Dobson Communications acquisitions
  - PriCellular (New York, Pennsylvania, Minnesota, Ohio, Kentucky, Michigan, West Virginia, Tennessee) — Acquired by American Cellular in March 1998
  - American Cellular — Purchased August 2003
  - RFB Cellular, Inc (Cellular One of Northeast Michigan) — Purchased by Dobson Communications in December 2004
  - Highland Cellular (VA, WV) — Purchased in October 2006 by American Cellular (a subsidiary of Dobson Communications)
- Cellular Communications of Puerto Rico, Inc (Cellular One Puerto Rico, also serves U.S. Virgin Islands) — Acquired by SBC Communications and Telmex for $814 million in 1999, switched to the Cingular brand when SBC and BellSouth formed Cingular.
- Cellular One of Lake Charles, Louisiana (first acquired by Centennial Wireless which was purchased by AT&T in Nov. 2008)
- San Luis Obispo County, California (SLO Cellular) — Sold to AT&T, service ends January 17, 2011.
- Long Lines Wireless (Formerly Cellular One of Great Lakes of Iowa) - Acquired by AT&T July 2013
- Edge Wireless (AT&T Affiliate merged into AT&T in April 2008). Edge Wireless served Northern California, Southern Oregon, Southeastern and Southcentral Idaho and Jackson, Wyoming.
- Cellular One of East Central Illinois (Cellular Properties Inc.), purchased in 2016.
- Indigo Wireless (Formerly Cellular One of West Nebraska, and Cellular One of north central Pennsylvania) Went out of business in 2023, sold its spectrum licenses to AT&T
