= Houston Cellular =

Houston Cellular Telephone Company, L.P.
- Type: Holding of AT&T Mobility
- Industry: Telecommunications
- Founded: 1984
- Founder: Michael Hunt
- Defunct: 2000
- Headquarters: Houston, Texas, US
- Area served: Southeast Texas
- Parent: AT&T Mobility
- Website: houstoncellular.com at the Wayback Machine (archived 1999-02-08)

Houston Cellular was a Houston-based cell phone company which provided AMPS and D-AMPS (TDMA) service in the Greater Houston area. It was formed in 1983 and was operated as a partnership between LIN Broadcasting Corp., Mobile Communication Corp. of America and BellSouth Co. Its headquarters were located in Houston, Texas.

Through a series of acquisitions and mergers, within 10 years, the company consisted of a two-way partnership between BellSouth and AT&T Wireless. This partnership was also known as BellSouth Mobility, LLC. Houston Cellular began providing service in May 1986.

== History ==
Houston Cellular was formed as a result of the October 1983 Federal Communications Commission's ruling that set aside sufficient frequencies for the operation of two cellular systems in each metropolitan area. In the early 1990s, this ruling was expanded with the advent of the 800 and 1900 MHz protocols, which are also known as PCS). The ruling reserved one system for application by local phone companies. In Houston, the competing non-local company service was applied by GTE Mobilnet.

In June 2000, the above-mentioned FCC ruling was repealed and GTE merged with Bell Atlantic to form Verizon Wireless. At that time, AT&T Wireless sold its 55% stake in Houston Cellular to BellSouth. AT&T Wireless then bought 20 MHz of the CDMA spectrum owned by the outgoing PrimeCo (which was swallowed in the formation of Verizon Wireless). This purchase of frequencies was used to directly compete in the Houston market with D-AMPS (TDMA) service. Additionally, Southwestern Bell Mobile Systems, a division of Southwestern Bell Telephone Company, was also partnered with GTE, a partnership which that was later dissolved.

In 2001, BellSouth partnered with Southwestern Bell Mobile Systems. This partnership renamed the division from BellSouth Mobility, LLC to Cingular Wireless, LLC. It also transformed Houston Cellular into Cingular Wireless.

== Later developments ==
In 2006, the parent company of Southwestern Bell Mobile Systems, AT&T Inc., acquired BellSouth. Eventually, this led to the renaming of Cingular Wireless, LLC to AT&T Mobility, LLC. The service was later branded as "Wireless from AT&T, formerly Cingular Wireless", "Wireless from AT&T", and is now simply "AT&T".
