= Sigman =

Sigman may refer to:

- Carl Sigman (1909–2000), American songwriter
- Daniel Sigman, American geoscientist, Dusenbury Professor of Geological and Geophysical Sciences at Princeton University
- Hugo Sigman (1944), Argentine businessman
- Matthew Sigman, American chemist
- Morris Sigman (1880–1931), president of the International Ladies' Garment Workers' Union from 1923 to 1928
- Stan Sigman, president and chief executive officer of wireless at AT&T
- Stephanie Sigman, Mexican actress
- Tripp Sigman (1899–1971), Major League Baseball player who played outfield from 1929 to 1930

== Other uses ==
- Sigman, West Virginia

== See also ==
- USAHS Blanche F. Sigman, United States Army hospital ship during World War II
