= John Zeglis =

American business executive (born 1947)

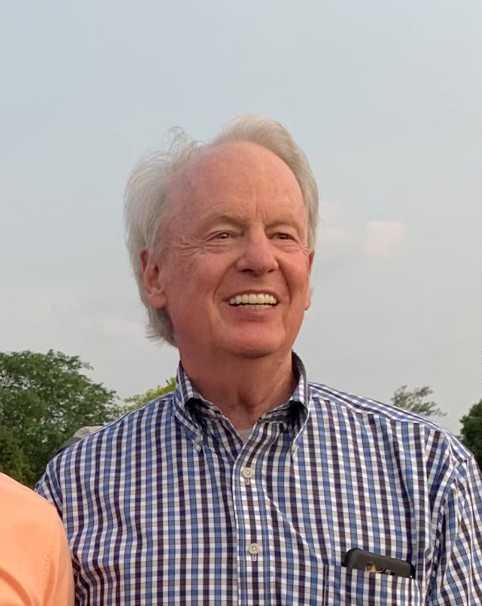
- Zeglis in 2023
- Born: May 2, 1947 (age 79); Momence, Illinois, USA
- Education: University of Illinois (B.S.); Harvard Law School (J.D.)
- Occupation: Business executive
- Children: 3 (Mark, Julie, Brian)

John D Zeglis (born May 2, 1947) is an American business executive. He served as president of AT&T from 1997 to 2001 and as chairman and chief executive officer (CEO) of AT&T Wireless from 1999 to 2004. Zeglis also co-founded the NBA G League's Indiana Mad Ants as the Fort Wayne Mad Ants in 2007 and served as president and primary shareholder of the organization until the team was acquired by Pacers Sports and Entertainment in 2015.

== Early life and education ==
Zeglis was born and brought up in the farming community of Momence, Illinois. His father, Donald, worked as a lawyer. Zeglis played basketball and golf in high school and graduated in 1965. He attended summer camp at the Culver Academies as a teenager. Zeglis went on to attend the University of Illinois College of Business for his undergraduate studies. While there, he served as the house president of Beta Theta Pi and was a member of Sigma Iota Epsilon. He was also admitted to Beta Gamma Sigma and Phi Kappa Phi. Zeglis graduated in 1969 as the valedictorian of the College of Commerce and Business Administration, now known as the Gies College of Business, with a Bachelor of Science degree in finance.

Zeglis then went on to attend Harvard Law School, where he served as the senior editor of the Harvard Law Review and graduated magna cum laude with a Juris Doctor, in 1972. Right after law school, Zeglis studied law and economics in Europe on a Knox Memorial fellowship.

== Legal and managerial career ==
Zeglis began his career in 1973 in Chicago, Illinois as an associate at the law firm now known as Sidley Austin. He became an official partner five years later in 1978. While there, he worked on the defense of the AT&T account during the antitrust lawsuit United States v. AT&T, and when the case resulted in the breakup of the AT&T/Bell System, he helped restructure the divestiture. With Zeglis' help, AT&T had successfully broken up into the "Baby Bells" by 1984. After the breakup, he left Sidney Austin and joined AT&T as a vice president and general counsel.

In early 1997 C. Michael Armstrong was named CEO of AT&T, and Armstrong appointed Zeglis as President later in that same year. Zeglis also assumed the positions of chairman and CEO of AT&T Wireless in 1999. He ended his service as president of AT&T in 2001, but he continued to serve as chairman and CEO of AT&T Wireless until it was sold to Cingular and dissolved in 2004. After the dissolution, Zeglis announced that he would be retiring from telecommunications to follow other pursuits.

== The Mad Ants and the D-League ==
In 2007, Zeglis founded the Fort Wayne Mad Ants, an NBA D-League (now G League) team. He was a primary shareholder of the team and served as president as well. The Mad Ants were the first basketball team in the Fort Wayne area since 2001, when the Fort Wayne Fury folded after a ten-year stint in the Continental Basketball Association. The nickname "Mad Ants" is a reference to 18th-century military officer "Mad" Anthony Wayne, who oversaw the construction of the original Fort Wayne. The Mad Ants originally played at the Allen County War Memorial Coliseum in Fort Wayne, Indiana. The height of the team's success with Zeglis at the helm was in 2014, when they went undefeated in the playoffs and won the 2014 NBA D-League championship.

In September 2015, the Pacers Sports and Entertainment group bought the Mad Ants and converted them into the Indiana Pacers' affiliate minor league team. This transaction was one of the hallmark steps in the development of the D-League into a one-to-one affiliate league with the NBA, more similar to the minor league system in American baseball. The D-League is now known as the G League due to the multimillion-dollar sponsorship deal between the NBA and Gatorade in 2015. The Mad Ants moved to Noblesville, Indiana in 2023 and became known as the Indiana Mad Ants.

== Board service ==
Zeglis has served on a number of corporate, educational and philanthropic boards of trustees and directors, shown below:

- Sara Lee Corporation - international consumer-goods company
- Helmerich and Payne Corporation - international petroleum company
- Illinova Corporation - energy company, subsidiary of Dynegy
- The Brookings Institution - think tank based in Washington, DC
- Kellogg School - School of Management at Northwestern University
- State Farm - insurance company with headquarters in Bloomington, IL
- Gies College - College of Business at the University of Illinois Urbana-Champaign
- George Washington University - four-year institution in Washington, DC
- Manchester University, a private university in North Manchester, Indiana (formerly known as Manchester College)

== Current life ==
Zeglis, 79, is now retired and resides near Culver, Indiana with his wife Carol on the eastern shore of Lake Maxinkuckee. He frequently takes part in Culver Academy events, an example being an alumni address in 2019 that he participated in along with one of his sons, Mark, and his daughter, Julie. Zeglis reflected on how his experiences at the Academy taught him how to deal with decision-making and uncertainty, which helped him work through things at AT&T and Sidley Austin that “[he] had never done before”.
