= SunCom =

American mobile cellular provider

SunCom Wireless Holdings, Inc.
- Type: Public
- Traded as: NYSE: TPC
- Industry: Wireless Services
- Founded: 1999; 27 years ago
- Defunct: 2008
- Fate: Acquired
- Successor: T-Mobile USA
- Headquarters: Berwyn, Pennsylvania, United States
- Key people: Michael E. Kalogris (chairman & CEO); Eric Haskell (EVP & CFO)
- Products: GSM, GPRS, Text messaging, Picture messaging

SunCom Wireless Holdings, Inc. was a wireless carrier that operated in the Southeastern United States from 1999 to 2008, and in parts of the Caribbean starting in 2004.

As of the third quarter of 2007, SunCom was providing digital wireless communications services to approximately 1.1 million customers and employed more than 1,900 people. In February 2008, SunCom was acquired by T-Mobile USA, Inc., a subsidiary of Deutsche Telekom AG. The company traded on the NYSE under the TPC ticker symbol.

In September 2008, the SunCom brand was phased out and rebranded under the T-Mobile name.

== History ==
Founded in January 1999 as Triton PCS Holdings by Mark Balfour, SunCom has gone through many deals with other cellular carriers. The SunCom brand was actually used by three separate companies in the beginning, Triton, TeleCorp and Tritel, all working in cooperation with one another and in partnership with AT&T Wireless. Tritel was purchased by TeleCorp in 2001, with AT&T Wireless finalizing its purchase of TeleCorp in 2003. By 1995, Suncom was developed and had a significant share of the wireless market. In December 2004, SunCom acquired 29,139 customers from Cingular Wireless as part of a deal of exchanging towers. In March 2005, SunCom sold 169 cell towers in North Carolina, South Carolina, and Puerto Rico to Global Signal Acquisitions. SunCom formed an agreement with Global Signal Acquisitions in June 2005 to lease tower space that they subsequently sold. In October 2005, SunCom agreed to sell the 29,139 customers from the deal in 2004 back to Cingular.

On September 17, 2007, T-Mobile USA Inc. announced it would acquire SunCom for approximately $1.6 billion in cash and $800 million in assumed debt. The deal closed on February 22, 2008.

== Cellular services ==
SunCom's operations provided service across North Carolina, South Carolina, northern Georgia, parts of eastern Tennessee, central Arkansas and southwest Virginia, as well as Puerto Rico and the U.S. Virgin Islands. Beginning in 2001, SunCom merged with AT&T Wireless that served states in the Great Lakes area including Wisconsin, Illinois, and Michigan. This was short lived and lasted only a year.

As of 2007, SunCom Wireless provided wireless service utilizing the GSM standard and operating in the 1900MHz PCS frequency-band, except for one 800MHz license in CMA 629 (Myrtle Beach, SC). Originally, SunCom utilized TDMA as its technology platform when it constructed its wireless network in 1999 and began offering service. In 2003, the company began overlaying GSM, along with its associated GPRS technology, completing the upgrade by June 2004 and enabling access across SunCom's footprint. At the time, this was a significant upgrade from TDMA as GSM/GPRS offered more advanced wireless capabilities including data and video transmission.

Suncom Wireless operated in two separate and distinct regional areas: one in the Southeast U.S. and one in the Caribbean.

=== Southeast U.S. operations ===
Former Caribbean headquarters of SunCom in San Juan, Puerto Rico.

The company's Southeast operations provided service across North and South Carolina, eastern Georgia, northeastern Tennessee, and southwestern Virginia. SunCom owned wireless licenses in the "28 Basic Trading Areas" as defined by the FCC which covered SunCom Wireless's southeast region. These licenses included the major metropolitan areas of Charlotte, Greensboro, Raleigh-Durham-Cary, and Charleston and in aggregate encompass a population of over 14 million people.

SunCom Wireless completed the migration of its remaining TDMA Customer Base to GSM on September 30, 2006. In the final days of its operation, SunCom Wireless only operated on the GSM platform.

=== Caribbean operations ===
In the Caribbean, SunCom operated in Puerto Rico and the U.S. Virgin Islands. The company owned 3 wireless licenses covering this territory, which had a population of more than 4 million people.
