= Indigo Wireless =

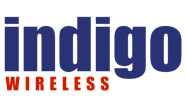
- Type: Private
- Industry: Wireless Services
- Founded: 1991
- Headquarters: Wellsboro, Pennsylvania, United States
- Products: GSM, EDGE, UMTS, and LTE (wireless voice and data services), SMS (text messaging), MMS (picture messaging), business and residential wireless internet
- Website: indigowireless.com

Indigo Wireless was a regional wireless telecommunications company in northern Pennsylvania. Based in Wellsboro, it was often the sole provider in its area and was a local roaming partner for both AT&T and T-Mobile.

== Network ==
Indigo's wireless network included EDGE and GPRS data technology as well as UMTS. Both the 2G and 3G networks were run on the Cellular 850 MHz band due to the mountainous terrain of northern Pennsylvania. Indigo also held PCS 1900 MHz licenses in the majority of its coverage area and used it to provide GSM or LTE fixed wireless internet depending on location. Their website advertised them as having the most towers in Tioga County, where they were based.

=== Roaming ===
Customers of many different providers could freely roam onto Indigo's GSM and UMTS networks and had access to full voice and data services depending on the roaming agreement. Indigo was a member of the GSMA and has previously maintained many domestic and international roaming agreements with a variety of partner networks.

== History ==
Indigo Wireless began in 1991 as the Americell PA-3 Partnership, acquiring the FCC license for Rural Service Area PA-3 (Potter, Clinton, and Tioga Counties). In 1992, it received $8 million to build a cellular network in Northern Pennsylvania, launching service in Lock Haven. In 1993, Indigo activated its first tower in Mansfield and began selling analog service under the name of Cellular One of Tioga. By 1994, it had roaming agreements with 300 U.S. and Canadian carriers so their customers could travel with their phones outside of northern Pennsylvania.

In 1997, Indigo (CellOne of Tioga) started upgrading their network to digital. Indigo's digital service rollout in the RSA PA-3 area happened before many Pennsylvania cities, such as Harrisburg, even got basic digital service. In 2000, after AT&T had left the Cellular One group and Southwestern Bell and Bell South had left in order to become Cingular Wireless, Indigo finally changed its name from Cellular One of Tioga to Indigo Wireless.

2003 gave Indigo licenses to operate in Bradford, Sullivan, and Wyoming counties after working closely with AT&T Wireless. In 2004, Indigo began upgrading to GSM in every area it covered. This new use of GSM technology allowed Indigo customers to use data on their phones and computers via the Indigo network. Indigo Wireless was the only GSM provider in parts of northern PA and had provided service to customers from other carriers who roamed onto their network.

In late 2010, Indigo began offering high-speed broadband Internet service to residents of Tioga County utilizing fixed point-to-multipoint wireless equipment from Ubiquiti Networks. This equipment has the capabilities to provide service speeds of over 1 Gbit/s of Internet service to resident and businesses throughout the coverage area. Services were being marked and sold under the Xtreme Internet name. Indigo also offered residential and business internet through its 3G and LTE networks.

In July 2023, Indigo announced via public filing that they were leaving the retail wireless business and leasing their 850 licenses to AT&T. By the end of 2024, the rest of their network has fully shut down and their website has closed. They ended with 400 mobile wireless customers. Indigo's exit mirrors a broader trend among regional carriers struggling to compete with major providers, particularly due to rising 5G upgrade costs.
