= Stan Sigman =

US telecommunications executive

- Born: Stanley T. Sigman; March 31, 1947
- Died: December 21, 2020 (aged 73)
- Education: West Texas State University
- Years active: 1965–2020

Stanley T. Sigman (March 31, 1947–December 21, 2020) was the former Chief Executive Officer of Cingular Wireless at AT&T, the United States's largest wireless provider.

== Career ==
A graduate of West Texas State University in Canyon, Texas, Sigman began his career with Southwestern Bell Telephone as a stockman in Hereford, Texas, in 1965.

A long-time wireless industry leader, Sigman held leadership positions at SBC Communications, where he helped start SBC's wireless business in the mid-1980s, managed its expansion into one of the largest wireless businesses in the nation, and directed its integration into BellSouth's wireless group to form Cingular Wireless in 2001.

Prior to joining Cingular, Sigman served as group president and chief operating officer for SBC Communications, responsible for the company's wireline and wholesale operations. Sigman's career has included leading key business units for SBC, including Long Distance, Messaging, Global Accounts, Sterling Commerce, DataComm, Web Hosting, eCommerce, TRI, Network Planning and Engineering, Network Operations, Business and Consumer Marketing and Operator Services.

Sigman was long regarded as a Wireless industry visionary as well as a champion for wireless safety and technology. He served as chairman emeritus of the board of directors of the Cellular Telecommunications and Internet Association (CTIA). The CTIA is the international organization representing all sectors of wireless communications—cellular, personal communication services, and enhanced specialized mobile radio.

In September 2004, Sigman was appointed to the President's National Security Telecommunications Advisory Committee (NSTAC) by President George W. Bush. In its advisory role to the President, the NSTAC provides industry-based analyses and recommendations on a wide range of policy and technical issues related to telecommunications, information assurance, infrastructure protection, and other national security and emergency preparedness matters.

In December 2004, Sigman was named RCR Wireless News "Person of the Year," in part for his orchestration of the Cingular Wireless acquisition of AT&T Wireless, creating the largest cellular wireless carrier in the US.

Sigman was named a member of Atlanta Alexis de Tocqueville Society in recognition of his service and commitment to the United Way. He is also a member of the Georgia Research Advisory Board and the Georgia Institute of Technology Advisory Board.

Sigman announced his retirement as CEO of AT&T Mobility on October 11, 2007. He remained with AT&T Mobility until the end of the calendar year to assist with the leadership change. Ralph de la Vega took his place as CEO.

In October 2010, Sigman was inducted into the Wireless Hall of Fame. Steve Jobs attended the induction ceremony.

After retiring, Sigman founded Namgis Quarter Horses in Hondo, Texas. A division of his Santa Cruz Ranch, Namgis Quarter Horses, includes a state-of-the-art breeding and training facility for American Quarter Horse roping horses and barrel racing horses.

Sigman also became a partner in the Ruidoso Downs Race Track & Casino operation in Ruidoso, New Mexico.

Sigman died December 21, 2020.

== In popular culture ==
Sigman was portrayed in the 2023 film Blackberry, directed by Matt Johnson. Footage of him and Steve Jobs presenting the original iPhone at the 2007 Macworld Keynote was shown. His voice was also portrayed by Canadian actor Evan Buliung during a phone call with Jim Balsillie, played by Glen Howerton.
