= Arena Place =

Two office towers and a theater in Texas, US

Coordinates: 29.7019°N 95.5175°W

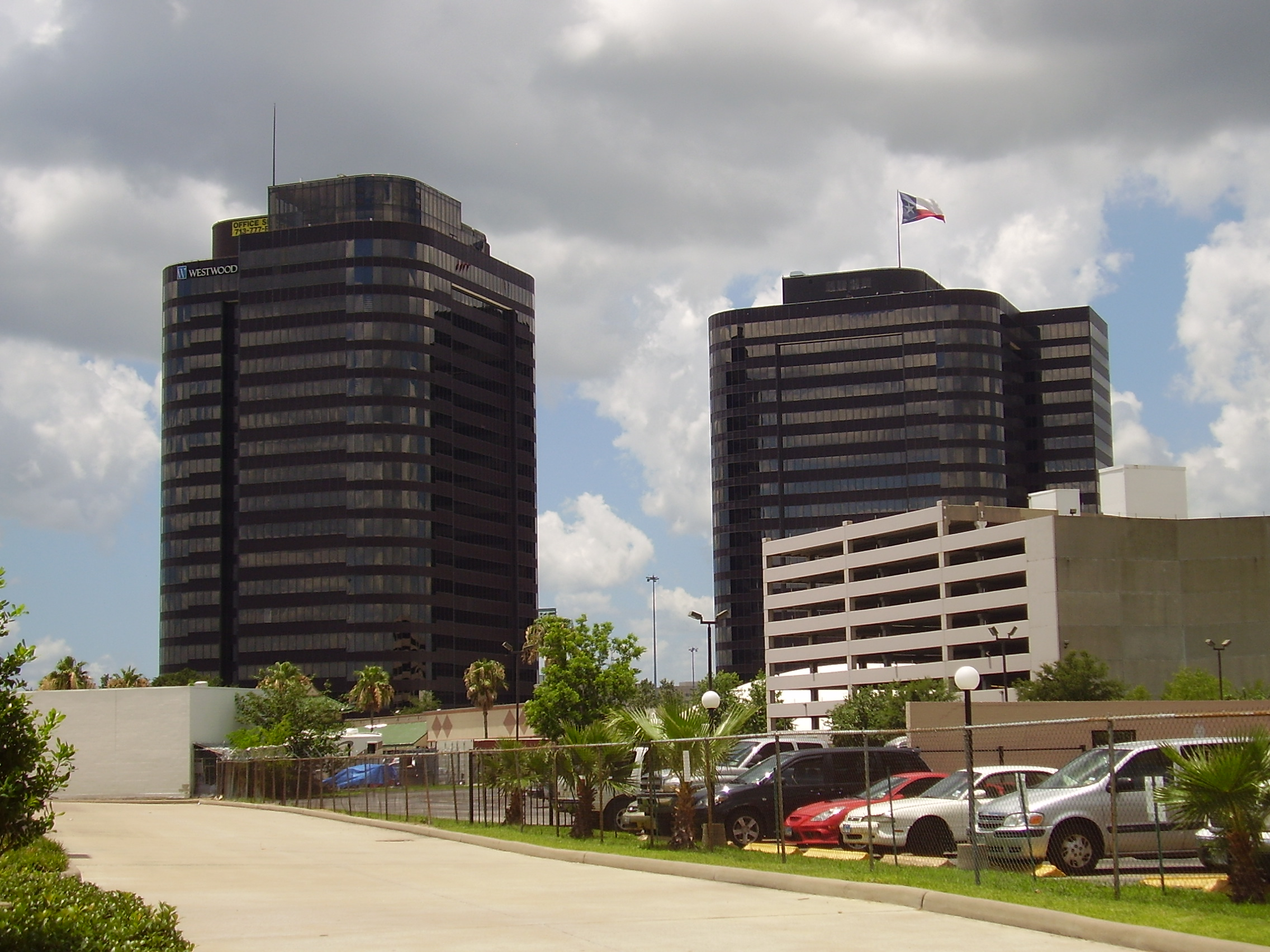
Arena Place

Arena Place is a complex including two office towers and a theater located in Sharpstown, Southwest Management District, Houston, Texas. It was built in Sharpstown Commercial Park.

The complex, located on Highway 59 and (Southwest Freeway), includes One & Two Arena Place, two 19-story towers each with about 390,000 square feet (36,000 m^{2}) of space, the Arena Theatre, a live performance theater with a 2,850 seats, and two nine story parking garages with a total of 2,200 spaces. Due to the facility's circular shape, all of its seats are no further than 65 feet (20 m) from the stage. Because of the presence of the garages, the theater has on-site parking. The complex has a two-story, 6,000 square feet (560 m^{2}) office tower penthouse. The complex is located near PlazAmericas (formerly Sharpstown Mall). The concession stands are located inside the theater. The complex, which has Class A office space, is located in proximity to the 610 Loop, Beltway 8, and the Westpark Tollway.

== History ==
The Arena Theatre, built in 1965 and originally called the Houston Music Theatre, is owned by a partnership which owns the office buildings. Bob Hope, a comedian, was an investor in the original Arena Theatre. The towers, colored black, were developed in the early 1980s by Melvin Lane Powers. Powers built a personal penthouse on top of one of the towers and received a lot of attention for this. The penthouse, located in Arena Tower I, had a helicopter pad and a private swimming pool on the rooftop. Robert Williamson of the firm Holliday Fenoglio Fowler said that the Powers case was "pretty celebrated" and that the complex was "very storied." Williamson described Powers as a "very flamboyant developer." The complex was the most well-known development established by Powers.

Powers filed for bankruptcy. Afterwards, in 1986, Powers attempted to claim Arena Tower I, the north side tower, as his personal residence to prevent foreclosure. Bank of America repossessed the building and evicted Powers. Lawrence Wong, a real estate developer, acquired tower one from Bank of America in 1989. In 1990 he acquired the second tower from the Midland Bank of England. Laura A. Stromberg of the Houston Business Journal said that when Wong purchased the buildings, they were "substantially vacant." At the time a 200,000 square feet (19,000 m^{2}) block of space in tower one was vacant.

In 1997 Arena Tower I was 88% leased and Arena Tower II was 73% leased. During that year Houston Cellular was the main tenant in Arena Tower I, and the building was named after the company. Other tenants in the Arena Towers included Houston Allstate, LTD Financial Services, and Prudential. During that year Logan Brown, a senior vice president of Grubb & Ellis, a real estate firm, said that the buildings were worth $30 million. Brown also said that they were "in poor condition" and needed updating. In 1997 Stromberg said that, according to real estate sources, the towers were reportedly under a contract of sale to Texas Commercial Properties Inc. Stromberg said that the sale would be the largest transaction of Class B office space in 13 years.

For many years the Arena Theatre was operated by H'Town Arena, a tenant. In December 2004 the Arena Group and two limited partners bought the entire Arena Place complex from Lennar Partners for about $24.5 million. At the same time Transwestern Commercial Services replaced PM Realty Group as the agency that manages and provides leases for the property. H'Town Arena had stopped leasing in the theater days before the sale occurred, and as a result the theater stopped operating. As of 2004 the Class B office space in the complex was about 70% occupied, and the tenants included several large call centers.

In September 2006 the limited partners sold their stake, which was 50 percent, to Boxer Property. Since the acquisition occurred, all of the buildings underwent renovations. As of 2007 the office towers had an occupancy rate of around 70 percent. As of that year most of its tenants were professional groups and included 25 law firms, medical users, radio stations, and television stations. As of the same year Westwood College occupied several floors in the complex. By that year $5 million in capital investments had been made to the towers. A total of $6 million was invested into the renovation of the towers. As part of a $1 million renovation, the Arena Theater was scheduled to re-open on November 9, 2007. Arena Theatre Inc. became the new tenant of the theater. As part of the renovation the theater received new carpeting, new lighting and sound systems, repaired seats, modernized toilet facilities, and a video system. The ceiling was altered absorb sound instead of reflecting sound. The operators also planned to hold events in the office tower penthouse. In 2009 Affiliated Computer Services announced that it was going to add 120 job positions to its call center in Arena Tower II; after hiring was scheduled to be complete, the company planned to have 400 employees in its Arena Place operation. As of 2016, Xerox Business Services (after acquiring ACS in late 2009) is currently managing a 400-seat call center for CVS Pharmacy in Arena Tower II.

== Tenants ==
The College of Health Care Professions' Southwest Houston, TX Campus is located at One Arena Place, 7322 Southwest Freeway, Suite 110, Houston, Texas USA.

The China Airlines Houston Mini Office (Chinese: T: 休士頓營業所, S: 休士顿营业所, P: Xiūshìdùn Yíngyèsuǒ) is located in Suite 204 of Two Arena Place.

Westwood College's Houston South Campus was located in One Arena Place. 713radio.net
