= Samsung SGH-X427m =

Mobile phone in the Samsung SGH series

- Manufacturer: Samsung Electronics
- Series: X series SGH series
- Family: Samsung SGH
- First released: "United States" August 13, 2004; 22 years ago (Cingular Wireless)
- Availability by region: 2003
- Discontinued: 2006
- Predecessor: Samsung X426/X427
- Compatible networks: GSM 850 1900; GPRS
- Form factor: Clamshell
- Dimensions: 3.3"x1.8"x0.8"
- Weight: 79g (2.8oz)
- Operating system: Proprietary
- SIM: Mini SIM
- Battery: 700mAh li-ion User replaceable
- Charging: Samsung Charge/Data connector
- Rear camera: None
- Display: TFT LCD; 128x160 px
- External display: Tri-color LED
- Sound: 2.5mm mono headset jack
- Connectivity: WAP 2.0 wireless
- Made in: 2004
- Other: USB data transfer

The Samsung SGH-X427m is a mobile phone in the Samsung SGH series. It was originally released as the X426 and X427 in 2003.

== History ==
=== X426 and X427 ===
The X427m’s predecessor, the X426 was released in 2003 on AT&T Wireless, with a Cingular version, the X427 releasing swiftly after the original X426.

=== X427m ===
The X427m released in 2004 and is virtually identical to the X427 and X426 models before it, except for slight cosmetic differences and MMS support.

== Design ==
The X427m retains the lightweight silver polycarbonate bodies of the X426 and X427, now with an aluminum front jewel sporting the Samsung and Cingular logos. A tri-color LED also previously found on the X426 and X427 used for notifications, service status, alarms, etc is found below the antenna. The interior of the phone has the 128x160 TFT LCD, earpiece, and keypad, with the Cingular logo now adorning the select button, instead of the M-Mode and I icons on the previous models’ select buttons.

== Reviews ==
The SGH-X427m has a consumer rating of 3 out of 5 stars on CNET. The phone was described as not being a full feature phone but being small and light weight.

== Related Phones ==
- SGH-X426: AT&T version, identical to X426 aside from a different outer faceplate.
- SGH-X427: Identical to the X427m but subtracts MMS support and a refreshed UI.
