= Unicel =

Rural Cellular Corporation
- Industry: Communications Services
- Founded: 1990
- Defunct: 2008
- Fate: Acquired by Verizon
- Headquarters: Alexandria, Minnesota
- Key people: Richard P. Ekstrand, President & CEO
- Products: Telecommunications

Unicel was a brand of mobile phone service from Rural Cellular Corporation. Service was provided in northern Minnesota, northern New England, Mississippi, Alabama, eastern Washington and Oregon, and adjacent areas. The company was headquartered in Alexandria, Minnesota. Until 2005, RCC also operated 850 MHz cellular service under the brand name Cellular 2000. On January 25, 2009 Verizon Wireless officially took over all operations of Unicel.

Unicel offers 850 MHz and 1900 MHz (PCS) service largely using GSM technology, but much of its Minnesota territory uses competing cdmaOne instead. Legacy AMPS and D-AMPS phones are commonly in use as well. The use of both GSM and CDMA reflects the fact that the Unicel service area has been assembled through the acquisitions of other wireless carriers.

On July 30, 2007, Rural Cellular Corporation announced it agreed to be acquired by Verizon Wireless (a CDMA carrier). Verizon said that it plans to convert RCC's GSM customers to CDMA technology, but it will continue to operate RCC's current GSM network in order to generate roaming revenue. On 4 October 2007, Rural Cellular Corporation announced that its shareholders voted to approve the merger agreement providing for the acquisition of Rural Cellular Corporation by Verizon Wireless for approximately $2.67 billion in cash and assumed debt.

On December 4, 2007, Verizon announced that it would swap some of its RCC properties with AT&T in exchange for some properties from Dobson Cellular, which AT&T recently acquired.

On June 10, 2008, The Department of Justice has said that in order to acquire Rural Cellular Corporation, Verizon Wireless must divest some of RCC's existing wireless assets including Vermont, New York, and Washington states. The DOJ has filed a lawsuit that will force Verizon Wireless to comply with the divestiture before the acquisition can proceed.

The FCC approved the acquisition on August 5, 2008. Approval depended on the sale of towers in six key market areas, including all of Vermont, in order to ensure that the acquisition wouldn't be anti-competitive in those areas. Verizon must also continue to maintain Unicel's GSM towers in other markets if it does not choose to sell them.

On August 7, 2008, Verizon Wireless announced they had completed the purchase of Rural Cellular Corporation for $2.66 billion in cash and assumed debt.

On December 22, 2008, AT&T announced that it would complete its takeover of UNICEL's Vermont shares and begin to roll out its phones, brand and contracts to its wireless customers in Vermont, New York, and Washington State.

UNICEL still offers phone service in two states as these areas were not included in the Verizon Wireless acquisition. UNICEL's service in these states will eventually change to a different wireless provider.

As of August 24, 2011 the UNICEL website has been completely shut down.
