= Advanced Mobile Phone Service =

Advanced Mobile Phone Service, Inc.
- Type: Defunct
- Industry: Telecommunications
- Founded: 1978
- Defunct: 1984
- Products: AMPS
- Parent: AT&T (1983-1984)

Advanced Mobile Phone Service, Inc. was a subsidiary of AT&T prior to the Bell System Divestiture. Abbreviated AMPS, the company was created in 1978 to build and operate the new Advanced Mobile Phone System, also abbreviated AMPS. AMPS was developed by Bell Labs to replace older, severely limited radiophone services, such as IMTS.

AMPS was one of first providers of cellular phone service, starting in Chicago on October 13, 1983, and in the Washington, D.C., area December 1983. After divestiture, AMPS was divided among the 7 newly created Regional Holding Companies, now known as RBOCs:

- NYNEX Mobile Communications
- Bell Atlantic Mobile Systems
- Ameritech Mobile Communications
- BellSouth Mobility
- PacTel Mobile Access
- Southwestern Bell Mobile Systems
- U S West NewVector

== Evolution of Successor Companies ==
Through a series of mergers, acquisitions, and re-consolidation among the Baby Bells, these 7 original mobile operating companies are now split as such -

- AT&T Mobility
  - Ameritech Mobile Communications
  - BellSouth Mobility
  - Southwestern Bell Mobile Systems
- Verizon Wireless
  - Bell Atlantic Mobile Systems
  - NYNEX Mobile Communications
  - AirTouch
    - PacTel Mobile Access
    - U S WEST NewVector

PacTel Mobile Access and U S WEST NewVector are owned by Verizon Wireless due to its co-ownership by Vodafone. PacTel Mobile Access was spun off into AirTouch in 1994, and U S WEST NewVector was spun off and merged into AirTouch in 1997. AirTouch was then acquired by Vodafone in 1999. Bell Atlantic and Vodafone combined their wireless operations to form Verizon Wireless in 2000.

Ameritech's Chicago n/w was divested and sold to GTE Wireless in 1999 as a condition of the former's merger with SBC Communications. In 2000, Bell Atlantic bought GTE and changed its name to Verizon Communications; at that point, GTE Wireless became part of Verizon Wireless.
