= Dobson Cellular =

Dobson Cellular Systems, Inc.
- Type: Division
- Industry: Telecommunications
- Founded: 1920
- Defunct: November 15, 2007
- Fate: Acquired
- Successor: AT&T Mobility, LLC.
- Headquarters: Oklahoma City, Oklahoma, USA
- Key people: Everett R. Dobson – Chairman; Steven P. Dussek – CEO & president
- Products: AMPS, D-AMPS, GSM, GPRS, EDGE, SMS, MMS
- Services: Wireless company
- Parent: Dobson Communications (1920-2007); AT&T Mobility (2007-present)

Dobson Cellular Systems, Inc. now part of AT&T Mobility, was a wireless telecommunications provider operating in several regions of the United States, including Alaska, Arizona, California, Kansas, Kentucky, Maryland, Michigan, Minnesota, Missouri, New York, Ohio, Oklahoma, Pennsylvania, Texas, Virginia, West Virginia and Wisconsin. Dobson Cellular Systems was a wholly owned subsidiary of Dobson Communications Corporation based in Oklahoma City. It was the provider of Cellular One-branded services in the United States. Dobson operated under the brand name of Cellular One, and provided service on a D-AMPS and GSM network. The company purchased the rights to the Cellular One name from Alltel in December 2005.

== Corporate history ==
Formed in the 1920s, Dobson Communications originally operated a small wireline telephone network in Oklahoma. Over 70 years, Dobson evolved to become the nation's largest independent rural wireless provider to expand operations into 60 markets, following acquisitions over the last 10 years.

On June 29, 2007 AT&T Inc. announced that they had reached an agreement to purchase Dobson Cellular division. The closing price was US$2.8B or US$13 per share. AT&T also agreed to assume the outstanding debt of US$2.3B.

The sale completed on November 15, 2007, with market transition beginning December 9, 2007. The Cellular One brand name was sold to Trilogy Partners in February 2008.

The Federal government prevented AT&T from taking certain Dobson markets In Texas, Oklahoma, and Kentucky along the Ohio border and the I-75 corridor, due to the potential monopoly this would create in this area. After placing these markets in a trust for one year, the Kentucky markets were sold to Verizon Wireless in November 2008 with market transition to be completed by November 2009, and the others, TX-10 and OK-5, were sold to affiliates of MTPCS, LLC, which concurrently adopted the Cellular One brand under a license agreement with Trilogy Partners.

== Network ==
Dobson was, for the most part, a rural provider. It claimed to be the largest provider of cellular services in Alaska as well as Michigan. It was also the exclusive provider of GSM technology in many of its markets and has a few resellers such as TracFone and smaller MVNOs in particular states. It also provided voice and data roaming capability for many AT&T and T-Mobile customers. Dobson had recently upgraded a majority of its GSM/GPRS towers with an EDGE overlay, providing an even faster data rate for their customers.
