= Hicap =

Hicap is a mobile technology developed by Nippon Telegraph and Telephone as a higher capacity alternative to their NTT mobile solution.

Hicap uses a 25 kHz carrier and uses FDMA to separate different calls from each other.
