= Sigman, West Virginia =

Sigman
- Unincorporated community
- Location within the state of West Virginia Sigman (the United States)
- Coordinates: 38°34′54″N 81°45′32″W
- Country: United States
- State: West Virginia
- County: Putnam
- Elevation: 1,050 ft (320 m)
- Time zone: UTC-5 (Eastern (EST))
  - Summer (DST): UTC-4 (EDT)
- GNIS ID: 1546770

Sigman is an unincorporated community in Putnam County, West Virginia, United States.
