= Ralph de la Vega =

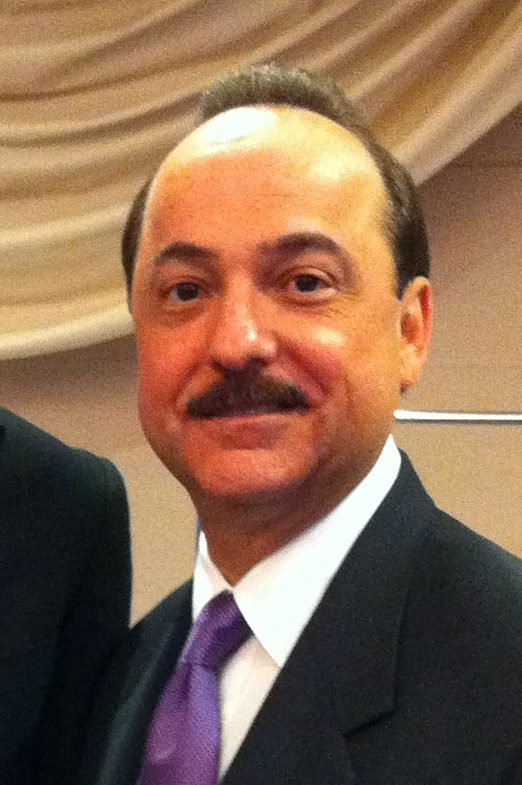
- Ralph de la Vega
- Born: Cuba
- Education: Miami Dade College; Florida Atlantic University; Northern Illinois University (MBA); University of Virginia
- Occupation: Business executive
- Years active: 1974–present
- Notable work: Obstacles Welcome: How to Turn Adversity to Advantage in Business and Life
- Title: Former Vice Chairman of AT&T Inc. and CEO of AT&T Business Solutions and AT&T International
- Board member of: American Express; New York Life; Amdocs Corporation; Ubicquia; JA Worldwide
- Awards: Emory University's Global Innovation Award; Honorary Doctorate from Florida Atlantic University

Ralph de la Vega is the former Vice Chairman of AT&T Inc. and CEO of AT&T Business Solutions and AT&T International. He has previously served as President & CEO of AT&T Mobile & Business Solutions; President and CEO of AT&T Mobility; COO of Cingular Wireless; President of BellSouth Latin America Operations; and the President of Broadband and Internet Services for BellSouth. He is also the author of the 2009 book Obstacles Welcome: How to Turn Adversity to Advantage in Business and Life. Ralph de la Vega retired December 31, 2016, after a 42-year career with AT&T.

== Early life and education ==
Ralph de la Vega was born in Cuba, and emigrated to the United States in 1962, at the age of ten. In an effort to flee the Castro dictatorship in that country, his family attempted to board a plane to Miami; however the border official stated that only Ralph's papers were in order. He was sent to the US alone, where he stayed with the friend of an aunt. It took four years for his parents to join him. Once his parents arrived, de la Vega took an after-school job sweeping the floors of a garment factory to help support the family. He was then promoted, and started making money selling the clothing made by the company.

De la Vega eventually enrolled in a pre-engineering curriculum at Miami Dade College, and worked part-time as a draftsman at an engineering firm. He then received his bachelor's degree in mechanical engineering from Florida Atlantic University. He later received an MBA from Northern Illinois University. He also completed the Executive Program at the University of Virginia and received an honorary doctorate from Florida Atlantic.

== BellSouth ==
De la Vega started his career in 1974 with BellSouth (then Southern Bell) as a management assistant. Over the years he held positions in Network Planning, Consumer Services, Engineering, and DSL and Operations. In 1985 he became a director at the Bell's Communications Research Technical Education Center (Bellcore TEC). He was later made responsible for all BellSouth Telecommunications Network Operations in Florida, Alabama, Mississippi and Louisiana. Afterwards he became the president of BellSouth Broadband Internet Services. De la Vega eventually became the president of BellSouth Latin America, a role he held from 2002 to 2003. In this job he was in charge of the wireless subsidiaries in eleven countries: Argentina, Brazil, Chile, Colombia, Ecuador, Guatemala, Nicaragua, Panama, Peru, Uruguay, and Venezuela. The CEOs of each company reported to de la Vega, who restructured the decision-making infrastructure of the group in order to create cooperative strategies and policies between the different firms. At the end of his first year as president, BellSouth Latin America turned a profit for the first time.

== AT&T ==
De la Vega served as the chief operating officer of Cingular Wireless, starting in 2004. In 2007 Cingular was acquired by SBC (itself later renamed AT&T), and he was named CEO of AT&T Mobility. De la Vega was one of the leaders of the merger. At AT&T de la Vega formed relationships between the company's mobile unit and automobile manufacturers, including General Motors, in order to grow the company's market for car connectivity. He also pushed for promotions intended to draw subscribers away from AT&T's competitors. He also brought the iPhone to the company. De la Vega was the CEO of AT&T Mobility until 2014, when he was promoted to president and CEO of AT&T's combined Mobile & Business Solutions group. One of the main goals of de la Vega in this position is to develop AT&T's role in the Internet of Things and to deliver integrated services to business customers. In 2016 he became the Vice Chairman of AT&T Inc. and CEO of AT&T Business Solutions and AT&T International. Ralph De la Vega retired from this position on 31 December 2016.

== Obstacles Welcome ==
In 2009 de la Vega coauthored the book Obstacles Welcome: How to Turn Adversity to Advantage in Business and Life, with Paul Brown. De la Vega decided to write the work due to the response he was receiving after the speeches he delivered at speaking engagements. The goal of the book was to provide career and life advice to youth and young professionals. The book contains "four pillars of success" and "six pivotal points" in which he uses his personal story to structure his advice. De la Vega has also written for periodicals including Cnet.

== Recognition ==
De la Vega was selected Executive of the Year by the Association of Latino Professionals in Finance and Accounting and has been listed as one of America's "50 Most Important Hispanics in Technology and Business." He is a past member of the board of Junior Achievement of Georgia, where he serves as the chairman of the JA Hispanic Initiative, a program to encourage Hispanic students to remain in school and prepare for success in the U.S. business world. In addition, he has served on the board of directors for the Atlanta Symphony Orchestra and the Georgia Aquarium. He is a member of the National Executive Board of the Boy Scouts of America, the organization's governing body and is a board member for the Georgia chapter of the Boy Scouts of America. De la Vega was featured in HBO's The Latino List pt.2 where he discussed his background along with other impactful Latinos. In 2011 he was awarded the Emory University's Global Innovation Award. He has also been a Trustee of Morehouse College. De la Vega was inducted into the Wireless Hall of Fame in 2016.

== See also ==
- List of chief executive officers
