= Southwestern Bell Mobile Systems =

Former telephone company

Southwestern Bell Wireless logo

Southwestern Bell Mobile Systems, Inc. was a wireless telephone company. It was created in 1984 as a split-off of Advanced Mobile Phone Service, the original wireless subsidiary of the Bell System. It was a division of Southwestern Bell Corporation.

It continued to operate as Southwestern Bell Mobile Systems until 2000, when SBC Communications and BellSouth combined their wireless operations into a single company, Cingular Wireless. Southwestern Bell Mobile Systems' assets were then transferred to a Cingular as a limited liability company named Cingular Southwestern Bell Mobile Systems, LLC. The company existed until 2006 when it was dissolved.

Southwestern Bell Mobile Systems' physical assets survive in what is now AT&T Mobility.
