= AT&T Wireless Services =

Former American wireless carrier

AT&T Wireless Services, Inc.
- Formerly: McCaw Cellular Communications; AT&T Wireless Services
- Type: Public
- Traded as: NYSE: AWE
- Industry: Telecommunications
- Founded: 1987; 39 years ago
- Founder: Craig McCaw
- Defunct: April 26, 2005; 21 years ago
- Headquarters: Redmond, Washington, U.S.
- Key people: John D. Zeglis
- Products: GoPhone
- Owner: Craig McCaw (1987–1994)
- Parent: AT&T Corporation (1994–2001); AT&T Mobility (2005)

AT&T Wireless Services, Inc., formerly part of AT&T Corporation, was a Wireless telephone carrier founded in 1987 in the United States, based in Redmond, Washington, and later traded on the New York Stock Exchange under the stock symbol "AWE", as a separate entity from its former parent.

On October 26, 2004, AT&T Wireless was acquired by Cingular Wireless, a joint venture of SBC Communications and BellSouth, to form the largest wireless carrier in the United States at the time. On November 16, 2004, AT&T Wireless stores were rechristened under the Cingular banner. The legal entity "AT&T Wireless Services, Inc." was renamed "New Cingular Wireless Services, Inc."

In late 2005, SBC (the majority partner in Cingular) acquired the original AT&T, and rebranded as "the new AT&T". Cingular became wholly owned by the new AT&T in December 2006 as a result of the new AT&T's acquisition of BellSouth. After the merger, Cingular was renamed AT&T Mobility in late 2006 and remained the largest wireless carrier until 2009 when Verizon Wireless acquired Alltel to become the largest wireless service provider by a number of subscribers.

== History ==
=== McCaw Cellular ===
AT&T Wireless began in 1987 as McCaw Cellular Communications, a cellular telephone pioneer in the United States. Savvy licensing of cellular spectrum in the early 1980s put McCaw Cellular in an extremely strong position, quickly outpacing the growth of the "Baby Bells" in the emerging market. The company purchased MCI Communications's mobile businesses in 1986, followed by LIN Broadcasting in 1989, giving them widespread access in all of the major US markets. Partnering with AT&T as a technology provider, McCaw introduced their "Cellular One" service in 1990, the first truly national cellular system. AT&T purchased 33% of the company in 1992 and arranged a merger in 1994 that made Craig McCaw one of AT&T's largest shareholders. In 2002, the company was spun off from AT&T to become AT&T Wireless Services.

In 1966, J. Elroy McCaw sold one of his cable television holdings in Centralia, Washington to his three sons, including Craig, who was 16 years old at the time. Craig took an increasingly central role in the development of McCaw Communications, and by the early 1980s had grown the company from 2,000 subscribers to about $5 million in annual revenue.

In 1981 McCaw came across an AT&T document about the future of cellular telephony, which predicted that by the start of the 21st century there would be 900,000 cellular subscribers in the United States. Intrigued, McCaw found that the licenses for cellular spectrum were being sold at $4.50 per "pop", meaning he could build a base for future subscribers for very low cost. By 1983, McCaw Communications had purchased licenses in six of the 30 largest US markets. McCaw then succeeded in using the licenses and collateral, based on the AT&T projections, using that collateral to take out loans and buy more licenses, and eventually buying billions of dollars of spectrum. In 1987 he sold the cable business for $755 million and used this new capital to buy even more cellular licenses.

It was around this time that the first wave of analog cellular telephones were starting to enter the consumer consciousness. The Baby Bells started the process of buying their own licenses, only to find that McCaw owned enough of most of the major markets to lock them out unless they purchased spare licenses from him, at a huge profit. His network of licenses in the major markets was used as a lever to buy, sell or trade licenses in other markets that were not considered profitable, at a considerable discount. In 1986 the company purchased MCI's wireless operations, cellular and paging, for $122 million, and changed their name to "McCaw Cellular Communications". In 1989 the company outbid BellSouth for control of LIN Broadcasting, which owned licenses in Houston, Dallas, Los Angeles, and New York, paying $3.5 billion, a price that represented $350 per license.

=== Cellular One ===
At this point McCaw's focus turned from dealing licenses to servicing the network, signing up customers in what was now a maturing technology on the cusp of explosive growth. In order to handle the customer side of the business, McCaw turned to AT&T for technology.

In 1990, McCaw Cellular introduced SS7 signaling across their network. Prior to this, each cell tower in the network connected to local signaling, billing, and sets of land-lines. Since only the towers in the area local to the customer's home had access to dialing and routing information, when they traveled to another area calls could not reach them. With the introduction of SS7 signaling, the dialing and routing information could now be switched across the entire network (known technically as Non-Facility Associated Signalling), tying it together into a single national network. They called the new system "Cellular One", and introduced the concept of roaming charges. That year, McCaw earned $54 million, making him America's highest-paid chief executive.

The partnership grew in November 1992, when AT&T purchased 1/3 of the company for $3.8 billion. At the time, the company was generating $1.75 billion in annual revenue, and had two million Cellular One subscribers - far more customers than AT&T's earlier projections for all cellular use in the US, at a point almost ten years earlier.

=== Purchase by AT&T Corporation ===
In 1994 the merger of the two companies was completed when AT&T purchased the rest of McCaw Cellular for $11.5 billion, at that time the second largest merger in US history, second only to the RJR Nabisco takeover documented in Barbarians at the Gate. The merger was completed in late 1994, creating AT&T Wireless Group, which was at that time the largest cellular carrier in the US. AT&T kick-started their cellular division with 2 million subscribers. As a result of the merger, Craig McCaw became one of AT&T's largest shareholders, but he refused to sit on the Board of Directors because he couldn't stand long meetings. McCaw left daily operations to focus on Teledesic, passing control of AT&T Wireless to James Barksdale, and then Steve Hooper when Barksdale left for Netscape.

Hooper, a long time McCaw Cellular executive, was tapped by AT&T to be the CEO of the newly acquired division. Under his direction, AT&T Wireless grew to be the nation's largest cellular provider by the end of 1997, at which point Hooper and many of the remaining McCaw era executives departed. By 1999 and 2000 the cellular industry began to consolidate and Verizon Wireless and Cingular Wireless became the first and second-largest national carriers.

The year 1999 also brought John D. Zeglis as chief executive in October, followed a few months later by Dan Hesse's departure, who had been head of the division since 1997. Over the next year and a half, all six McCaw regional presidents left the declining company.

=== Spinoff ===
In April 2000, AT&T Wireless became a separately traded entity with the world's largest initial public offering at that time. Just over a year later in July 2001, AT&T Wireless became a separate company rather than a division of AT&T Corporation

In 2003, AT&T Wireless was granted several mobile licenses for Caribbean countries including Barbados, Grenada, Saint Lucia, and Saint Vincent and the Grenadines. AT&T Wireless's decline climaxed in 2003 with the FCC mandating the allowance of porting numbers to other carriers. AT&T Wireless experienced a mass exodus of many customers who were fed up with years of degrading service and poor coverage. By the end of 2003, AT&T Wireless faced a public relations nightmare when a new system for adding subscribers and porting numbers in/out was implemented and botched. Realizing that it faced an impossible situation, AT&T Wireless Services, Inc began accepting bids in early 2004 to be acquired.

As of January 1, 2004, the largest single shareholder of AT&T Wireless was Japan's NTT DoCoMo, which was one of the first to place a bid to buy the company.

In the middle of 2004 much of the Caribbean operations and Bermuda were agreed to be sold to Digicel Group.

=== Acquisition by Cingular ===
On February 13, 2004, AT&T Wireless accepted bids for the acquisition of the wireless company. The two top bidders were British carrier Vodafone and American competitor Cingular. Cingular was owned by two Baby Bells; 40% by BellSouth and 60% by SBC Communications. Vodafone owned 45% of Verizon Wireless and had it succeeded in the bid, their share of Verizon Wireless would then have been sold to parent company Verizon Communications. Cingular emerged victorious February 17 by agreeing to pay more than $41 billion, more than twice the company's recent trading value, to acquire AT&T Wireless. Some analysts have said that although Vodafone, the world's largest mobile operator, was unsuccessful in acquiring the company, it was nonetheless successful in forcing a competitor to overpay for the acquisition of AT&T Wireless.

The sale received US government approval and closed on October 26. Companies that originally comprised Cingular from its inception, such as BellSouth Mobility, were absorbed into the AT&T Wireless Services corporate structure. The AT&T Wireless brand was retired by Cingular on April 26, 2005, six months after the close of the merger. This was per a pre-spinoff agreement with AT&T Corp. that stated that if AT&T Wireless was to be bought by a competitor, the rights to the name AT&T Wireless and the use of the AT&T name in wireless phone service would revert to AT&T Corp.

AT&T Wireless's prepaid services, Go Phone, was adopted by Cingular Wireless after the merger closed, and was used by the current AT&T Mobility until it was rebranded as AT&T PREPAID in 2017.

== Partnerships ==
Rogers AT&T Wireless was a publicly traded partnership between Rogers and AT&T. It operated a mobile network in Canada until Rogers bought out AT&T's stake in 2004 and took the company private. See Rogers Wireless.

SunCom Wireless was a brand name used by three separate companies: Telecorp PCS, Tritel PCS, and Triton PCS (based in Arlington, VA, Jackson, MS, and Berwyn, PA, respectively). All three used the same SunCom logo, but operated as completely independent companies, though all were affiliates of AT&T Wireless, which owned 23% of each company. Telecorp operated primarily in Wisconsin, Iowa, Louisiana, Tennessee, Arkansas, and Puerto Rico. Tritel operated primarily in Mississippi, Kentucky, Alabama, and Tennessee. Triton operated primarily in North and South Carolina and Virginia. In 2002, Telecorp and Tritel completed a merger, while Triton remained independent. In 2003, AT&T Wireless acquired Telecorp/Tritel and in 2004, closed the Telecorp headquarters in Arlington, VA.

Cincinnati Bell Wireless started as a joint venture between Cincinnati Bell and AT&T Wireless, in which AT&T Wireless owned 20%. When AT&T Wireless was purchased by Cingular, control of the 20% passed to Cingular as well. On February 17, 2006, Cincinnati Bell took full control of Cincinnati Bell Wireless by purchasing Cingular's 20% ownership for $80 million.

== AT&T brand returns to wireless ==
The AT&T brand in wireless ended in 2004, but it would be brought back a few years later. On November 18, 2005, SBC Communications completed a merger with AT&T Corp., and took on the name AT&T and created a new modern globe logo. After the merger, rumors surfaced of a revival of AT&T's brand in wireless via a rebranding of Cingular; however, Cingular, Bellsouth, and the new AT&T maintained that the Cingular brand would remain for the time being.

Then, the new AT&T announced on March 5, 2006, that it would be acquiring BellSouth's telephone operations and its stake in Cingular Wireless. On December 29, 2006, the FCC gave its final approval to the AT&T and BellSouth merger. With both parent companies merged into one, Cingular Wireless officially became AT&T Mobility in 2007. The rebranding phase was a gradual process but by mid-2007, the Cingular Wireless brand (not the company) was officially discontinued for the AT&T name.

Thus, AT&T remains as a wireless brand is alive and well; however, the old AT&T Wireless Services company remains defunct. Today, AT&T stores sell all AT&T products and services: Wireless, Landline, Internet, U-Verse, DIRECTV, and more. AT&T currently markets all its services under one brand, even though the wireless division is commonly referred to as "AT&T Mobility" both internally and externally.

== Bibliography ==
- "AT&T Wireless Services", FundingUniverse
- "Craig McCaw Biography, Pioneer of Telecommunications", Academy of Achievement

=== Further reading ===
- O. Casey Corr, "Money from Thin Air", Crown Business, 2000, ISBN 0-8129-2697-8
- Rudnitsky, Howard, 'Great Expectation,' Forbes, April 18, 1988.
- Keller, John J., 'Craig McCaw Goes Establishment,' Business Week, February 6, 1989.
- Fisher, Lawrence M., 'McCaw Risks Debt for Dominance,' New York Times, July 6, 1989.
- Fabrikant, Geraldine, 'Craig McCaw's High-Risk Phone Bet,' New York Times, May 6, 1990.
- Hof, Robert D., 'Step One for Craig McCaw's National Cellular Network,' Business Week, October 22, 1990.
