= BellSouth Mobility =

BellSouth Mobility, LLC
- Type: private
- Industry: Wireless Services
- Predecessor: Advanced Mobile Phone Service
- Founded: 1983
- Defunct: 2004
- Successor: New Cingular Wireless PCS
- Headquarters: Atlanta, Georgia, USA
- Products: GPRS, GSM, TDMA, AMPS, Two way messaging
- Parent: BellSouth (1983-2000); Cingular (2000-2004)
- Website: www.bellsouth.com/wireless

BellSouth Mobility, LLC headquartered in Atlanta, Georgia, was a BellSouth subsidiary.

BellSouth Mobility operates wireless networks using many different wireless communication standards. The most widely used of these technologies is called Digital AMPS, or D-AMPS. Data services were provided by BellSouth Wireless Data, and used the pre-2.5G Mobitex standard.

== History ==
BellSouth Mobility logo, 1984

BellSouth Mobility was a mobile phone network operated by the American landline telephone company BellSouth. It was founded in 1984 during the breakup of AT&T, which included dividing Advanced Mobile Phone Service, Inc. among the Baby Bells. It ran AMPS and D-AMPS across most of the territory covered by the BellSouth landline company. In 2000, it became part of the Cingular Wireless network, and the BellSouth branding was dropped; however, the company continued to exist as an operating subsidiary.

BellSouth Mobility logo, until 2000

In 2004, following Cingular's acquisition of AT&T Wireless Services, BellSouth Mobility ceased to exist when it was legally merged into New Cingular Wireless PCS, LLC, the renamed former operating subsidiary of AT&T Wireless Services.

== Facts ==
- BellSouth Mobility used D-AMPS as opposed to Sprint and Verizon's IS-95 technology. Despite this, BellSouth Mobility offered Sprint and Verizon customers roaming onto their older AMPS network.
