= Digital AMPS =

2G mobile-phone standard that uses time-division multiple access

Digital AMPS (D-AMPS = Digital Advanced Mobile Phone System), most often referred to as TDMA, is a second-generation (2G) cellular phone system that was once prevalent throughout the Americas, particularly in the United States and Canada since the first commercial network was deployed in 1993. Former large D-AMPS networks included those of AT&T and Rogers Wireless. The name TDMA is based on the abbreviation for time-division multiple access, a common multiple access technique which is used in most 2G standards, including GSM. D-AMPS competed against GSM and systems based on code-division multiple access (CDMA). It is now considered end-of-life, as existing networks have shut and been replaced by GSM/GPRS or CDMA2000 technologies. The last carrier to operate a D-AMPS network was U.S. Cellular, who terminated it on February 10, 2009.

The technical names for D-AMPS are IS-54 and its successor IS-136. IS-54 was the first mobile communication system which had provision for security, and the first to employ time-division multiple access (TDMA) technology. IS-136 added a number of features to the original IS-54 specification, including text messaging (SMS), circuit switched data (CSD), and an improved compression protocol. SMS and CSD were both available as part of the GSM protocol, and IS-136 implemented them in a nearly identical fashion.

D-AMPS was a further development of the North American 1G mobile system Advanced Mobile Phone System (AMPS) and used existing AMPS channels and allows for smooth transition between digital and analog systems in the same area. Capacity was increased over the preceding analog design by dividing each 30 kHz channel pair into three time slots (hence time division) and digitally compressing the voice data, yielding three times the call capacity in a single cell. A digital system also made calls more secure in the beginning, as analogue scanners could not access digital signals. Calls were encrypted, using CMEA, which was later found to be weak.

== History ==
The evolution of mobile communication began in three different geographic regions: North America, Europe and Japan. The standards used in these regions were quite independent of each other.

The earliest mobile or wireless technologies implemented were wholly analogue, and are collectively known as 1st Generation (1G) technologies. In Japan, the 1G standards were: Nippon Telegraph and Telephone (NTT) and the high capacity version of it (Hicap). The early systems used throughout Europe were not compatible to each other, meaning the later idea of a common 'European Union' viewpoint/technological standard was absent at this time.

The various 1G standards in use in Europe included C-Netz (in Germany and Austria), Comviq (in Sweden), Nordic Mobile Telephones/450 (NMT450) and NMT900 (both in Nordic countries), NMT-F (French version of NMT900), TMA-450 (Spanish version of NMT450), Radiocom 2000 (RC2000) (in France), TACS (Total Access Communication System) (in the United Kingdom, Italy and Ireland), and TMA-900 (Spanish version of TACS). North American standards were Advanced Mobile Phone System (AMPS) and Narrow-band AMPS (N-AMPS).

Despite the Nordic countries' cooperation, European engineering efforts were divided among the various standards, and the Japanese standards did not get much attention. Developed by Bell Labs in the 1970s and first used commercially in the United States in 1983, AMPS operates in the 800 MHz band in the United States and is the most widely distributed analog cellular standard. (The 1900 MHz PCS band, established in 1994, is for digital operation only.) The success of AMPS kick-started the mobile age in North America.

The market showed an increasing demand because it had higher capacity and mobility than the then-existing mobile communication standards were capable of handling. For example, the Bell Labs system in the 1970s could carry only 12 calls at a time throughout all of New York City. AMPS used Frequency Division Multiple Access (FDMA) which enabled each cell site to transmit on different frequencies, allowing many cell sites to be built near each other.

AMPS also had many disadvantages, as well. Primarily, it did not have the ability to support the ever-increasing demand for mobile communication usage. Each cell site did not have much capacity for carrying higher numbers of calls. AMPS also had a poor security system which allowed people to steal a phone's serial code to use for making illegal calls. All of these triggered the search for a more capable system.

The quest resulted in IS-54, the first American 2G standard. In March 1990, the North American cellular network incorporated the IS-54B standard, the first North American dual mode digital cellular standard. This standard won over Motorola's Narrowband AMPS or N-AMPS, an analog scheme which increased capacity, by cutting down voice channels from 30 kHz to 10 kHz. IS-54, on the other hand, increased capacity by digital means using TDMA protocols. This method separates calls by time, placing parts of individual conversations on the same frequency, one after the next. TDMA tripled call capacity.

Using IS-54, a cellular carrier could convert any of its system's analog voice channels to digital. A dual mode phone uses digital channels where available, and defaults to regular AMPS where they are not. IS-54 was backward compatible with analogue cellular and indeed co-existed on the same radio channels as AMPS. No analogue customers were left behind; they simply could not access IS-54's new features. IS-54 also supported authentication, a help in preventing fraud.

== Technology specifications ==
IS-54 employs the same 30 kHz channel spacing and frequency bands (824-849 and 869-894 MHz) as AMPS. Capacity was increased over the preceding analog design by dividing each 30 kHz channel pair into three time slots and digitally compressing the voice data, yielding three times the call capacity in a single cell. A digital system also made calls more secure because analog scanners could not access digital signals.

The IS-54 standard specifies 84 control channels, 42 of which are shared with AMPS. To maintain compatibility with the existing AMPS cellular telephone system, the primary forward and reverse control channels in IS-54 cellular systems use the same signaling techniques and modulation scheme (binary FSK) as AMPS. An AMPS/IS-54 infrastructure can support use of either analog AMPS phones or D-AMPS phones.

The access method used for IS-54 is Time Division Multiple Access (TDMA), which was the first U.S. digital standard to be developed. It was adopted by the TIA in 1992. TDMA subdivides each of the 30 kHz AMPS channels into three full-rate TDMA channels, each of which is capable of supporting a single voice call. Later, each of these full-rate channels was further sub-divided into two half-rate channels, each of which, with the necessary coding and compression, could also support a voice call. Thus, TDMA could provide three to six times the capacity of AMPS traffic channels. TDMA was initially defined by the IS-54 standard and is now specified in the IS-13x series of specifications of the EIA/TIA.

The channel transmission bit rate for digitally modulating the carrier is 48.6 kbit/s. Each frame has six time slots of 6.67-ms duration. Each time slot carries 324 bits of information, of which 260 bits are for the 13-kbit/s full-rate traffic data. The other 64 bits are overhead; 28 of these are for synchronization, and they contain a specific bit sequence known by all receivers to establish frame alignment. Also, as with GSM, the known sequence acts as a training pattern to initialize an adaptive equalizer.

The IS-54 system has different synchronization sequences for each of the six time slots making up the frame, thereby allowing each receiver to synchronize to its own preassigned time slots. An additional 12 bits in every time slot are for the SACCH (i.e. system control information). The digital verification color code (DVCC) is the equivalent of the supervisory audio tone used in the AMPS system. There are 256 different 8-bit color codes, which are protected by a (12, 8, 3) Hamming code. Each base station has its own preassigned color code, so any incoming interfering signals from distant cells can be ignored.

The modulation scheme for IS-54 is 7C/4 differential quaternary phase shift keying (DQPSK), otherwise known as differential 7t/4 4-PSK or π/4 DQPSK. This technique allows a bit rate of 48.6 kbit/s with 30 kHz channel spacing, to give a bandwidth efficiency of 1.62 bit/s/Hz. This value is 20% better than GSM. The major disadvantage with this type of linear modulation method is the power inefficiency, which translates into a heavier hand-held portable and, even more inconvenient, a shorter time between battery recharges.

== Call processing ==
A conversation's data bits makes up the DATA field. Six slots make up a complete IS-54 frame. DATA in slots 1 and 4, 2 and 5, and 3 and 6 make up a voice circuit. DVCC stands for digital verification color code, arcane terminology for a unique 8-bit code value assigned to each cell. G means guard time, the period between each time slot. RSVD stands for reserved. SYNC represents synchronization, a critical TDMA data field. Each slot in every frame must be synchronized against all others and a master clock for everything to work.

Time slots for the mobile-to-base direction are constructed differently from the base-to-mobile direction. They essentially carry the same information but are arranged differently. Notice that the mobile-to-base direction has a 6-bit ramp time to enable its transmitter time to get up to full power, and a 6-bit guard band during which nothing is transmitted. These 12 extra bits in the base-to-mobile direction are reserved for future use.

Once a call comes in the mobile switches to a different pair of frequencies; a voice radio channel which the system carrier has made analog or digital. This pair carries the call. If an IS-54 signal is detected it gets assigned a digital traffic channel if one is available. The fast associated channel or FACCH performs handoffs during the call, with no need for the mobile to go back to the control channel. In case of high noise, FACCH embedded within the digital traffic channel overrides the voice payload, degrading speech quality to convey control information. The purpose is to maintain connectivity. The slow associated control channel or SACCH does not perform handoffs but conveys things like signal strength information to the base station.

The IS-54 speech coder uses the technique called vector sum excited linear prediction (VSELP) coding. This is a special type of speech coder within a large class known as code-excited linear prediction (CELP) coders. The speech coding rate of 7.95 kbit/s achieves a reconstructed speech quality similar to that of the analog AMPS system using frequency modulation. The 7.95-kbit/s signal is then passed through a channel coder that loads the bit rate up to 13 kbit/s. The new half-rate coding standard reduces the overall bit rate for each call to 6.5 kbit/s, and should provide comparable quality to the 13-kbit/s rate. This half-rate gives a channel capacity six times that of analog AMPS.

== System example ==
The discussion of a communication system will not be complete without the explanation of a system example. A dual-mode cellular phone as specified by the IS-54 standard is explained. A dual-mode phone is capable of operating in an analog-only cell or a dual-mode cell. Both the transmitter and the receiver support both analog FM and digital time-division multiple access (TDMA) schemes. Digital transmission is preferred, so when a cellular system has digital capability, the mobile unit is assigned a digital channel first. If no digital channels are available, the cellular system will assign an analog channel. The transmitter converts the audio signal to a radio frequency (RF), and the receiver converts an RF signal to an audio signal. The antenna focuses and converts RF energy for reception and transmission into free space. The control panel serves as an input/output mechanism for the end user; it supports a keypad, a display, a microphone, and a speaker. The coordinator synchronizes the transmission and receives functions of the mobile unit. A dual-mode cellular phone consists of the following:

- Transmitter
- Antenna assembly
- Receiver
- Control panel
- Coordinator

== Successor technologies ==
By 1993 American cellular was again running out of capacity, despite a wide movement to IS-54. The American cellular business continued booming. Subscribers grew from one and a half million customers in 1988 to more than thirteen million subscribers in 1993. Room existed for other technologies to cater to the growing market. The technologies that followed IS-54 stuck to the digital backbone laid down by it.

=== IS-136 ===
A pragmatic effort was launched to improve IS-54 that eventually added an extra channel to the IS-54 hybrid design. Unlike IS-54, IS-136 utilizes time-division multiplexing for both voice and control channel transmissions. Digital control channel allows residential and in-building coverage, dramatically increased battery standby time, several messaging applications, over the air activation and expanded data applications. IS-136 systems needed to support millions of AMPS phones, most of which were designed and manufactured before IS-54 and IS-136 were considered. IS-136 added a number of features to the original IS-54 specification, including text messaging, circuit switched data (CSD), and an improved compression protocol. IS-136 TDMA traffic channels use π/4-DQPSK modulation at a 24.3-kilobaud channel rate and gives an effective 48.6 kbit/s data rate across the six time slots comprising one frame in the 30 kHz channel.

== Sunset for D-AMPS in the US and Canada ==
AT&T Mobility, the largest US carrier to support D-AMPS (which it refers to as "TDMA"), had turned down its existing network in order to release the spectrum to its GSM and UMTS platforms in 19 wireless markets, which started on May 30, 2007, with other areas that followed in June and July. The TDMA network in these markets operated on the 1900 MHz frequency and did not coexist with an AMPS network. Service on the remaining 850 MHz TDMA markets was discontinued along with AMPS service on February 18, 2008, except in areas where service was provided by Dobson Communications. The Dobson TDMA and AMPS network was shut down March 1, 2008.

Rogers Wireless in Canada removed all 1900 MHz IS-136 in 2003, and has done the same with its 800 MHz spectrum as the equipment failed. On May 31, 2007, Rogers Wireless decommissioned its D-AMPS (along with AMPS) networks and moved the remaining customers on these older networks onto its GSM network.

Alltel, who primarily used CDMA2000 technology but acquired a TDMA network from Western Wireless, shut down its TDMA and AMPS networks in September 2008. US Cellular, which by then also primarily used CDMA2000 technology, shut down its TDMA network on February 10, 2009, the last in the United States.
