= AT&T Mobility =

American telecommunications company

AT&T Mobility LLC

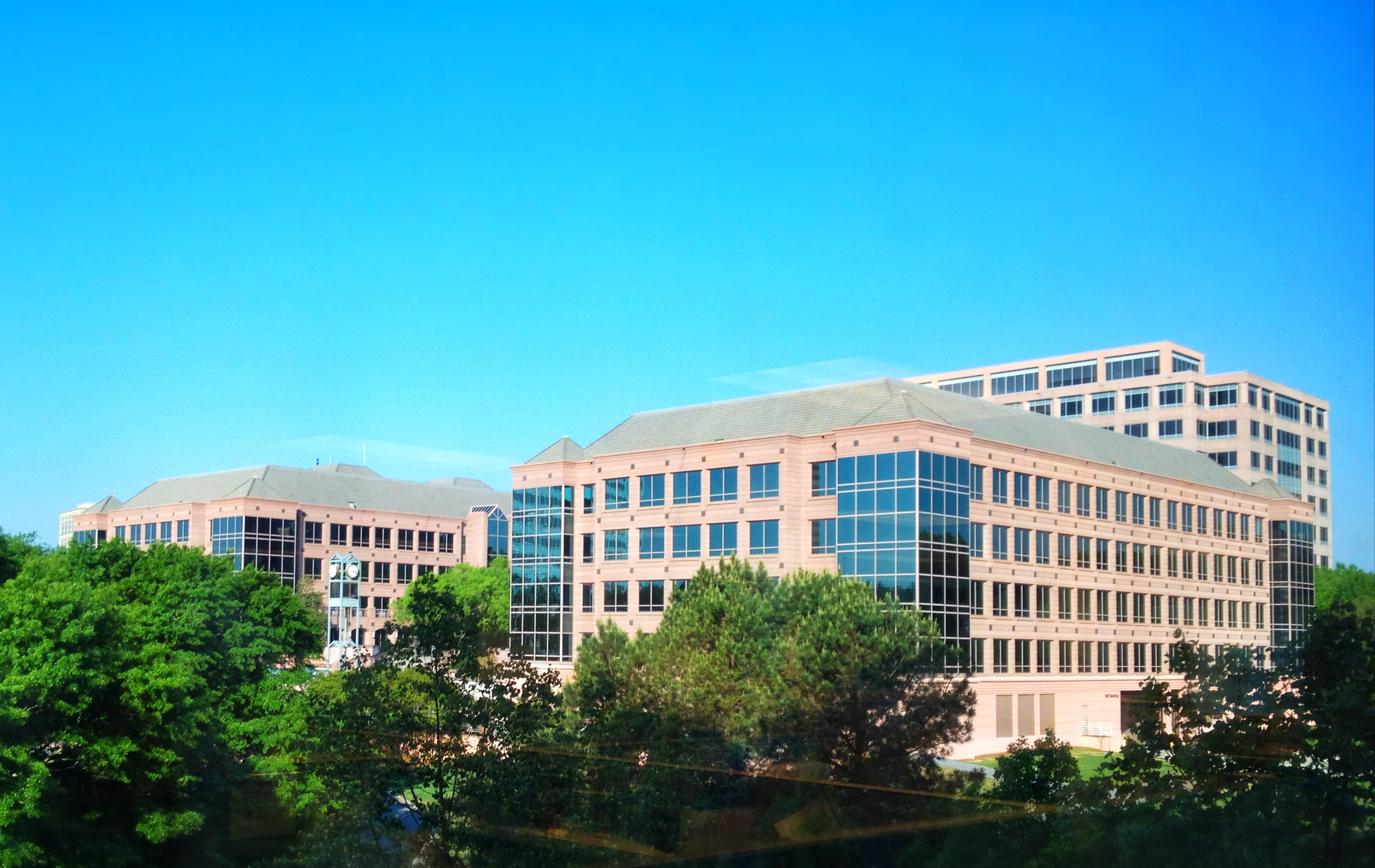
- AT&T Mobility headquarters in the Lenox Park district of Brookhaven, Georgia, adjacent to Atlanta
- Formerly: Cingular Wireless, LLC (2000–2007)
- Type: Subsidiary
- Industry: Telecommunications
- Predecessors: SBC Wireless; BellSouth Mobility; AT&T Wireless Services
- Founded: October 5, 2000; 26 years ago (as Cingular Wireless); January 2007; 19 years ago (as AT&T Mobility)
- Headquarters: Lenox Park, Brookhaven, Georgia, United States
- Number of locations: 5,000 retail stores; 2,300 owned 1,500 authorized 1,950 Prime Communications
- Area served: United States; Puerto Rico & U.S. Virgin Islands (FirstNet only)
- Key people: David Christopher (president)
- Products: Mobile telephony Wireless broadband
- Number of employees: 75,000 (2015)
- Parent: AT&T Communications
- Divisions: Cricket Wireless; FirstNet by AT&T
- Website: www.att.com/wireless/

AT&T Mobility, LLC, also known as AT&T Wireless and marketed as simply AT&T, is an American telecommunications company. Formed on October 5, 2000 as Cingular Wireless LLC, it is a wholly owned subsidiary of AT&T Inc. and provides wireless services in the United States. AT&T Mobility is the third largest wireless carrier in the United States, with 110.2 million subscribers as of September 30, 2026. (Note: AT&T no longer reports wholesale subscribers as of Q1 2026.)

The company is headquartered in Brookhaven, Georgia. Originally known as Cingular Wireless (a joint venture between SBC Communications and BellSouth) from 2000 to 2007, the company acquired the old AT&T Wireless in 2004; SBC later acquired the original AT&T and adopted its name. Cingular became wholly owned by AT&T in December 2006 as a result of AT&T's acquisition of BellSouth.

In January 2007, Cingular confirmed it would rebrand itself under the AT&T name. Although the legal corporate name change occurred immediately, for both regulatory and brand-awareness reasons both brands were used in the company's signage and advertising during a transition period. The transition concluded in late June, just prior to the rollout of the Apple iPhone.

On March 20, 2011, AT&T Mobility announced its intention to acquire T-Mobile US from Deutsche Telekom for $39 billion. If it had received government and regulatory approval, AT&T would have had more than 130 million subscribers. However, the U.S. Department of Justice, the Federal Communications Commission (FCC), and AT&T Mobility's competitors (such as Sprint Corporation) opposed the move on the grounds that it would substantially reduce competition in the cellular network market. In December 2011, in the face of both governmental and widespread consumer opposition, AT&T withdrew its offer to complete the merger.

== Services ==
AT&T offers three tiers of its Unlimited Your Way plan, AT&T Unlimited Premium PL, AT&T Unlimited Extra EL, and AT&T Unlimited Starter SL. Customers can also choose from either the AT&T Value Plus VL, or AT&T 4 GB plans. All plans come with unlimited talk and text, with unlimited data on all except the AT&T 4 GB plan. The higher tier plans include premium data that offers superior service, up to the allotted limit on each line during a bill cycle, plus other features like Mobile Hotspot and more. The AT&T Unlimited Premium® PL plan also includes unlimited talk, text, and data in 20 Latin American countries including the Dominican Republic, included at no extra charge. As of January 8, 2016, AT&T no longer offers two-year contracts for subsidized smartphones on consumer accounts. Customers who currently have two-year contracts are grandfathered until they upgrade to a new device, in which case they will have to choose from AT&T's NEXT installment plans for smartphones. Unlimited data plans may be throttled based on the terms of the plan.

AT&T also allows existing customers to stay on legacy right plans; however, reserves the right to terminate or require a plan change per its terms of service.

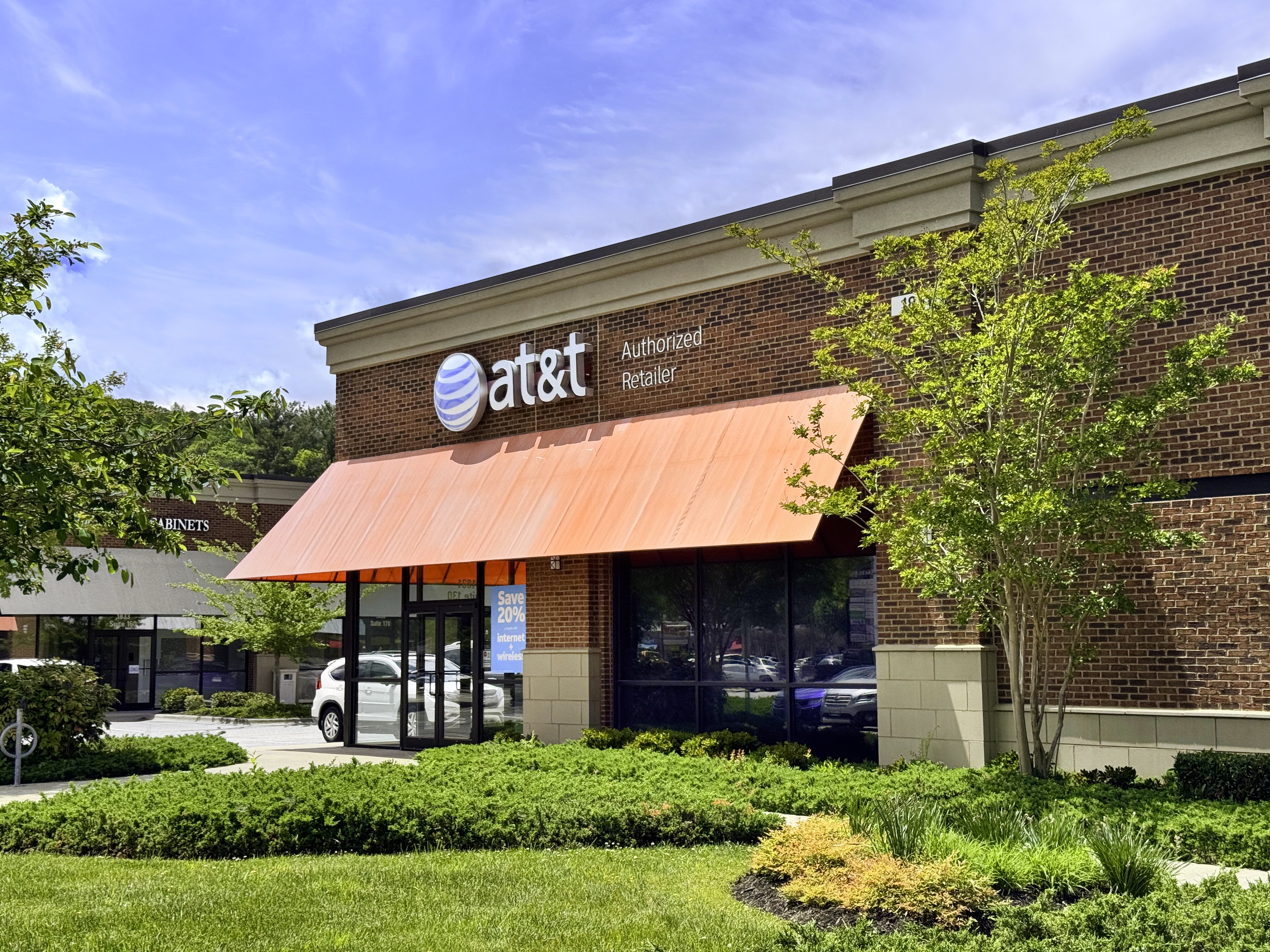
AT&T retail store in Asheville, North Carolina

Within AT&T's 21-state landline footprint, other AT&T services are offered at the AT&T retail stores, including signing up for home phone, internet, and U-verse. AT&T stores outside of its footprint offer wireless services. AT&T also provides free-email services to its customers.

== Employees ==
A large number of AT&T Mobility employees are unionized, belonging to the Communications Workers of America. The CWA represented roughly 15,000 of the previous 20,000 formerly AT&T Wireless employees as of early 2006. As of the end of 2009, the CWA website claims that roughly 40,000 workers of AT&T Mobility are represented by the union.

== History ==
=== Cingular Wireless ===
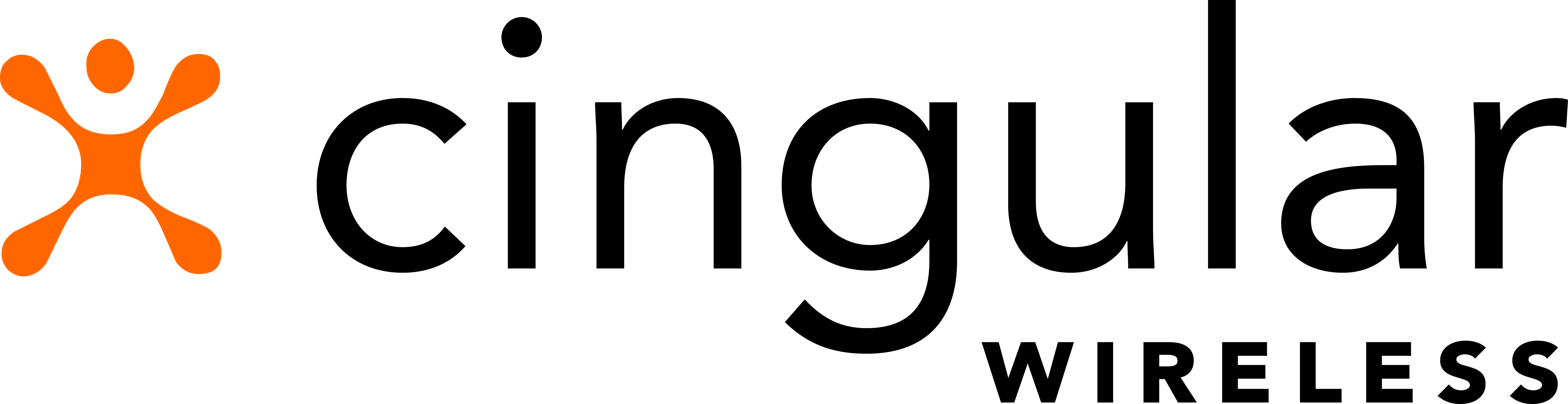
Cingular Wireless logo

Cingular Wireless was a wireless telecommunications company that was founded on October 5, 2000 as a joint venture of SBC Communications and BellSouth. The joint venture created the nation's second-largest carrier. Cingular grew out of a conglomeration of more than 100 companies, including 12 well-known regional companies with Bell roots. The 12 companies included:

- Three companies spun off from Advanced Mobile Phone Service
  - Ameritech Mobile Communications
  - BellSouth Mobility
  - Southwestern Bell Mobile Systems
- BellSouth Mobility DCS
- BellSouth Wireless Data
- CCPR Services d/b/a Cellular One of Puerto Rico and U.S. Virgin Islands
- Pacific Bell Wireless
- Pacific Bell Wireless Northwest
- SBC Wireless
- SNET Mobility
- Southwestern Bell Wireless

SBC Wireless had previously operated in several northeast markets under the "Cellular One" brand, while BellSouth's wireless operations incorporated the former Houston Cellular.

Cingular's lineage can be traced back to Advanced Mobile Phone Service, which was a subsidiary of AT&T created in 1978 to provide cellular service nationwide. AMPS was divided among the Regional Bell Operating Companies as part of the Bell System divestiture.

With the exception of Pacific Bell and BellSouth Mobility DCS, the digital network consisted of D-AMPS technology. The Pacific Bell and BellSouth Mobility DCS networks used GSM technology on the PCS frequency band (1900 MHz).

Around 2004, Cingular had a rollover plan in which un-used minutes carry over and are added to the new balance.

In October 2007, AT&T's president and chief executive officer Stan Sigman announced his retirement. Ralph de la Vega, group president-Regional Telecom & Entertainment, was named as president and CEO of AT&T Mobility.

=== AT&T Wireless merger ===
In February 2004, after a bidding war with Britain's Vodafone Plc (at the time a part-owner of Verizon Wireless), Cingular announced that it would purchase its struggling competitor, AT&T Wireless Services, for $41 billion. This was more than twice the company's trading value.

AT&T Wireless logo, 1987–2005

The merger was completed on October 26, 2004. The combined company had a customer base of 46 million people at the time, making Cingular the largest wireless provider in the United States. AT&T Wireless was then legally renamed New Cingular Wireless Services. Shortly after, new commercials were shown with the "AT&T" transforming into the Cingular logo, and with the Cingular logo's text turned blue to acknowledge the change. Some of the companies that comprised Cingular, such as BellSouth Mobility, ceased to exist when they were legally merged into the operating company subsidiary AT&T Wireless PCS, which was New Cingular Wireless PCS.

First announced on June 22, 2005, Cingular Wireless announced the intention to divest its Caribbean and Bermuda operations and licenses which it acquired from the acquisition of AT&T Wireless, to Irish-owned and Jamaica-based Digicel Group under undisclosed financial terms.

In 2006, one year following the deal, a high-ranking source allegedly close to the sale pointed the Barbados Daily Nation Newspaper towards some SEC filings made by Cingular which were said to establish an idea of the approximate sale price of the deal. According to the SEC filings Cingular was paid around $122 million, with much of that cost going towards the purchase of the former AT&T Wireless assets in Barbados by Digicel.

At the time of the merger, there were two networks: the historic AT&T Blue Network and the Cingular Orange Network. Both networks contained a mix of both TDMA and GSM facilities. Approximately 50,000 cell sites had to be melded together. From a technical standpoint, the "blue" and "orange" networks were considered different networks until integration was completed in 2005. Enhanced Network Selection (ENS) was used to home cellular devices on either the "blue" or "orange" network during this process.

=== The New AT&T ===
AT&T Mobility logo, 2007–2015

On November 21, 2005, Ed Whitacre, then CEO of the newly merged SBC/AT&T, announced plans to market Cingular's service under the AT&T brand. BellSouth spokesman Jeff Battcher countered that the terms of the joint venture allow either party to sell the service under another name, and that he believes they will be using the brand to market to business customers. Cingular president Stan Sigman concurred with BellSouth's position, indicating that the Cingular brand would continue but be sold under the AT&T brand where offered in packages with other AT&T services, such as data and wireline telephony.

However, AT&T announced on March 5, 2006, that AT&T would merge with BellSouth. The acquisition was finalized on December 29, 2006, when the FCC gave its final approval. The following month, AT&T announced that it would phase out the Cingular brand across all of its services and replace it with AT&T, with an accompanying advertising campaign branding the combined company as "The New AT&T." Commercials featured the orange Cingular "Jack" logo encircling the AT&T globe logo several times, dragging its blue bars behind it to form the globe's blue stripes, before finally disappearing behind it, being backed by the chorus of the Oasis song "All Around the World". AT&T added the color orange to its signage to reflect the change; AT&T would eventually remove orange in 2015 following another rebranding related to its acquisition of DirecTV.

In November 2007, AT&T merged with Dobson Communications, who owned Cellular One and was a roaming partner of AT&T, for $2.8 billion. The sale added 1.7 million subscribers and expanded AT&T coverage in various suburban and rural markets (including Alaska). On November 7, 2008, AT&T announced its intent to acquire Centennial Wireless for $944 million, expanding its coverage in the Midwest, southern U.S., and Puerto Rico.

=== Failed acquisition of T-Mobile USA ===
On March 20, 2011, AT&T and Deutsche Telekom announced that AT&T had agreed to acquire T-Mobile USA from Deutsche Telekom in a deal estimated to be worth $39 billion in cash and stock. AT&T said the deal was expected to close in 12 months and was subject to regulatory approval. As of June 2011, it was being examined by the FCC. On August 31, 2011, the United States Department of Justice formally announced that it had filed a lawsuit to block the merger. On November 22, 2011, FCC Chairman Julius Genachowski recommended sending AT&T's proposed T-Mobile acquisition to an administrative law judge for review and a hearing. On November 23, 2011, AT&T withdrew its application with the FCC regarding the acquisition of T-Mobile USA. They also indicated that they would recognize a $4 billion accounting charge in the event of a deal collapse. That charge covers a $3 billion cash breakup fee and $1 billion as the market value for the spectrum they were required to transfer to T-Mobile if the deal failed to complete.

=== 2012–present ===
On August 2, 2012, AT&T announced its intent to acquire NextWave Wireless. On January 22, 2013, AT&T announced its intent to acquire the U.S. retail wireless operations of Atlantic Tele-Network, doing business as Alltel, for $780 million. On June 24, 2014, Plateau Wireless announced the sale of assets and operations in eastern New Mexico and west Texas to AT&T, including wireless spectrum and 40,000 customers.

In November 2014 and January 2015, AT&T acquired the Mexican wireless carriers Iusacell and Nextel Mexico to form AT&T Mexico.

On October 9, 2019, Liberty Cablevision of Puerto Rico's parent company (Liberty Latin America), announced the acquisition of AT&T Wireless Services in Puerto Rico and the U.S. Virgin Islands, in a $1.95 billion deal. The sale was completed on November 2, 2020. In May 2021, the company began promoting AT&T and Liberty as a unified brand. In September 2021, Liberty began phasing out the AT&T brand and introduced a new logo.

On February 22, 2024, a massive outage affected customers nationwide.

== Network ==
=== GSM facilities ===
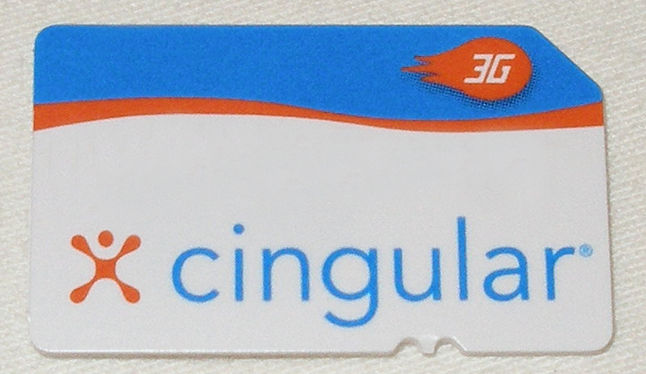
Cingular 3G UMTS SIM card

In California, Nevada, Northern New Jersey and New York City, Cingular and T-Mobile USA maintained and shared a GSM-1900 network prior to the acquisition of AT&T Wireless, through a joint venture known as GSM Facilities. The network sharing agreement allowed Cingular to offer local service in northern New Jersey and New York City and T-Mobile USA to offer service in California and Nevada. On May 25, 2004, Cingular and T-Mobile USA announced their intention to dissolve the agreement contingent on Cingular's successful acquisition of AT&T Wireless, the Cingular network was transferred to T-Mobile USA, with Cingular continuing work on the GSM facilities at AT&T Wireless sites.

=== Fiber network switching facilities ===
AT&T has a global sub-sea Tier-1 fiber network switching facility on St. Croix in the U.S. Virgin Islands, in conjunction with University of the Virgin Islands Research and Technology Park.

=== Radio frequency summary ===
The following is a list of known frequencies that AT&T employs in the United States for 4G LTE and 5G NR networks.

Frequencies used on the AT&T Network
Frequency range	Band number	Protocol	Generation	Status	Notes
700 MHz Lower SMH A/B/C/D/E Blocks, Upper D Block	12/17	LTE/LTE-A/ LTE-A Pro	4G	Active/building out	Bands 12 and 17 are AT&T's main LTE bands for coverage.
700 MHz Lower SMH A/B/C/D/E Blocks, Upper D Block	14	LTE/LTE-A/ LTE-A Pro	4G	Active/building out	Band 14 was acquired from FirstNet. Used for public safety services, although commercial uses are permitted (with lower priority). Spectrum possession covers 100% of the United States.
700 MHz Lower SMH A/B/C/D/E Blocks, Upper D Block	29	LTE/LTE-A/ LTE-A Pro	4G	Active/building out	Band 29 is only for supplemental downlink.
850 MHz CLR	5	LTE/LTE-A/ LTE-A Pro	4G	Active/refarming to NR	Band 5 LTE has been shut down in many markets, and moved entirely to 5G.
1.7/2.1 GHz AWS	4/66	LTE/LTE-A/ LTE-A Pro	4G	Active/refarming to NR	Additional LTE bands for capacity. Bands 2 and 4/66 are used for 5G DSS.
1.9 GHz PCS	2	LTE/LTE-A/ LTE-A Pro	4G	Active/refarming to NR	Additional LTE bands for capacity. Bands 2 and 4/66 are used for 5G DSS.
2.3 GHz WCS	30	LTE/LTE-A/ LTE-A Pro	4G	Active/building out	Additional LTE bands for capacity. Bands 2 and 4/66 are used for 5G DSS.
3.5 GHz CBRS	48	LTE/LTE-A/ LTE-A Pro	4G	Active/building out	Used for coverage in select indoor areas, with additional expansion possible.
5.2 GHz U-NII	46	LTE/LTE-A/ LTE-A Pro	4G	Active/building out	Only for downlink acceleration in key market area.
850 MHz CLR	n5	NR/5G-A	5G	Active/building out	Branded as "5G ". Primary band for 5G NR network for consumers in many markets.
1.7/2.1 GHz AWS	n66	NR/5G-A	5G	Active/building out	Branded as "5G ". Additional 5G capacity in some markets, including via DSS with LTE.
1.9 GHz PCS	n2	NR/5G-A	5G	Active/building out	Branded as "5G ". Provides 5G NR network coverage in some markets. Began deployment in late 2020 via DSS with LTE.
3.45 GHz C-band	n77	NR/5G-A	5G	Active/building out	Branded as "5G+ ". Provides mid-band 5G coverage. Acquired in 2021 auction, with deployment beginning the year after. Spectrum possession covers 100% of the continental United States.
3.7 GHz C-band	n77	NR/5G-A	5G	Active/building out	Branded as "5G+ ". Provides mid-band 5G coverage. Went live on January 19, 2022. Spectrum possession covers 100% of the continental United States.
39 GHz Ka-band	n260	NR/5G-A	5G	Active/building out	Branded as "5G+ ". Provides mmWave 5G coverage for high-speed. Only available in select areas. Went live in December 2018. Spectrum possession covers 100% of the United States.

=== Past networks summary ===
The following chart lists the networks that AT&T previously operated.

Frequency Band	Band number	Protocol	Generation	Status	Notes
850 MHz CLR	N/A	AMPS	1G	Retired	Network was retired on March 1, 2008.
850 MHz CLR	N/A	D-AMPS	2G	Retired	Network was retired on March 1, 2008.
1.9 GHz PCS	N/A	D-AMPS	2G	Retired	Network was retired on July 15, 2007.
850 MHz CLR	5 (GSM-850)	GSM/GPRS/EDGE	2G	Retired	Network was retired on January 1, 2017.
1.9 GHz PCS	2 (PCS-1900)	GSM/GPRS/EDGE	2G	Retired	Network was retired on January 1, 2017.
850 MHz CLR	5 (V)	UMTS/HSPA/HSPA+	3G	Retired	AT&T marketed its HSPA/HSPA+ services as "4G". Network was retired on February 22, 2022.
1.9 GHz PCS	2 (II)	UMTS/HSPA/HSPA+	3G	Retired	AT&T marketed its HSPA/HSPA+ services as "4G". Network was retired on February 22, 2022.

=== Coverage ===
As a result of its formation through mergers and acquisitions, as well as the rapid technological change in the wireless industry, AT&T operates the second-largest digital voice and data network within its United States footprint. AT&T's network footprint supports 4G and uses LTE/LTE-Advanced for simultaneous packet switched voice and data communications. AT&T is also in the process of rolling out its 5G network based on the NR specification.

Cingular, the predecessor to AT&T, supported legacy D-AMPS/TDMA and analog wireless networks. In March 2006, Cingular announced that these networks would be shut down by February 2008. As of March 31, 2007, Cingular ended TDMA supported for GoPhone (pre-paid) customers. On July 15, 2007, AT&T TDMA on 1900 MHz was retired, while TDMA on 850 MHz remained. On February 18, 2008, AT&T Mobility officially ended service on their AMPS and remaining TDMA network, except for in areas previously operated by Dobson Communications; the Dobson AMPS and TDMA network was shut down March 1, 2008. Networks formerly operated by AT&T predecessors including Cingular also include various paging services and the Cingular Interactive division, which became Velocita Wireless. Velocita was later purchased by Sprint Nextel. AT&T also offered Enhanced Push To Talk (PTT) services on smartphones. The original PTT service was sunset.

The AT&T wireless data network began in 2002 as a Cingular initiative called "Project Genesis" that involved a GPRS overlay of the entire wireless network. Project Genesis was completed by the end of 2004. Later, this network was upgraded to EDGE across the GSM footprint.

In 2005, AT&T launched a broadband network known as "BroadbandConnect", based on UMTS and HSDPA, to counter Verizon Wireless and Sprint's EV-DO networks. UMTS service was launched on December 6, 2005, in Seattle, Portland, San Francisco, Salt Lake City, San Jose, San Diego, Las Vegas, Phoenix, Puerto Rico, Austin, Houston, Dallas, Detroit, Chicago, Boston, Baltimore, and Washington, D.C., and expanded to all major metropolitan markets by the end of 2006. As of early 2009, AT&T Mobility has completed its upgrade of the 3G to HSUPA,

In 2011, it was reported that AT&T would upgrade its network to HSPA+ throughout the year, which it would market as offering 4G-grade speeds. On September 18, 2011, AT&T first launched LTE service in 5 U.S. metropolitan areas, with plans for serving 15 markets by the end of the year. AT&T's LTE rollout was noticeably slower than that of its competitor, Verizon Wireless, with the company stating that its then-proposed acquisition of T-Mobile USA would be necessary. In November 2012, AT&T promoted the network as serving 150 million users, with plans to double its coverage by 2014.

On January 1, 2017, AT&T discontinued its 2G GSM network.

In April 2017, AT&T announced that it would upgrade its existing LTE networks in selected markets to support LTE Advanced and LTE Advanced Pro features, marketed as "5G Evolution" (5G E).

In January 2018, AT&T stated that it intended to deploy 5G NR service by the end of the year.

On February 22, 2022, AT&T discontinued its 3G UMTS network

AT&T operates the second-largest 5G network in the U.S. with approximately 30% of the nation covered. AT&T uses low, mid, and high band frequencies. Mid and high band 5G is marketed as 5G+ and offers much faster speeds than low band. Continuous expansion of the 5G network, especially mid-band 5G+, is planned through 2023. AT&T plans to cover 200 million people with 5G+ by the end of 2023.

== Marketing ==
=== "Fewest dropped calls" ===
During the first quarter of 2006, Telephia reported that during an extensive nationwide test of major wireless carriers in 350 metropolitan markets around the country, Cingular dropped the fewest calls across the country. In turn, Cingular began aggressively advertising the "Allover Network", citing Telephia as "the leading independent research company." Telephia's report was in stark contrast to the Consumers Union publication, Consumer Reports, based on a survey of 50,000 of its members in 18 cities, which criticized Cingular for static and dropped calls. Furthermore, J.D. Power and Associates consistently ranked Cingular at or near the bottom of every geographical region in its 2006 Wireless Call Quality Study, which is based on a smaller survey of 23,000 wireless users. This campaign had to come to an abrupt end.

Telephia, which tests wireless networks by making over 6 million calls per year in what it claims is the world's largest wireless network test program, initially refused to provide details on its study, and a spokesman for the company has said, according to the Boston Globe, that "Cingular shouldn't have even mentioned the company's name to a reporter." The research company later stated that Cingular did, indeed, have a "statistically significant lower dropped-call rate than the competition across some market/time period groupings", but that Telephia had "no knowledge of the specific methodology (markets, time periods or statistical thresholds) that Cingular used for its 'lowest dropped call' claim." While AT&T has abandoned its verbal claim of "The Fewest Dropped Calls" in its commercials, it continues to show situations where two persons are speaking with each other on their phones, and one of the users' call drops. AT&T now states "We are still continuing to run ads that emphasize the importance of not dropping calls. That campaign is continuing."

=== iPhone ===
On June 29, 2007, Apple's iPhone was introduced to the United States market, and AT&T was the exclusive carrier for the device within the United States until February 10, 2011, when the iPhone 4 was launched on the Verizon network.

Teething problems with AT&T's billing process emerged soon after the iPhone's release, as early adopters started receiving exceptionally detailed monthly telephone bills with one of the most notable being the 300-page iPhone bill that was featured in an online video by YouTube influencer iJustine.

Apple launched the iPhone 3G with AT&T on July 11, 2008. Although specific AT&T sales numbers are unavailable, Apple announced that over 1 million iPhone 3G devices were sold during the first three days — in contrast, according to Steve Jobs, Apple's CEO, "It took 74 days to sell the first one million original iPhones." In August 2008, Best Buy announced that it would begin selling the iPhone 3G for use on the AT&T network. In September 2008, AT&T announced that it would also sell the iPhone 3G in Puerto Rico and the U.S. Virgin Islands.

The iPhone 4 was released on June 24, 2010. According to Apple, over 1.7 million iPhone 4 units were sold in the first few days, which is the most out of any phone ever sold. These sales propelled AT&T to strong Q2 results.

The iPhone 5 was released on September 12, 2012. Apple reported selling 5 million iPhone 5's in the first weekend. AT&T activated 8.5 million iPhones in Q4 of 2012.

=== Android-based smart phones ===
On February 18, 2010, AT&T announced that on March 7, 2010, it would introduce its first smart phone based on Google's Android operating system, the Motorola Backflip. On March 22, 2010, AT&T announced that its second Android handset would be the Dell Aero, a revised version of the Dell Mini 3. However, the second Android phone AT&T released was the HTC Aria which was announced on June 14, 2010, and released on June 20, 2010. The Samsung Captivate, which is part of the Galaxy S family, was released on AT&T's network on July 18, 2010. In addition to devices released on AT&T were a line of handsets manufactured by Motorola. The Motorola Flipout, followed by the Motorola Flipside and the Motorola Bravo all run Android 2.1 and were all released Q4 2010. Three new 4G Android devices were announced for release within the first and second quarter of the fiscal year 2011, including the Motorola Atrix 4G, the HTC Inspire 4G, and the Samsung Infuse 4G. HTC Inspire 4G being the first, preceded by the Motorola Atrix 4G are, available through AT&T's 4G network. These three devices are all running Android 2.2 (Froyo) and are expected to be upgraded to Android 2.3 Gingerbread later in the year, along with an update to "enable" 4G uploads. Unlike other United States networks with Android-based phones, AT&T did not allow non-market apps to be installed. However, on May 16, 2011, AT&T announced that some current and future Android devices will come with an option to allow the installation of unofficial applications.

=== 4G LTE (long-term evolution) ===
In a BBDO campaign for 4G and 4G LTE started in November 2012, Beck Bennett interviewed children in commercials directed by Jorma Taccone, with the slogan "It's not complicated." The children were asked whether fast or slow is better, or whether two is better than one. Taccone said "The spots are 'guided' improv", meaning the children were allowed to be natural until others had to step in and help.

=== In Need for Speed Games ===
In the NFS games Underground 2 to Carbon, the network (as Cingular) was shown as the mobile internet provider in the ingame voice/text message.

== Current services ==
AT&T reintroduced unlimited plans in 2016; on launch, users were required to subscribe to an AT&T-owned pay television service (DirecTV or U-verse) in order to be eligible. In April 2017, the Unlimited Plus plan was reduced in price, and a complimentary subscription to HBO (either as part of an AT&T-owned pay television service, or standalone via HBO GO) was added to both plans. In June 2018, the two plans were discontinued for new subscribers and replaced by similar "Unlimited & More" plans, which both include AT&T's new "Watch TV" service (which includes a selection of entertainment cable networks) at no charge, and Unlimited & More Premium allowing users to also choose a premium subscription service (such as Cinemax, HBO, Showtime, Spotify, Starz, Amazon Music Unlimited, Pandora Premium, or VRV) as an add-on. The basic Unlimited & More plan is restricted to standard definition video streaming.

=== AT&T Prepaid ===
AT&T Prepaid (stylized AT&T PREPAID; formerly GoPhone) is a prepaid mobile phone service from AT&T Mobility.

The GoPhone name and product were originally conceived and implemented by McCaw Cellular by its founder Craig McCaw and first used in commerce in 1987 by his company. It was later bought by AT&T in 1995 and used by the pre-2004 "AT&T Wireless" after Cingular's purchase of AT&T Wireless in 2004 for $41 billion. At that time, Cingular was jointly owned by SBC Communications (Southwestern Bell Corporation) of San Antonio, Texas, which owned 60 percent, and BellSouth of Atlanta, Georgia.

The original GoPhone service was discontinued and Cingular renamed its prepaid services under GoPhone. The GoPhone brand name was still in use even after "Cingular" renamed itself "AT&T Mobility" until 2017 when it was rebranded AT&T PREPAID.

As of January 2019, AT&T Prepaid has 6 million subscribers.

=== NumberSync ===
NumberSync was introduced in 2015. The service allows AT&T postpaid wireless customers to use one telephone number to send and receive calls and text messages across all of their supported devices.

== Controversies ==
=== Misrepresentation of network technology ===
==== Misrepresentation as 4G (LTE) ====
In 2011, following a similar change by T-Mobile USA, AT&T began marketing both its HSPA and HSPA+ services as "4G", and distributed phone software patches changing their network indicators to identify these services as such. With the ITU having expanded its definition of 4G to include HSPA+, AT&T decided to label 14 Mbit/s HSPA devices and service as HSPA+, and thus 4G. Standard HSPA service, however, never met 4G standards, nor are these HSPA devices (non-Evolved) actually capable of operating at HSPA+ speeds. Media outlets considered this branding to be deceptive. Concerns were also expressed over the possibility of confusion when actual 4G VoLTE networks were to be eventually deployed.

==== Misrepresentation as 5G ====
In 2017, AT&T began to similarly use the trademark 5G Evolution (5G E) to refer to LTE networks upgraded to support higher data speeds via LTE Advanced and LTE Advanced Pro features, such as 4x4 MIMO antennas, 256-QAM, and three-way carrier aggregation. AT&T promotes these networks as having a theoretical top speed of 400 Mbit/s. In late-2018, AT&T distributed phone software patches changing network indicators to refer to these networks as such.

5G Evolution is entirely unrelated to actual 5G wireless standards; AT&T states that these technologies "serve as the runway to 5G by boosting the existing LTE network and priming it for the future of connectivity", and argued that "the customer doesn't need to think about the exact technology – they only care on the performance and what it enables." AT&T marketing likewise promotes this network with the slogan "The First Step to 5G".

AT&T once again faced allegations that the branding was misleading, because it is merely a rebranding of existing 4G networks in order to ride upon consumer anticipation of actual 5G technology. T-Mobile US and Verizon Wireless have deployed similar late-stage upgrades in a larger number of markets than AT&T, but promote them as being upgrades to their 4G LTE service. T-Mobile mocked the branding via a video on Twitter, showing a person applying a sticky note reading "9G" over the LTE indicator on an iPhone, captioned "didn't realize it was this easy, brb updating". Technology website The Verge noted that the South American wireless carrier Claro had been using the branding "4.5G" (stylized to make the 4 slightly smaller than the 5) to promote similar upgrades to its LTE service, but felt that this brand was "not as baldfaced a deception as AT&T's 5G E".

In February 2019, Sprint Corporation sued AT&T Mobility for false advertising, presenting evidence that consumers were being misled into believing these services were of equal or higher performance than actual 5G networks. Sprint sought an injunction to halt AT&T's promotion of the network with this trademark. However, the two parties later settled, with AT&T being allowed to continue to promote their network with the trademark.

In May 2020, following complaints by T-Mobile to the National Advertising Division, the National Advertising Review Board (NARB) recommended that AT&T stop using "5G Evolution" or "The First Step to 5G" in advertising, as "the term 'Evolution' is not likely to alert consumers to the fact that the service is not 5G." AT&T stated that it would not use "5G Evolution" or the slogan in future advertising, but that it will still use the 5G E logo, and not remove the indicator from devices.

=== NASCAR sponsorship conflict ===
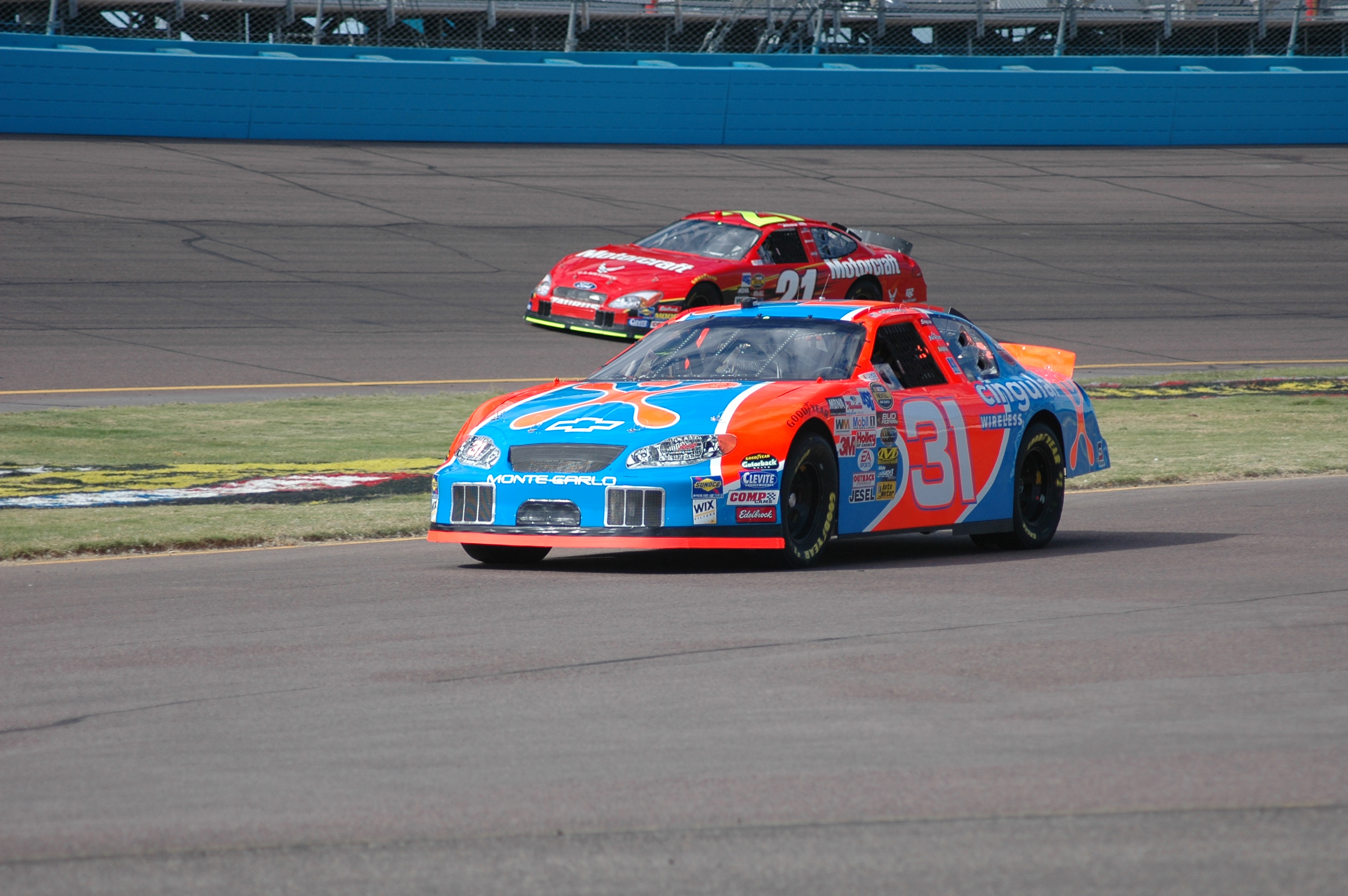
The #31 Cingular car driven by Robby Gordon at Phoenix International Raceway

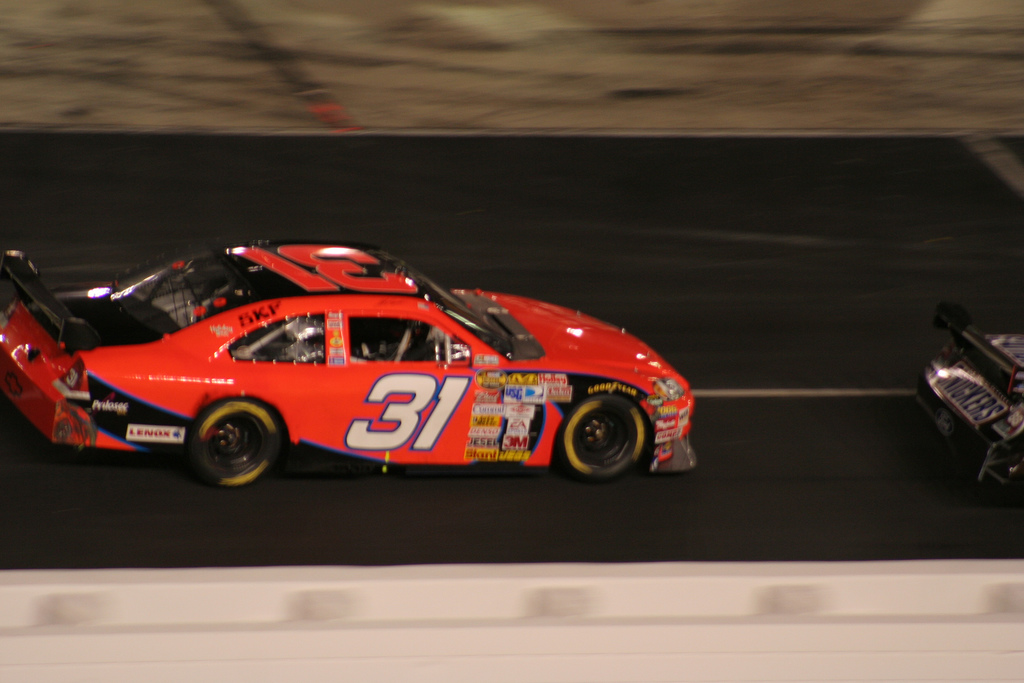
The #31 car driven by Jeff Burton without AT&T sponsorship at Bristol Motor Speedway

Cingular Wireless began its sponsorship of the #31 Chevrolet, owned by Richard Childress Racing, in the NASCAR Winston Cup Series in 2002. Two years later, when Nextel Communications (now Sprint Corporation) purchased the naming rights to NASCAR's top division (rebranding the division as the Nextel Cup Series, and later the Sprint Cup Series), Cingular and Alltel, sponsor of the #12 Dodge (owned by Penske Racing and driven by Ryan Newman), were allowed to stay as sponsors under a grandfather clause. In early 2007, following its purchase by AT&T, Cingular began a re-branding effort to the AT&T Mobility brand. NASCAR quickly claimed that a clause in their contract with Sprint Nextel (the Viceroy rule) would not allow Cingular to change either the name or brand advertised on the #31 car.

After trying and failing to persuade NASCAR to approve the addition of the AT&T globe logo to the rear of the car, AT&T filed a lawsuit against NASCAR on March 16, 2007. On May 18, AT&T won a preliminary injunction in the United States District Court for the Northern District of Georgia in Atlanta and, following a failed emergency motion for a stay by NASCAR on May 19, re-branded the #31 car, driven by Jeff Burton, in time for the Nextel All-Star Challenge that evening. NASCAR was later granted an appeal to be heard on August 2.

On June 17, NASCAR announced it had filed a US$100 million lawsuit against AT&T and would like AT&T and all other rival telecommunications companies out of the sport at the end of 2008.

On August 13, a ruling by the United States Court of Appeals for the Eleventh Circuit cleared the way for NASCAR to prevent AT&T from featuring its logo on the car. The 11th Circuit dismissed a lower court's ruling that prevented NASCAR from stopping AT&T's plans. The appeals court remanded the case to the district court.

At first practice for the Sharpie 500 at Bristol Motor Speedway on August 24, the #31 car was colored orange and black, but was bare; that is, associate sponsors appeared, but no primary sponsors were on the car, similar to Formula One cars run in races where tobacco advertising is prohibited. The pit crew wore grey Richard Childress Racing shirts and Burton had a plain orange fire suit with associate sponsors. The car, which carried a "subliminal advertising" scheme, arrived in a black hauler with only the number 31 on the side. NASCAR officials said the car would not have made it through inspection with the AT&T logos. During that weekend, AT&T claimed that two alternate paint schemes proposed by AT&T — one advertising its "go phone" and another with the old Cingular slogan "more bars in more places" that AT&T recently brought back — were rejected by NASCAR. The Go Phone scheme had been used in the past. NASCAR later denied these claims.

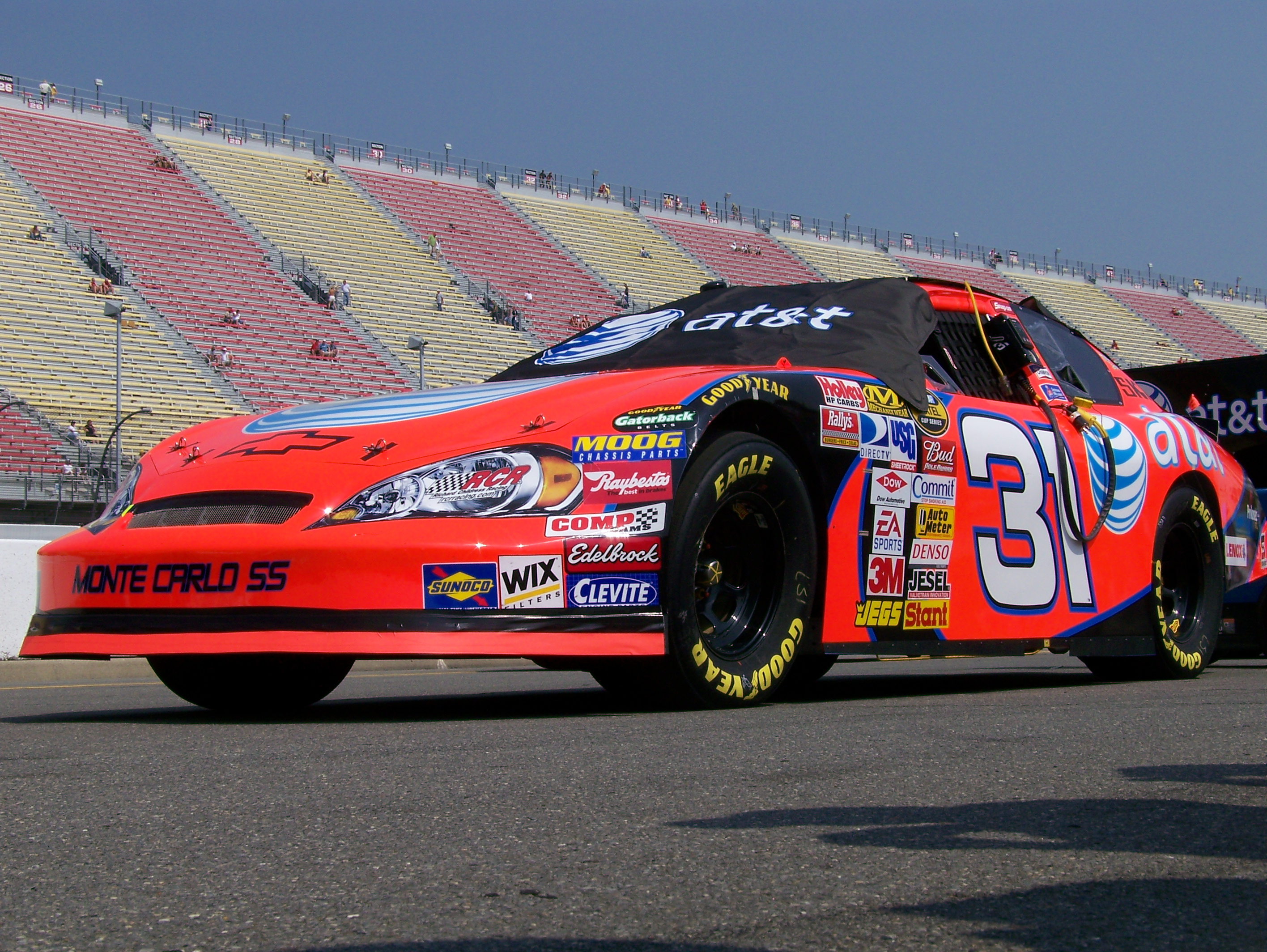
The #31 car driven by Jeff Burton with AT&T sponsorship at Michigan International Speedway in 2007

On September 7, 2007, a settlement was reached where AT&T Mobility could remain on the #31 car until the end of 2008, but the associate sponsorship of the #29 Nationwide Series Holiday Inn Chevrolet driven on a part-time basis by Burton and Scott Wimmer was not affected, because it was in a lower division.

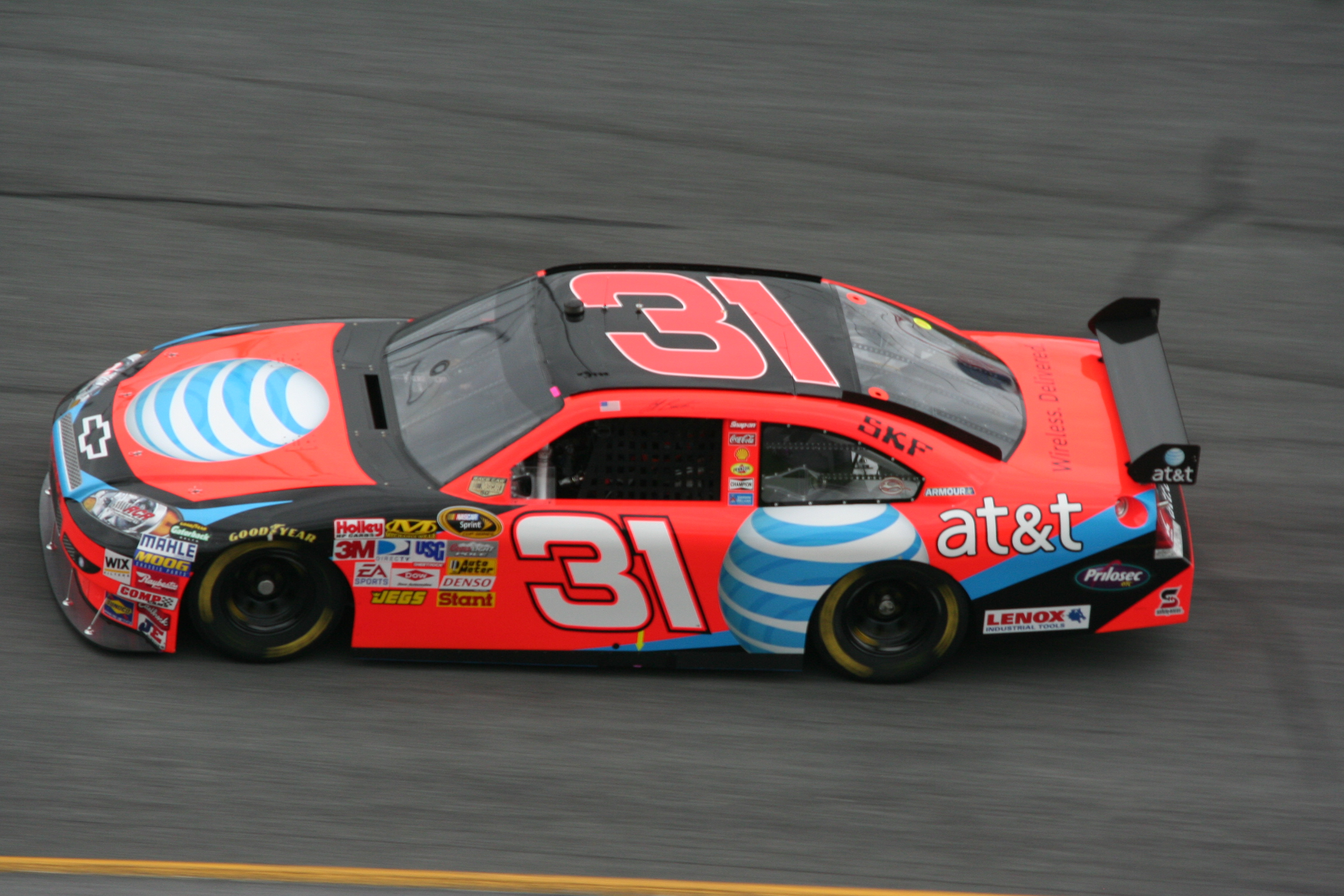
The #31 car driven by Jeff Burton with AT&T sponsorship at Daytona International Speedway in 2008

No division of AT&T have sponsored any organization in NASCAR since, even though the Viceroy rule changed from telecommunications companies to beverages when Monster Energy took over sponsorship of the Cup Series in 2017 before NASCAR removed series title sponsorship in the Cup Series altogether, effectively removing any restrictions on which brands can sponsor teams, pursuant to NASCAR approval. In fact, AT&T's parent division had sued a NASCAR team and driver it sponsored, Mike Borkowski, on performance grounds.

=== Throttling of "unlimited" plans ===
In 2012, AT&T came under scrutiny for throttling the speed of data delivered to consumers with an unlimited data plan. The company has claimed that, despite its claim of network speeds, it is within its legal rights to reduce the speed of data to consumers who reach preset thresholds. In May 2012, Matt Spaccarelli, a truck driver, won a small claims lawsuit against the company for slowing down his service. A Simi Valley, California judge awarded Spaccarelli $850, agreeing that "unlimited" service shouldn't be subject to slowdowns. Additionally, AT&T's user agreement does not permit class-action suits against the company.

In 2014, the FTC sued AT&T for deceptive business practices. In November 2019, AT&T agreed to pay $60 million to settle the suit, which must be distributed as a "partial refund" to customers who signed up for the affected plans prior to 2011. It also agreed to prominently disclose any throttling restrictions it imposes on its wireless plans in the future.

=== Mobility Administrative Fee ===
In May 2013, AT&T added a 61 cent "Mobility Administrative Fee" per-month per-line to all of its wireless postpaid lines, including lines still under service contract. The fee appears "below the line" making it appear like a tax at the bottom of a customer's phone bill. This fee is thought to bring more than a half-billion dollars in a year for AT&T, which claims the fee is for covering the cost of cell sites and maintenance. In June 2018, AT&T raised the administrative fee to $1.99 from 76 cents per-line.

=== Illegal location data sharing ===
In April 2024, AT&T was fined $57 million by the FCC for illegally sharing access to customers' real-time location data. In response, AT&T criticized the FCC's decision, claiming it lacked "both legal and factual merit."

== Other AT&T’s subsidiaries/brands ==
- AT&T Prepaid (formerly AT&T GoPhone)
- Cricket Wireless
- AT&T Mexico
