= Council of Advisors on Digital Economy =

- Beirat Junge Digitale Wirtschaft beim Bundesministerium für Wirtschaft

Agency overview
- Formed: January 2013
- Jurisdiction: Government of Germany, Federal Ministry for Economic Affairs and Energy
- Headquarters: Berlin, Germany
- Minister responsible: Peter Altmaier, Federal Minister for Economic Affairs and Energy

The Council of Advisors on Digital Economy (German: Beirat Junge Digitale Wirtschaft beim Bundesministerium für Wirtschaft, abbreviated BJDW) is an advisory board to the German government established within the Federal Ministry for Economic Affairs and Energy of the Federal Republic of Germany. It was created in 2013 to advise on strategic decisions related to the digital economy and digital transformations. The council meets in non-public sessions and is directly reporting to the federal government: the current minister responsible is Peter Altmaier serving on the cabinet of Federal Chancellor Angela Merkel as her Federal Minister of Economic Affairs and Energy.

== Members ==
The council members, distinguished individuals appointed by the German government, are drawn from industry, research institutions, and NGOs qualified on the basis of achievement, experience, and integrity. The advisory board includes leading representatives of the German digital economy. The members are not paid.

=== List of members ===
The council currently comprises (as of 8/2020) the following 29 individuals.

- Anne Kjær Bathel, ReDI School of Digital Integration gGmb, Co-Founder and CEO
- Lina Behrens, Flying Health, CEO
- Jörg Bienert, Aiso-lab GmbH, Founder and CEO
- Lea-Sophie Cramer, Investor
- Eckart Diepenhorst, Free Now, CEO Europe
- Dr. Alexander von Frankenberg, High-Tech Gründerfonds Management GmbH, CEO
- Dr. Julia Freudenberg, Hacker School, CEO
- Christoph Gerlinger, German Startups Group GmbH & Co. KGaA, CEO
- Lisa Gradow, Investor
- Dr. Oliver Grün, Grün Software|GRÜN Software AG, CEO; Bundesverband IT-Mittelstand President
- Dr. Ute Günther, Business Angels Netzwerk Deutschland e.V. (BAND), CEO
- Finn Age Hänsel, SanityGroup GmbH, Founder and MD
- Dr. Fabian Heilemann, Earlybird Venture Capital Management GmbH & Co. KG, Partner
- Ulrike Hinrichs, Bundesverband Deutscher Kapitalbeteiligungsgesellschaften, CEO
- Anna Kaiser, Tandemploy GmbH, Founder and CEO
- Dr. Tom Kirschbaum, Door2Door GmbH, Founder and MD
- Dr. Tina Klüwer, Parlamind GmbH, CEO
- Prof. Dr. Dominik L. Michels, KAUST, Faculty
- Dr. Gesa Miczaika, Auxxo Beteiligungen GmbH, Founder
- Lena Sophie Müller, Initiative D21, CEO
- Judith Muttersbach-Dada, La Famiglia GmbH, CEO
- Florian Nöll, Bundesverband Deutsche Startups e.V., CEO
- Bastian Nominacher, Celonis SE, Co-Founder and Co-CEO
- Maria Piechnick, Wandelbots GmbH, Co-Founder and CPO
- Johannes Reck, GetYourGuide, Co-Founder and CEO
- Stephanie Renda, Bundesverband Deutsche Startups e.V., CEO
- André Schwämmlein, FlixMobility GmbH (FlixBus), Founder and CEO
- Miriam Wohlfarth, Ratepay GmbH, Founder and MD
- Christian Vollmann, Good Hood GmbH, CEO

== See also ==
- Council of Economic Advisers
- President's Management Advisory Board
- Strategic and Policy Forum
