= CODE University of Applied Sciences =

Private university in Berlin, Germany

Coordinates: 52.479742°N 13.439425°E

- Motto: Educating the digital pioneers of tomorrow
- Type: Private
- Established: 2017
- Founders: Thomas Bachem, Manuel Dolderer, Jonathan Rueth
- Affiliations: Stifterverband für die Deutsche Wissenschaft, German Startups Association, German Informatics Society
- Chancellor: Reimar Müller-Thum
- President: Peter Ruppel
- Students: approximately 450 (as of 04/2025)
- Location: Berlin, Germany
- Campus: urban (Kalle Neukölln)
- Website: code.berlin

The CODE University of Applied Sciences (see: CODE) is a private, state-recognized University of Applied Sciences for digital product development in Berlin, Germany.

== History ==
The university was founded in 2017 by Thomas Bachem, Manuel Dolderer and Jonathan Rüth, along with 24 internet entrepreneurs and startup investors. It was officially recognized on July 14, 2017, by the Senate of Berlin department for science and research.

Bachem stated that his personal experience learning that German universities' computer science study programs were of an outdated didactic and theoretical nature sparked the idea for CODE. Being an autodidact coder since his early youth, he saw no fitting institution for his kind.

== Supporters ==
Known supporters of CODE are Rolf Schrömgens (founder of Trivago), Benjamin Otto (heir to the Otto Group), Stephan Schambach, Patrick Adenauer, Ijad Madisch (founder of ResearchGate), Verena Pausder (founder of Fox and Sheep), Heiko Hubertz (founder of Bigpoint), Rafael Laguna (founder of Open-Xchange), Gabriele Pulvermüller (formerly Host Europe Group), Klaas Kersting (founder of Gameforge), Florian Heinemann (founder of Project A) and Christian Vollmann (a.o. founder of EDarling).

According to Meta Platforms COO Sheryl Sandberg, "CODE University is doing important work educating the next generation of students in advanced technological skills." She is "... confident those students will go on to do incredible things – they'll change our communities, our industries, and the world."

== Curriculum ==
=== Courses ===
The university offers three international English-language Bachelor's degree courses, each being six semesters long:

- Software Engineering (B.Sc.)
- Digital Design & Innovation (B.A.)
- Business Management & Entrepreneurship (B.A.)

All three courses are accredited by the German state and matching the European Bologna process.

As of 2025 CODE University of Applied Sciences also offers a state accredited master's degree program in Technology & Management (M.Sc.)

=== Didactics ===
CODE's learning approach can be described as competency-orientated, self-directed and problem-based, namely by using concepts such as Mastery Learning, Flipped Classroom and Peer Learning.

Aside from the subject-specific competences, the curriculum addresses topics like personal development and the ability to reflect oneself by implementation of a mentoring program.

From the beginning, students are working project-based and self-regulated in interdisciplinary teams of software developers, digital design & innovation and business management & entrepreneurship students. Next to student-led projects, others are created and selected in close cooperation with a number of companies and organisations.

All offered courses are grounded on a common competence framework. Each student receives input based on their abilities to enhance and develop them during their studies. Not only do students learn from industry professionals but also from their more advanced peers.

The interdisciplinary Science, Technology & Society Program is meant to confront the students with the effects of their work on questions of science, technological progress and society.

=== Admission process ===
All potential applicants have to go through a multi-level admission process in which classical measuring tools like school grades or certificates are completely irrelevant. The two-step admission process consists of a written online motivation letter and an Assessment day. According to the university, out of 2000 applicants from over 25 countries, 88 students were selected to join the very first winter semester of 2017.

=== Tuition fees ===
CODE University is financed by tuition fees that can be paid via a socially responsible, subsequent income-adjusted tuition-fee model. This way, the entire studies stay free of charge for any student for the course of their studies. This reversed generation agreement is realized by CODE, following the example of Witten/Herdecke University's StudierendenGesellschaft. After finishing their studies, students agree to repay the university a certain percentage of their income for several years. According to the university, more than 80% of all their students are opting for this model.

== Campus ==
The universities facilities are part of the modern office- and event location KALLE Neukölln. Next to Project and Learning Unit rooms, the university offers its students common areas, silent as well as communal working areas, a kitchen space where students can mingle and a “Maker Space” with lots of technical equipment, sponsored by one of its partners Telekom.

== Organizations and engagement ==
The founding team of the university also founded and financed the nonprofit organization Code+Design Initiative e.V. which offers nationwide vacation coding camps for children and adolescents in Germany. Aiming to spark young people's interest for digital technology and related professions, the organization also heavily focuses on raising the percentage of female professionals in the industry. Furthermore, it co-releases an annual magazine on studies and job orientation in design and coding in association with the publishing house Klett Group.

The university is a member of the German Donors' Association for the Promotion of Humanities and Sciences, the Association of Private Universities in Germany, the German Startups Association and the German Informatics Society. Additionally, Co-Founder Bachem is a senator of the German Academy of Science and Engineering.
