= Ting Inc. =

Wireless service company

- Company type: Subsidiary
- Industry: Internet service provider
- Founded: February 2, 2012; 14 years ago
- Headquarters: Toronto, Ontario, Canada
- Parent: Tucows Inc.
- ASN: 32133
- Website: www.ting.com

Ting Inc. is an American internet service provider founded by Tucows in 2012. It originally consisted of Ting Mobile, a mobile virtual network operator, and Ting Internet, an internet service provider that offered gigabit fiber Internet. In August 2020, most of Ting Mobile was sold to Dish Wireless. Today, Tucows continues to provide the enablement software for Ting Mobile (via Wavelo) and continues to operate Ting Internet independently.

== Ting Internet ==
Ting Internet is an American internet service provider. On December 15, 2014, Ting announced it was buying Blue Ridge Internetworks of Charlottesville, Virginia, which was already building fiber Internet. They began offering symmetrical gigabit fiber internet without bandwidth caps. Since expanding the existing fiber network in Charlottesville, Ting has also launched a similar service in 19 other markets. As of January 2025, they service the following areas:

- Alexandria, Virginia
- Angier, North Carolina
- Carlsbad, California
- Charlottesville, Virginia
- Centennial, Colorado
- Colorado Springs, Colorado
- Culver City, California
- Encinitas, California
- Fullerton, California
- Fuquay-Varina, North Carolina
- Greenwood Village, Colorado
- Holly Springs, North Carolina
- Memphis, Tennessee
- Roaring Fork, Colorado
- Rolesville, North Carolina
- Sandpoint, Idaho ("Greater Sandpoint Area")
- Sanford, North Carolina
- Solana Beach, California
- Wake Forest, North Carolina
- Westminster, Maryland

Ting's future expansion plans include Thornton, Colorado; Marana, Arizona; and Durango, Colorado.

In May 2016, Ting Internet launched the Bring Your Own Router option, allowing customers to use Ting's optical network terminal at no additional cost, while pairing it with their own third-party router.

In 2019, Ting acquired Cedar Holdings Group, a telecommunications provider serving multiple markets in the Western Slope of Colorado.

In 2021, they acquired the Tucson-based WISP provider SimplyBits as well.

== See also ==
- Ting Mobile
