= Myhomepage =

- Website type: AJAX
- Owner: Paragon Internet Group (Subsidiaries)
- Website: Myhomepage.com
- Registration: Private
- Launched: 2009
- Current status: Inactive

Myhomepage.com was founded in 2009 becoming a patented personalised homepage service with synchronised bookmarking and password manager software.

== Background ==
The URL was initially listed for $250,000 by Buydomains.com but later sold for $50,000 by Tucows. In 2010 myhomepage.com became a Microsoft Certified Partner built on a .Net SQL CLR development platform with an html AJAX front end system a .NET Framework due to its collaboration with Axosoft. The company subsequently raised $1.2 million through German Startups Group Berlin AG. Myhomepage Ltd. was incorporated at Companies House in 2009 by its two founding entrepreneurs Max Aengevelt and Massimo 'Max' Agostinelli. In 2010 both Aengevelt and Agostinelli were interviewed in Tavria-V by OK TV.

== Tucows Inc. ==
In 2009 the leading news site covering the domain name industry 'Domain Name Wire' reported that one of Tucows' subsidiaries, "BuyDomains has sold the domain name Myhomepage.com for $50,000. - "The buyer appears to be in Germany and the page currently resolves to WhyPark’s name servers". - "This will be one to watch, as the buyer clearly has plans for it". wrote Andrew Allemann. According to the 'DN Journal Top 20' the domain name was ranked No. 3 by Godaddy's AfternicsDSL. The Uniform Resource Locator (URL) myhomepage.com is ranked among the index of Top-level domain (TLD) globally. Myhomepage had trust seals certificates from Verisign, McAfee and TrustE linked to the domain name registrar including Yourhomepage.com in line with the Domain Name System Security Extensions (DNSSEC).

== See also ==
- German Startups Group Berlin AG
- iGoogle
- Netvibes
- Pageflakes
- Tucows
