= Tucows =

Canadian internet services and telecommunications company

Tucows Inc.
- Company type: Public
- Traded as: Nasdaq: TCX; TSX: TC; Russell 2000 Component
- Founded: 1993; 33 years ago in Flint, Michigan
- Headquarters: Toronto, Ontario
- Key people: Elliot Noss (CEO) Ivan Ivanov (CFO) Bret Fausett (chief legal officer) Justin Reilly (CEO, Wavelo) David Woroch (CEO, Tucows Domains) Robin Chase (chairman) Scott Swedorski (founder)
- Industry: Internet services mobile telecommunications telecom billing
- Products: OpenSRS; Hover; Enom; Ascio
- Services: domain name registration email hostings SSL Certificates; Internet service provider
- Revenue: ▲US$329 million (2017)
- Net income: ▲US$22 million USD (2017)
- Employees: ~1000
- Divisions: Ting Internet; Ting Mobile; Tucows Domains; Wavelo
- Website: tucows.com

Tucows Inc. is an American–Canadian, publicly traded Internet services and telecommunications company headquartered in Toronto, Ontario, Canada, and incorporated in Pennsylvania, United States. The company is composed of three independent businesses: Tucows Domains, Ting Internet, and Wavelo.

Tucows, which stands for "The Ultimate Collection Of Winsock Software", was founded in Flint, Michigan, in 1993 as a shareware and freeware software download site. Its original logo was two cow heads, a play on the homophone "two cows". The company shuttered its downloads business in 2021.

In 2012, Tucows launched Ting Mobile, a wireless service provider, and used the same brand to launch its fiber Internet provider business, Ting Internet, in 2015. In 2020, Tucows sold its wireless business to Dish Network while continuing to operate Ting Internet. The billing platform Tucows built for Ting Mobile was spun off into an independent OSS/BSS SaaS business, Wavelo.

== Company history ==
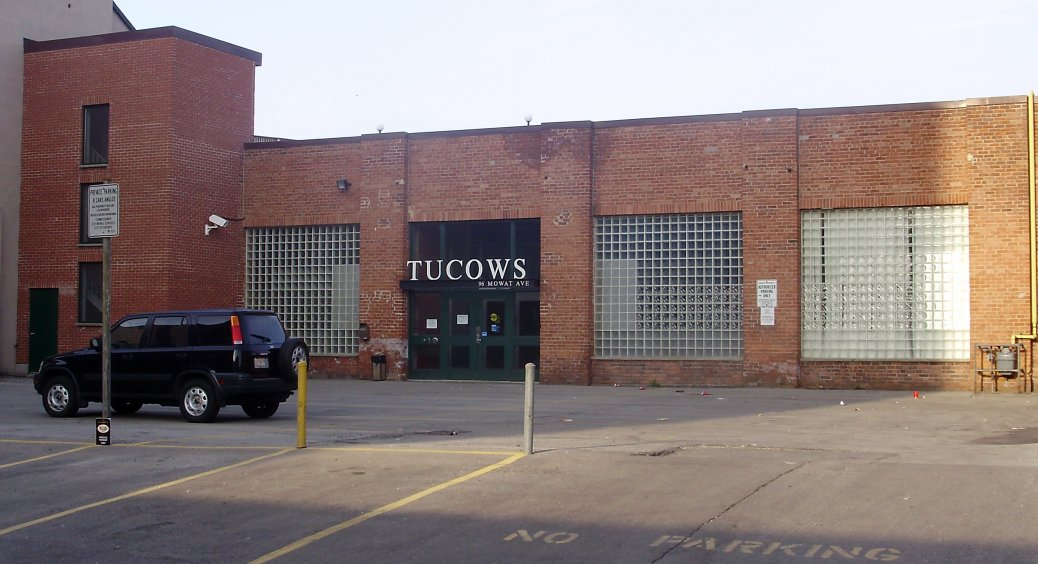
Tucows headquarters in Toronto

In the early 1990s, Tucows was hosted on university and public servers (much like Yahoo! and Google were in their early stages). Tucows' mission was to provide users with downloads of both freeware and trial versions of shareware. Internet Direct, owned and operated by John Nemanic, Bill Campbell, and Colin Campbell, acquired Tucows in 1996. STI Ventures acquired Tucows in 1999.

In 2000, Tucows acquired Linux Weekly News (which was then "unacquired" in 2002).

In 2001, Tucows was acquired by Infonautics, which then changed its name to Tucows, a business tactic called a "reverse takeover". On August 26, 2002, Tucows sold eLibrary and Encyclopedia.com, its search and reference services properties inherited from Infonautics, to Alacritude. The Internet Archive preserves a full copy of the Tucows Software Library, with thousands of software titles both in the latest versions, as well as in older versions not yet available through Tucows.

In 2004, Tucows acquired Boardtown Corporation, a billing software provider based in Starkville, Mississippi.

On August 19, 2005, Tucows went public, after completing a secondary offering, listing on the Toronto Stock Exchange as TC and the NASDAQ as TCX.

In January 2006, Tucows completed its acquisition of certain assets of Critical Path, an outsourced email services provider.

In June 2006 Tucows paid $18 million to purchase Mailbank.com Inc, a company that owns over 17,000 domain names for common surnames, such as smith.net and brown.org. Mailbank generates income from ads on its websites (from domain parking) and from customers who want e-mail accounts with their surname in the domain name.

On June 15, 2006, Noss disclosed that the portfolio of NetIdentity's domain names acquired by Tucows represents at least 68% of surnames in the United States and Europe, and that the cost of the acquisition was $18 million. On February 19, 2008, Tucows announced that they were launching a "Personal Names Service" using their portfolio of 39,000 domain names. "The launch of the Personal Names Service marks the complete integration of the surname assets we acquired with NetIdentity into our wholesale channel", said Elliot Noss, President and CEO of Tucows.

On August 26, 2006, Tucows won an eBay auction for the web calendar site Kiko.com. The company planned to roll Kiko's features into their existing email platform.

On July 27, 2007, Tucows acquired ItsYourDomain.com (IYD), another privately held ICANN-accredited wholesale registrar offering domain services through a network of over 2,500 affiliates with over 700,000 domains under management, paying US$10.35 million. ItsYourDomain.com managed 699,951 domains compared to Tucows's 5,919,987, at the time of the sale in July 2007 ItsYourDomain.com's monthly growth of 29,181 exceeded Tucows growth of 21,126.

Hover
- Website type: Public
- Founded: 2008; 18 years ago
- Headquarters: Toronto, Ontario, Canada
- Owner: Tucows
- Industry: Domain Name Registration
- Products: Domains and email
- Website: www.hover.com

By June 2008, Tucows had a total of three domain name registration services called ItsYourDomain (IYD), NetIdentity, and DomainDirect. Tucows decided to discontinue these three services, and merge them into one new domain name registration service, called Hover. Hover is a simple domain name registration service powered by Tucows Inc, that started in July 2008. All IYD, DomainDirect, and NetIdentity customers are fulfilled by Hover.com.

On November 6, 2008, Tucows announced that they were launching Butterscotch.com, an online video network with video tutorials to explain Internet technology, starting with 35 video tutorials and plans to reach 500 clips by Spring 2009. On October 14, 2011, Butterscotch.com producer Sean Carruthers stated production had been shut down.

In December 2014, Tucows launched RealNames, offering e-mail service using domain names acquired from Mailbank.com Inc.

On January 20, 2017, the company acquired eNom for $83.5 million, making Tucows the second-largest domain registrar in the world.

The company announced in January 2021 it was shuttering its Downloads business, as it was no longer essential to the rest of the company's business, but had transferred all of its assets and content to the Internet Archive prior to its closure.

== Business lines ==
In July 2008, Tucows rebranded its wholesale services as "Open SRS".

As of July 2023, Tucows is the third-largest accredited registrar in the world.

=== Domain portfolio management ===
Tucows has three sources of income from its domain portfolio: 1) Advertising from pages of domains within their domain name portfolio; 2) Sales of domains from their portfolio, which is constantly being replenished; 3) Auction of the steady stream of thousands of domain names that expire every day and become available for resale.

On November 14, 2007, Tucows disclosed that they offer pay-per-click advertising on the pages of domains within their domain name portfolio. When a user types one of these domain names into the address of the browser (direct navigation), they are presented with dynamically generated links which are pay-per-click advertising. Every time a user clicks on one of the links listed on a web page, it generates revenue for Tucows through its partnership with third parties who provide syndicated pay-per-click results.

On February 7, 2008, Tucows disclosed that it had switched from Google Ads to a new advertising partner in 2007, which led to a one-third increase in its revenue.

On May 7, 2008, Tucows announced it put a process in place for the regular sale of direct navigation names. These domain names would come from names that expire each month from customers who decide they no longer want the domain names and that Tucows is able to select the ones they want to keep from these domain names.

Tucows announced on June 12, 2008, that they have reached an agreement with Afternic to auction Tucows’ large daily inventory of expired domain names. "We have over eight million domains under management and thousands expiring every day, so this deal provides us with a great way to share revenue with our resellers while participating in Afternic’s popular secondary domain name marketplace”, said Bill Sweetman, General Manager of Tucows Domain Portfolio. Tucows will share 10% of the gross sale price with the reseller for the sale of expired domains that were originally registered through the reseller. Revenue will be shared automatically without the reseller having to take any additional action. Tucows chose Afternic as a partner even though SnapNames with Register.com and NameJet with NetSol/eNom are the dominant players in expired domains.

On October 29, 2008, Tucows announced that it would begin direct sales from their inventory of premium domain names under the brand name of Yummy Names. The service was created especially for marketers to obtain a high-quality domain name from Tucows inventory. Customers have the option of purchasing a premium domain name outright or leasing the name. In 2009 one of Tucows' subsidiaries, Buydomains Holdings, sold another premium domain name for a record $50,000 for Myhomepage.com.

On February 20, 2008, Tucows announced a portfolio of over 1,000 domain names that have the high potential value such as "Jewellers.com", "Actresses.com", "BasketballPlayers.com", and "ProjectManagers.com".

In February 2008, Tucows successfully defended against an arbitration proceeding over Batchelor.com, which it had acquired as part of its NetIdentity purchase. The complaint had been filed by Ken Batchelor Cadillac Company, a car dealership. A National Arbitration Forum panel determined that the dealership had not established rights in the mark "Batchelor". In fact, Tucows has won all surname-related arbitration proceedings.

In 2007, Weidner Investment Services filed a complaint claiming that Weidner was its trademark or service mark and asked the National Arbitration Forum to order the transfer of Weidner.com from Tucows to Weidner. Tucows failed to respond, and the National Arbitration Forum ordered Tucows to transfer Weidner.com to Weidner Investment Services.

In January 2017, eNom was sold to Canadian domain seller Tucows for $83.5M Canadian.

=== Email services ===
Tucows provides millions of email boxes through their network of over 9,000 service providers. Customers of Tucows fully hosted email service are provided with POP3, IMAP, WAP and webmail access. Providers using Tucows Email Service have the option of using Tucows' spam and virus filtering with their current email infrastructure.

As part of the NetIdentity acquisition, Tucows had problems migrating retail customers' email from a third-party provider to Tucows in-house mail systems in September 2006.

Starting August 12, 2008, Tucows Email Service running on their servers designated as Cluster A experienced a multi-day outage lasting until August 15, 2008. On October 6, 2008, Cluster A again suffered another multi-day outage affecting at least 50% of users and at times all users. As of the afternoon of October 9, 2008, this cluster was still partially down ("degraded") preventing an unknown number of users from being able to retrieve email.

=== Retail services ===
Tucows sells services to consumers and small businesses and offers personalized email through net identity. Tucows also offers customers hosting and other services with NetIdentity. Tucows also expected to receive income for pay per click advertising revenue from domain parking the surnames.

=== Mobile phone services ===
In February 2012, Tucows launched a new mobile virtual network operator in the United States known as Ting, which resells voice and data services on the T-Mobile US network. As of July 2018, the service had approximately 286,000 subscribers.

In 2017, Tucows acquired Canadian MVNO Roam Mobility from Otono Networks. Roam Mobility ran for three years until it was shut down in June 2020, likely due to travel slowdown from the COVID-19 pandemic.

On August 3, 2020, Tucows announced that it would sell the Ting Mobile business to Dish Network (owner of Boost Mobile) and serve as its provider of backend services for its new wireless businesses.

As of 2022, Tucows no longer runs its mobile phone service and has shifted focus to software enablement for other providers.

=== Internet services ===
On December 15, 2014, Tucows announced its acquisition of the Charlottesville, Virginia ISP Blue Ridge InternetWorks, which was building a fiber to the home network. The services were brought under Tucows' Ting branding. They began offering symmetrical gigabit fiber internet without bandwidth caps. Since expanding the existing fiber network in Charlottesville, Ting Internet is currently in 12 markets with more on the way.

=== Software (SaaS) ===
In January 2022, Tucows launched Wavelo, a software as a service (SaaS) company that builds telecom billing and operations software for Mobile Virtual Network Operators and Fiber Internet Services. They have two products: MONOS (Mobile Network Operating System) currently used by Dish Network and ISOS (Internet Services Operating System) currently used by Ting Internet.

== Controversy ==
On 15 February 2023, Delhi High Court ordered the Indian IT Ministry to block Tucows and other domain registrars over cybersquatting and non-compliance with India's IT Rules, 2021.

== De-emphasis and divestment of business lines ==
=== De-emphasis of software downloads ===
Tucows maintained a download archive that included more than 30,000 software titles in its worldwide network of partner sites. Although some listing features now have fees, basic listing remains free. Tucows founder Scott Swedorski announced his resignation in November 2003. On March 10, 2006, Tucows Content division closed its satellite office located in Flint, Michigan, and relocated the remaining editorial functions to its corporate head office in Toronto. On February 7, 2008, Tucows disclosed that Tucows plans to de-emphasize the software download aspect of their business. The download service was finally closed down in January 2021.

=== Divestment of web hosting accounts ===
On May 6, 2008, Tucows announced that they are getting out of the web hosting business. As part of the divestment Tucows signed an agreement for Hostopia to purchase about 14,000 Domain Direct, NetIdentity and ItsYourDomain.com (IYD) customer web hosting accounts and would migrate the web hosting accounts to Hostopia's unified web service platform by July 2008.

=== Divestment of equity interest in Afilias ===
On November 5, 2008, Tucows announced that it was selling its entire 7.38% equity interest in Afilias for $7.4 million. Afilias is the registry operator of the .info and .aero TLDs, and the service provider of the .org generic top-level domain (gTLD), .mobi mobile phone TLD, and a provider of domain name registry services for several countries around the world, including .AG (Antigua and Barbuda), .BZ (Belize), .GI (Gibraltar), .HN (Honduras), .IN (India), .ME (Montenegro), .SC (the Seychelles), and .VC (St. Vincent and the Grenadines).

== Reputation ==
=== Domain name add grace period (AGP) abuse ===
On January 8, 2008, Tucows explained its values and position on domain name front running: "We work to uphold the rights of Registrants. That means, for example, not putting 60-day locks on domains when a Registrant makes a change to their WHOIS information effectively locking some into a renewal and blocking domain name transfers to other Registrars. That also means having a clear, defined policy surrounding expiry and redemption periods." Tucows addresses domain tasting "by charging our Resellers a monetary fee on domain name registrations that are cancelled within the five-day Add Grace Period (AGP)", but it "doesn’t use WHOIS query data or search data from our API to front-run domain names".

Although it supports ICANN’s fee to discourage domain tasting and Google's decision to drop names added and deleted during the AGP from its AdSense program, Tucows claimed that AGP abuse could be further curbed by shortening the AGP period to 12 hours or less, sufficient time for registrants to correct spelling mistakes—AGP's original purpose.

=== Registrations to sites selling illegal goods and connections to terrorism ===
In 2015, the U.S. Trade Representative included Tucows on its annual "notorious markets" list—the first time it has named a domain name registrar—in order to set an example for what happens to registrars that do not block or suspend sites that sell illegal goods. Tucows responded that it suspended dozens of sites every day, but that "unlike some competitors, it considered all complaints carefully to ensure they were justified".

Tucows used to be the domain name registrar for the notorious American imageboard 8chan, which has been delisted by Google for hosting child pornography, and seen numerous swatting attacks and terrorist attacks announced and planned by users, notably the 2019 Christchurch mosque shootings. It is also a domain name registrar for the social media platform Truth Social, the white nationalist website Stormfront, and the shadow library search engine Anna's Archive.

in 2021, Tucows launched a framework to explain their role in dealing with domain name abuse.

== See also ==
- Domain name registrar
