= Sevenload =

German-based video-sharing website

sevenload GmbH
- Company type: Limited liability company
- Website type: Video hosting service
- Available in: 12 languages on more than 20 localized country portals
- Headquarters: Cologne, Germany
- Area served: Europe
- Founders: Ibrahim Evsan, Thomas Bachem, Axel Schmiegelow
- Key people: Manfred Ruf (CEO)
- Industry: Social Media, IPTV and web TV
- Website: Sevenload.com
- Registration: Optional
- Launched: April 2006
- Current status: Discontinued

Sevenload was a German-based video-sharing website on which users can upload, share and view videos. Since its founding in April 2006, the platform emerged on international markets to become a Social Media Network for photos, videos and web TV content. sevenload shows licensed content channels and allows users to upload their video and photo contents onto the site and then tag them, put them in albums and share them with other users, and is considered by some to be a counterpart to hulu in the US. Premium content and user generated videos at sevenload.com create an entertainment portal of editorial and professional web TV shows online. Selected content of sevenload's entire program airs on next generation TVs, set-top-box technology and games consoles with partners such as Sony, Philips Net TV, T-Home Entertain, Medion and Nintendo Wii. sevenload is currently available in twelve languages and offers localized country portals in Germany, France, Italy, Spain, Sweden, Poland, Russia, Turkey, UK, USA, Netherlands, Malaysia, Singapore, Australia, Japan, Indonesia, South Korea, India, China, Colombia and Mexico.

== History ==
The company was founded in April 2006 by Ibrahim Evsan, Thomas Bachem, Axel Schmiegelow's Venture firm dw capital gmbh, and K2 Interactive GmbH of Akgün and Tamer Kulmac. The Video Player technology the company was founded with had been developed since Fall 2005 by Ibrahim Evsan and Thomas Bachem. dw capital invested the first seed funds of 250.000,- € at foundation of the company. K2 ceased having any active role in the company in August 2006. Axel Schmiegelow developed the Licensing and Business Model as a co-founder and became CEO in August / September 2006. Andreas Heyden, in-house founder of sevenload competitor Clipfish at RTL Group, joined the company as COO in 2007.

Company executives at the time were Axel Schmiegelow (CEO) and Andreas Heyden (COO). Company investors are T-Online Venture Fund, DLD Ventures (Burda), Media Ventures, Martin Varsavsky and dw capital GmbH. The Co-founders Ibrahim Evsan (former CTO) and Thomas Bachem (former Director Technology) left the company in September 2009 to start a new venture.

On December 15, 2010, the German newspaper Handelsblatt reported that DLD Ventures, as part of Burda Digital, had taken over the shareholding of T-Venture Funds, effective December 17, 2010 and thereby gained a majority stake in the company. As a result of this transaction, the company's management structure and supervisory board changed: Andreas Heyden assumed the position of CEO in the company's management team from Axel Schmiegelow, who took on a new role in sevenload's supervisory board. In addition, Dr. Jörg Lübcke, managing director of Burda Digital, joined the supervisory board along with Dr. Marcel Reichart and Axel Schmiegelow.

According to the reports, the former investors Media Ventures and Martin Varsavsky made their exit and only DLD Ventures as well as dw capital are the remaining company investors. In summary, the exact share holder structure of sevenload and involvement of other investors remains unclear.

On July 6, 2011, Manfred Ruf became CEO of Sevenload

In spring 2014 Burda Digital tried to sell Sevenload, but didn't succeed; subsequently, on April 4, 2014, the site went offline.

== Contents ==
Among user generated content, sevenload claims to host over 1,000 web TV shows in their channels. These selected premium channels host various official pages of artists, music labels, musicians and TV shows even in HD-quality, but also include UGC video content similar to the typical YouTube channels. Depending on the geo-location of the client, not every content is displayed in every country.

sevenload keeps partnerships with renowned partners. Universal Music has its own Branded Channel for distributing music clips, MTV Networks shows selected formats like A Shot at Love and the MTV Crispy News and many other partners, among them National Geographic, Saturday Night Live and FOX, show their contents in the sevenload channels.

As a new media company, sevenload positions itself as a provider of cross-media marketing and advertising solutions as well as modern video technology. Part of sevenload's core business comes from the conceptualization, development and production of IPTV based internet platforms, software solutions for Web 2.0 applications as well as technology development for third-party companies looking for video player, video uploading, video linking and distribution technologies. sevenload has already worked with internationally renowned companies such as BMW, Nokia, Sony and Universal Music, and offers companies individual white label solutions.

== Technical Notes ==
All videos on sevenload get saved in the Flash Video and H.264 formats (file extensions: .flv, .mp4). The videos can be replayed online as a stream in any web browser. To watch the videos in a web browser the Adobe Flash plug-ins must be installed. Videos can be uploaded up to a size of 1,5 GB in all current formats, e.g. AVI, MPEG or QuickTime. Before further distributing the videos, they are converted in the Flash Video formats by sevenload. Users can upload pictures up to a size of 10 MB. The following formats are accepted: JPEG, GIF, PNG, BMP, TIF, JP2, PSD, WMF and EPS.

Since February 2009, videos can be uploaded in High Definition quality. The upload limit has been increased from 200 Megabytes up to 1.5 Gigabytes.

== Localization ==
Country	URL	Language
Australia	https://web.archive.org/web/20090721134137/http://au.sevenload.com/	English
China	https://web.archive.org/web/20090805053902/http://cn.sevenload.com/	Chinese
France	https://web.archive.org/web/20090720053110/http://fr.sevenload.com/	French
Germany	https://web.archive.org/web/20070112035741/http://de.sevenload.com/	German
India	https://web.archive.org/web/20090720050719/http://in.sevenload.com/	English
Indonesia	https://web.archive.org/web/20090720045321/http://id.sevenload.com/	English
Italy	https://web.archive.org/web/20090722043048/http://it.sevenload.com/	Italian
Japan	https://web.archive.org/web/20090725093740/http://jp.sevenload.com/	Japanese
South Korea	https://web.archive.org/web/20090505084647/http://kr.sevenload.com/	Korean
Malaysia	https://web.archive.org/web/20090725101152/http://my.sevenload.com/	English
Netherlands	https://web.archive.org/web/20090823042701/http://nl.sevenload.com/	Dutch
Poland	https://web.archive.org/web/20080828043331/http://pl.sevenload.com/	Polish
Russia	https://web.archive.org/web/20090728020018/http://ru.sevenload.com/	Russian
Spain	https://web.archive.org/web/20090722125841/http://es.sevenload.com/	Spanish
Singapore	http://sin.sevenload.com/	English
Sweden	https://web.archive.org/web/20090822013003/http://se.sevenload.com/	English
Turkey	https://web.archive.org/web/20090728020033/http://tr.sevenload.com/	Turkish
United Kingdom	https://web.archive.org/web/20090721221514/http://uk.sevenload.com/	English
United States	https://web.archive.org/web/20070906085148/http://en.sevenload.com/	English

Since 2011 Poland is Banned on Sevenload. In May 2011, Sevenload announced that they will no longer offer its service in Turkey. Since May service is also not available in India.

== See also ==
- User-generated content
- Web 2.0
- IPTV
- Web TV
- internet television
- Social media
- comparison of video services
