= Republic Wireless =

Former American mobile virtual network operator

Republic Wireless, Inc.
- Final logo, used from 2021 to 2023
- Type: Subsidiary
- Founded: January 2010; 16 years ago (Note: Its service was not launched until 2011.)
- Defunct: August 31, 2023; 3 years ago
- Fate: Folded into Boost Infinite
- Successor: Boost Infinite
- Headquarters: Englewood, Colorado, United States
- Area served: Continental United States
- Number of employees: 100
- Parent: Dish Wireless
- Website: www.republicwireless.com

Republic Wireless (stylized in all lowercase) was an American mobile virtual network operator (MVNO). Republic sold low cost mobile phone service on partner networks. Republic started as a unique company that provided customers with VOIP numbers which relied on WiFi first with cell as a backup.

In March 2021, Republic was acquired by Dish Wireless. During that year, it converted to providing conventional cellular service. In July 2021, they switched their primary network services provider from T-Mobile to AT&T. In 2023, the company began shutting down and transitioning customers to different plans on Boost Infinite.

== Customers ==
As of 2021, the company had about 200,000 subscribers, and as of 2019 it had close to $100 million in annual revenue. Trade publication Inside Towers wrote that its customers "appear to be more tech savvy than most, and also more price conscious".

== History ==
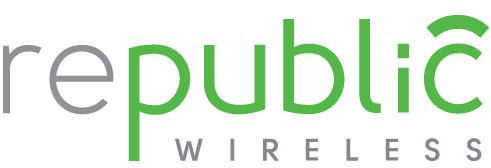
Former logo from 2011 to November 28, 2021.

=== Early history ===
Republic was an early provider of WiFi-first MVNO services.

Created in January 2010 as a subsidiary of Bandwidth.com, the company announced it would provide a monthly subscription of $19 per month for wireless service with unlimited calling, texting, and data on a "Hybrid Calling" system.

Republic Wireless began beta service on November 8, 2011, with the LG Optimus S and later the Motorola Defy XT in July 2012. On November 19, 2012, Republic Wireless ended its private beta and transitioned to an open, public beta.

On November 14, 2013, Republic officially came out of its Beta testing period and began offering the Moto X for $299 with four new service plans starting at $5 per month.

In 2013, the company introduced WiFi-to-cellular handover so that calls could transition from Wi-Fi to cell tower service.

=== Additional models and new technology ===
On March 13, 2014, Republic officially announced the release of their next phone, the Motorola Moto G which was priced at $149 for the 8GB and $179 for the 16GB version. The Moto G was released for sale on April 17, 2014. Unlike Moto X which offered four service plans, Moto G offered only three service plans. (Moto G did not offer the 4G service plan.) On October 15, 2014, Republic released the Motorola Moto E pricing it at $99. On November 26, 2014, Republic announced that they would be offering the 16 GB second generation Moto X for $399 beginning December 10, 2014.

In 2015, the company introduced cellular-to-WiFi handover.

In July 2016, Republic added several phone models from Samsung, LG, and Huawei, in addition to its already-established Motorola line. Also, the switch was made to new plans on the T-Mobile network, replacing their older plans using the Sprint network.

In August 2016, Republic also added a bring-your-own-phone (BYOP) compatibility to its service plans by offering SIM card kit sales in their online store.

On December 1, 2016, Republic Wireless announced its spin-off from Bandwidth.com.

Also in 2016, the company introduced "bonded calling" to use cell service while still keeping the call on a WiFi connection.

On December 6, 2017, Republic Wireless announced a new physical product called Relay. This screen-less device uses LTE and WiFi in order to allow communication between it, other relay devices and a companion smartphone app. It also contains a GPS tracker so that those with the companion app are able to know where the user of the device is. Relay became available for ordering May 2018 at the dedicated Relay website.

=== Acquisition and shutdown ===
In March 2021, television provider Dish Network agreed to acquire Republic Wireless for an undisclosed price, as part of a series of acquisitions that also included Boost Mobile and Ting Mobile, with a longer-term plan to move customers to Dish's own in-development 5G network. The acquisition was completed in May 2021. Dish said that Republic Wireless would be kept as a separate brand from Dish. Industry analyst Martha DeGrasse wrote that Dish probably acquired the company mainly for its engineers and technology rather than for its existing subscriber base.

According to FierceWireless, Dish said that customers would not experience "immediate changes" following the acquisition.

It was announced that the Relay products would be split out as a separate company: Relay, Inc.

As part of the transition, the company's leadership team was replaced; it was announced that co-founder Chris Chuang would leave the company and Robert Currie would take over as head of Republic Wireless.

On July 10, 2023, Dish announced that Republic Wireless would be shutting down. Customers were moved to Boost Infinite with the transition completed on August 31, 2023.

== Hybrid calling ==
Originally Wi-Fi networks were used as the primary data and connectivity source to the network, while the cellular network was used as a failover if no Wi-Fi networks were in range of the device. The model relied on a proprietary VoIP application for the Android operating system that has the ability to switch quickly between Sprint's CDMA mobile network or T-Mobile's GSM mobile network, free roaming, and WiFi, depending on which access network is available.

As of 2022, this Wi-Fi first calling method is not supported for new customers or phones purchased on the "bring your own phone" program, or for phones purchased from Republic Wireless.

== Reception ==
=== Initial rollout ===
TechCrunch expressed excitement about the announcement and described the plan as potentially disruptive to the wireless markets. The publication described the "WiFi first" model as an attractive feature because of the prevalence of WiFi access and the superiority of WiFi connections over digital mobile networks, which they expect will improve call reception and clarity. CNET wrote that the low price point would be "a home run" for parents who are interested in low-cost plans for young children. The Atlantic was more hesitant, acknowledging that the price point would be attractive to some consumers but speculating that the low-cost business model may lead to unreliable service. The magazine also suggested that since Republic Wireless purchases its air time wholesale from Sprint, it is dependent on major telecommunications companies who may be inclined to limit the company's growth to prevent it from becoming too disruptive.

PC World questioned Republic Wireless' marketing the plan as "unlimited" given the expectations that users monitor a "Cellular Usage Index" and remain within "fair use guidelines". The magazine faulted the company for advertising unlimited voice and data while simultaneously describing membership as a "privilege" and reserving the right to terminate users who crossed an undefined "fair use threshold". MSNBC wrote that coverage will be unlimited on WiFi access but when on the mobile network, consumers will be held to a monthly limit of 550 minutes of voice, 150 SMS, and 300 megabytes of data or face termination of their subscription. In December 2011, Republic Wireless eliminated this fair use threshold.

=== Pre-acquisition ===
ZDNet gave the company a 9 out of 10 star review in November, 2013 saying "You are unlikely to find a phone as capable and priced as low as the Republic Wireless Moto X...the service offerings are fantastic." Republic also received the Laptop Magazine Editor's Choice Award and was cited "one of the best bargains in wireless."

Walt Mossberg of the Wall Street Journal gave rave reviews to Republic when they came out of Beta testing in November, 2013 saying this was a chance for callers to get "a top-tier, current-model smartphone with all the bells and whistles, and pay between $5 and $40 a month for unlimited voice, text and data."

Huffington Post said Republic had true "stick it to the man potential" in a November, 2013 piece. The article went on to say "The world needs a place where they have access to first class technology at a very low price ... Enter Republic Wireless."

The Art of Being Cheap claims Republic is "... Such a better deal than any other phone on the market, that there really are no viable competitors" in a November, 2013 piece once the company had come out of Beta.

In April 2014, an article in The Wealth Gospel posited that Republic is "poised to be a disruptor in the mobile telecommunications market," citing that the company offers customers an opportunity to "shrug off the shackles of contracts and high monthly costs."

On November 12, 2013, Republic was voted the Lifehacker Most Popular Pre-Paid/MVNO Carrier with 31% of the vote.

Marguerite Reardon of CNET praised Republic's "cut-throat pricing", especially for consumers who only want voice and text, but faulted unreliable hand-off between Wi-Fi and cellular service, and small variety of available handsets, and said "customers who are having problems with the service never actually get to speak to a real human".

In March 2014, Republic Wireless Chairman David Morken said the number of customers subscribed to the company's service totaled several hundred thousand. In 2014, it was the top-rated prepaid cell phone provider in the latest rankings by Consumer Reports.

=== Post-acquisition ===
In December 2021, following its acquisition by Dish, Republic Wireless announced changes to its plans that drew a negative reaction from existing customers; one customer wrote that they couldn't "find the door fast enough". Industry analyst Martha DeGrasse speculated that customers might move to competitors if fees increased.
