= Pageflakes =

Personal web portal

Pageflakes was an Ajax-based startpage or personal web portal similar to Netvibes, My Yahoo!, Myhomepage, iGoogle, and Microsoft Live that operated from 2005 until January 2012. The site was organized into tabs, each tab containing user-selected modules called Flakes. Each Flake varied in content; information such as RSS/Atom feeds, Calendar, Notes, Web search, weather forecast, del.icio.us bookmarks, Flickr photos, social networking tools like Facebook, YouTube, Twitter, email and user-created modules. Pagecasts allowed users to share their pages publicly, allowing them to share a curated page of content that would be of interest to others (in essence a widget-based precursor to pages shared through content sharing sites such as Pinterest).Pageflakes had 250,000 Flakes and over 130,000 Pagecasts.

== History ==
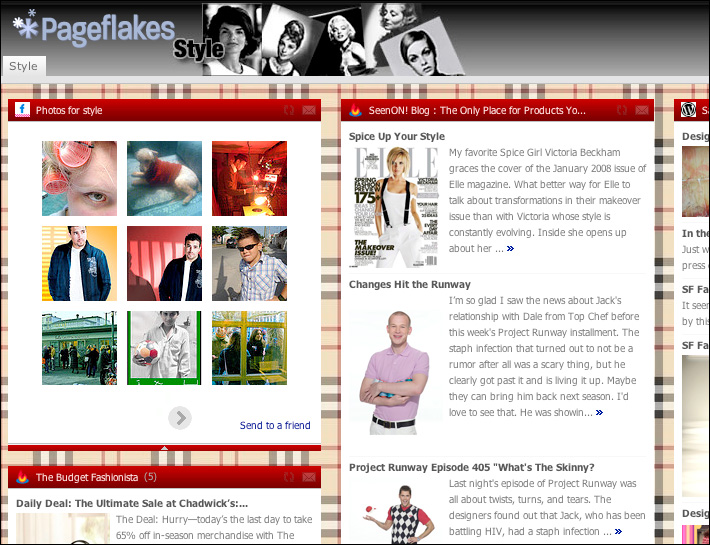
Sample Pageflakes page

Pageflakes was launched at the end of 2005. The site began in Germany, but was headquartered in San Francisco, United States. The company was initially privately funded. Balderton Capital (originally Benchmark Capital Europe) invested an undisclosed amount in May 2006. Dan Cohen was appointed CEO in January 2007. Pageflakes was acquired by LiveUniverse in 2008.

== Underlying Technology ==
Some of the major components used for building the framework were ASP.NET 2.0, including the ASP.NET AJAX components, and JavaScript. However developers building flakes could use a more diverse toolset.

== See also ==
- iGoogle
- Live.com
- Myhomepage
- Netvibes
- Yahoo.com
