= European Digital SME Alliance =

European DIGITAL SME Alliance
- Abbreviation: DIGITAL SME
- Location: Brussels, Belgium
- Region served: European Union
- President: Oliver Grün
- Website: www.digitalsme.eu

The European DIGITAL SME Alliance is a community of small and medium ICT enterprises (SMEs). Its members are national sectorial digital SME associations in 30 countries and regions in the EU and neighboring countries, all together it associates more than 45,000 SMEs. DIGITAL SME was established in 2007 (back then it was named Pan European ICT & eBusiness Network for SME) to represent the voice of ICT SMEs and their interests in the European institutions and other international organisations. DIGITAL SME is the first European association of the ICT sector exclusively. The current president is Oliver Grün.

== History and main achievements ==
Following a prominent public discussion on patentability of software, the Pan European ICT & eBusiness Network for SMEs was founded in 2007. Its establishment was initiated by UEAPME (European Association of Craft, Small and Medium-sized Enterprises), now referred to as SMEunited, whose member DIGITAL SME has been from then on.

In 2013, the Pan European ICT & eBusiness Network for SMEs was among the founding members of SBS (Small Business Standards). Since then, DIGITAL SME representatives have always been appointed to SBS Board, and its experts have been taking part in the technical committees of European standardisation bodies: George Sharkov – ETSI TC CYBER expert, Massimo Vanetti – OneM2M expert, Fabio Guasconi – ISO/IEC JCT 1 SC 27 expert, George Babinov – ETSI ATTM expert, Emil Dimitrov – ETSI TCCE expert. In addition, DIGITAL SME and SBS representative prof. Vladimir Poulkov was elected as a vice chairman of the ETSI general assembly in 2016.

In 2016, the Pan European ICT & eBusiness Network for SMEs has changed its name to European DIGITAL SME Alliance. The same year, it became a founding member of another important body – European Cyber Security Organisation (ECSO). DIGITAL SME is particularly active also in the management of ECSO: its President Oliver Grün was appointed as SME member of ECSO Managing Board and of the Partnership Board, while DIGITAL SME's Secretary General Sebastiano Toffaletti is chairing the WG4 - Support to SMEs, coordination with countries (in particular East and Central EU) and regions.

The same year (2016), DIGITAL SME also became a member and a pledger of the newly created Digital Skills and Jobs Coalition - an initiative created by the European Commission to tackle e-skills gap in Europe.

In the period of 2015–2016, DIGITAL SME was campaigning for the creation of an open market for data usage, where both manufacturers and users of data-producing machines are entitled to use the data. DIGITAL SME's recommendations were taken up by the European Commission that announced the Communication on Building a European Data Economy and accompanying Staff Working document. The reference was made to DIGITAL SME's position paper (published earlier in 2015).

In May 2017, European DIGITAL SME Alliance launched the #digitalSME4skills campaign that was initiated in the framework of Digital Skills and Jobs Coalition. The campaign calls European SMEs to train young professionals and help them gaining digital skills through Apprenticeship schemes. In addition, DIGITAL SME President Oliver Grün joined the Coalition's governing board.

In July 2017, reacting to the upcoming review of European Cybersecurity Strategy, European DIGITAL SME Alliance has published its position paper on cybersecurity, developed in a cooperation with ECSO.

Since its establishment in 2007, DIGITAL SME was guided by 5 presidents:

- from June 2015: Oliver Grün (Germany)
- 2013–2015: Bo Sejer Frandsen (Denmark)
- 2012–2013: Charles Huthwaite (UK)
- 2010–2012: Bruno Robine (France)
- 2007–2010: Johann Steszgal (Austria)

== Members ==
Members of the European DIGITAL SME Alliance are national associations of ICT SMEs in European Union and neighboring countries. The member organisations are:

- AGORIA (Belgium)
- BASSCOM - Bulgarian Association of Software Companies (Bulgaria)
- CNA - Comunicazione e Terziario Avanzato, Confederazione Nazionale dell’Artigianato e della Piccola e Media impresa (Italy)
- ESTIC / CONETIC - Asociación Empresarial del Sector TIC (Spain)
- DIGITAL SME France (France)
- It-forum midtjylland (Denmark)
- UKITA - United Kingdom IT Association (UK)
- Skillnet Ireland (Ireland)
- BITMi – Bundesverband IT-Mittelstand e.V. (Germany)
- Vojvodina ICT Cluster (Serbia)
- Belgrade Chamber of Commerce, IT Association (Serbia)
- STIKK - Kosovo Association of Information and Communication Technology (Kosovo)
- Balkan and Black Sea ICT Clusters Network (Albania, Bosnia and Herzegovina, Romania, Bulgaria, Greece, Latvia, Montenegro, Serbia, North Macedonia, Ukraine)
- CLUSIT – Associazione Italiana per la Sicurezza Informatica (Italy)

== Goals and activities ==
European DIGITAL SME Alliance has the following goals:

- to represent the interests of its members vis-à-vis the institutions of the European Union;
- to promote exchange of experience and know-how amongst its members;
- to carry out actions at the European level, dealing with variety of topics that are relevant to ICT SMEs. Such actions or initiatives might include: participation in or organization of training programmes, conferences, seminars, research activities;
- to provide information to the members on European policies related to ICT sector;
- to promote SMEs’ interests in the standardisation process, to raise SMEs’ awareness about standardization, to motivate SMEs to become involved in the standardisation process.

European DIGITAL SME Alliance performs the following activities:

- monitors EU policies and regulations on ICT, gets involved into their creation processes, and informs its members about these policies (e.g. promotion of 10 policy ideas to enhance the EU digital SME Economy; lobbying against the tax breaks for the multinational companies, etc.);
- participates in the EU funded projects, such as UNICORN, Sabina, eCF Alliance, cyberwatching.eu, COMPACT, ICT sectoral approach in SBS;
- participates in and organizes conferences and seminars;
- takes part in various European initiatives, working groups, etc. (such as European Digital Skills and Jobs Coalition, European Social Dialogue for the IT sector, etc.);
- produces newsletters and studies;
- performs research activities on ICT related areas;
- participates in the Social Dialogue.

== DIGITAL SME Project activities ==
UNICORN is a Horizon 2020 project that aims at simplifying the design, deployment and management of multi-cloud services. DIGITAL SME acts as a project communications coordinator, and is reaching out to SMEs’ community.

SABINA is an EU funded Horizon 2020 project that aims at developing new technology and financial models to exploit synergies between electrical flexibility and the thermal inertia of buildings. DIGITAL SME is in charge of all standardisation related activities of the SABINA project. These include analysis of standards landscape in the scope of SABINA and provision of recommendations on the elevation of SABINA project items to formal standards.

eCF Alliance is an Erasmus+ project that aims at developing ICT vocational education training programmes and certifications based on eCF framework and the ESCO IT occupations. Main DIGITAL SME responsibility in the project – project governance, and management of the Stakeholders’ Committee.

cyberwatching.eu is a Horizon 2020 project which seeks to create and maintain an Observatory of the European and national research and innovation projects in the field of cybersecurity. DIGITAL SME is responsible for stakeholders’ (especially SMEs’) engagement, early validation and animation of the end-users club for SMEs and the marketplace.

ICT Sectoral approach in SBS Digital SME is responsible for the implementation and coordination of all the ICT sectoral activities within the Working Programme of the Small Business Standards. This includes, but is not limited to, representation of ICT SMEs’ interests in the standardisation processes at European and international standardization bodies, awareness raising activities among the SMEs (but also among the policy makers, other organisations, etc.) about the benefits of standards.

== Partnerships ==
European DIGITAL SME Alliance is:

- a founding member of Small Business Standards (SBS);
- a founding member of European Cyber Security Organisation (ECSO);
- a member of the European Association of Craft, Small and Medium-sized Enterprises (UEAPME).
