= Boost Infinite =

American telecommunications company

- Type: Subsidiary
- Industry: Wireless telecommunications
- Founded: December 7, 2022; 3 years ago
- Defunct: July 17, 2024; 2 years ago
- Fate: Folded into Boost Mobile
- Successor: Boost Mobile
- Headquarters: Littleton, Colorado, United States
- Products: Mobile telephony Wireless broadband
- Parent: Dish Wireless
- Website: www.boostinfinite.com

Boost Infinite was an American wireless service provider. It was a wholly owned subsidiary of Dish Wireless. Boost Infinite used the Boost, AT&T, and T-Mobile networks.

== History ==
Dish Network acquired Boost Mobile on July 1, 2020, as part of an agreement with T-Mobile. The agreement with T-Mobile allows Dish to use T-Mobile's network until 2027. On July 19, 2021, Dish announced an agreement with AT&T to use AT&T's network until 2031 and the option for AT&T to use Dish's wireless spectrum on their network.

Boost Infinite launched on December 7, 2022, offering beta access to select customers and launching full service the following year.

Dish began notifying Republic Wireless customers on July 10, 2023, that Republic Wireless would be shutting down and they would be transferring to Boost Infinite. The transition to Boost Infinite completed on August 31, 2023, and Republic Wireless shut down the same day. However, many Republic Wireless customers have experienced loss of service, and often their phone number, for lengthy periods as Boost Infinite has been so far incapable of migrating them to their service.

Dish and Amazon announced an agreement on July 25, 2023, to sell Boost Infinite on Amazon. Amazon sells prepaid wireless services and Boost Infinite became the first postpaid wireless service sold on the online retail. Amazon Prime members are automatically pre-qualified to sign up for Boost Infinite's service.

On July 17, 2024 Boost Infinite was merged into a rebranded Boost Mobile. On June 30, 2026, Dish DBS and Dish Wireless filed for prepackaged Chapter 11 bankruptcy in Texas, listing assets and liabilities between $10 billion and $50 billion. The filing allows for Dish to pay its debt obligations and complete the transition of Dish Wireless to Boost Mobile following spectrum transactions. Dish plans to emerge from bankruptcy by the third quarter of 2026 with plans to wind down operations at Dish Wireless.
