= Oliver Grün =

German engineer and entrepreneur

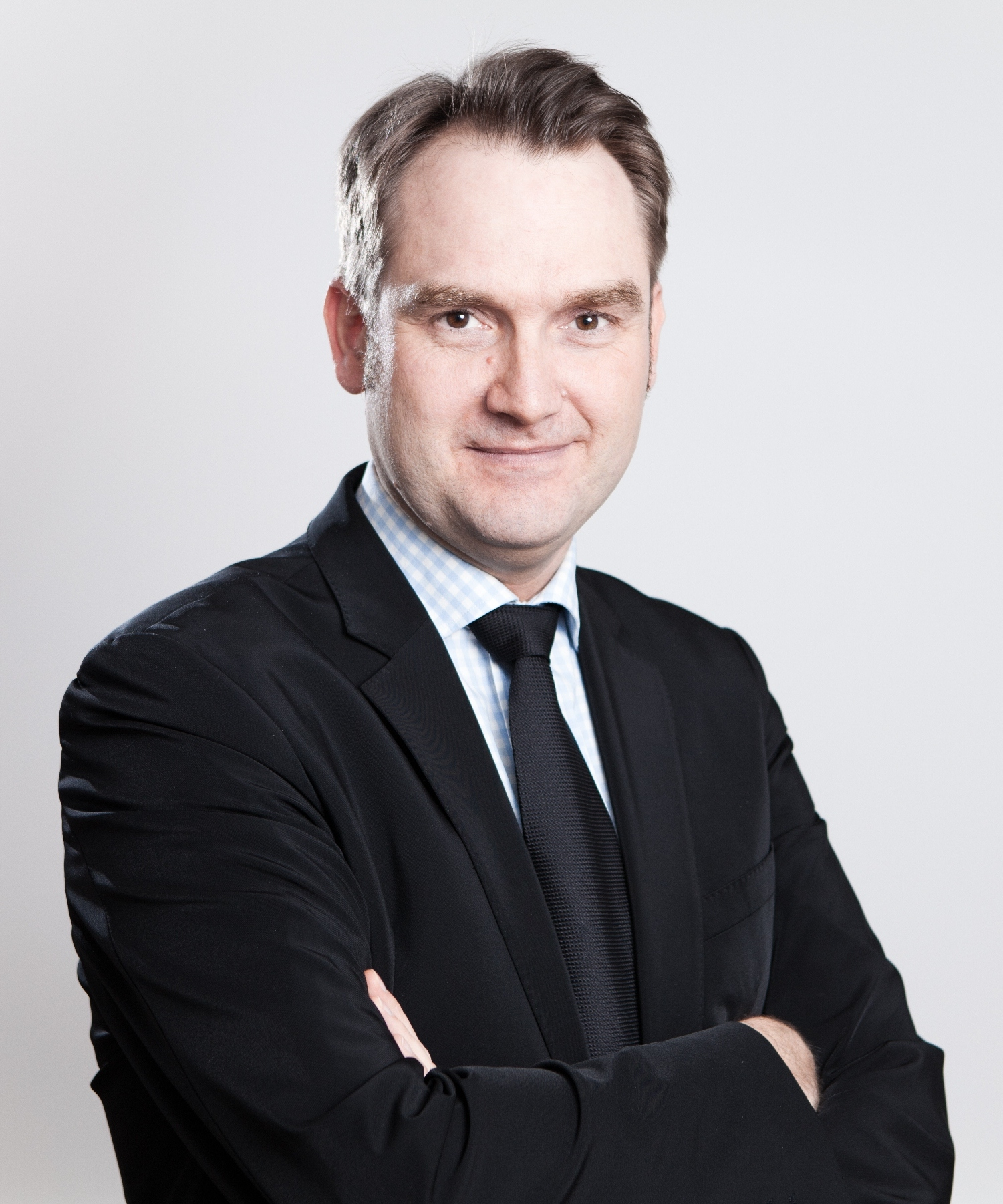
- Grün in 2013
- Born: February 13, 1969 (age 57); Mülheim an der Ruhr, Germany
- Education: RWTH Aachen University
- Occupations: Engineer; Entrepreneur
- Website: olivergruen.de/en/

Oliver Grün (born 13 February 1969, in Mülheim an der Ruhr, Germany) is a German engineer and entrepreneur. He is the founder and CEO of GRÜN Group in Aachen, since 2015 President of European Digital SME Alliance and President of the Federal Association of IT-SMEs of Germany (BITMI). From 2013 until 2024 he was a member of the Council of Advisors on Digital Economy at the Federal Ministry for Economic Affairs and Energy, which gives advice on issues concerning the digital economy.

== Early life and education ==
At RWTH Aachen University, he obtained a diploma in engineering from the RWTH Aachen University in 2001. In 2013, he graduated with a PhD in commercial information technology from the Comenius University in Bratislava.

== Career ==
Even since he began his studies in 1989, Oliver Grün has founded an IT and software company in 1989, today called GRÜN Group, which consists of the software division GRÜN Software Group, which provides industry software for specific target goups and the services division GRÜN IT Group, which provides IT services and technical services. The group employs about 500 employees with 13 branches in 5 European countries.

As CEO and president, Oliver Grün has led with the development of Bundesverband IT-Mittelstand (BITMi) in 2010. The medium-sized IT association represents the interests of medium-sized IT companies. In Computerwoche's latest list of the 100 most important German IT personalities in 2011, Oliver Grün ranked 68th. In 2016, the editorial board of the magazine Politics & Communication placed Oliver Grün on the list of the 100 most important actors in digitization in Germany.

From 2013 until 2024, Oliver Grün was principal member of the Council of Advisors on Digital Economy at the Federal Ministry for Economic Affairs and Energy in Germany. In addition, he has been president of European Digital SME Alliance since 2015.

Since 2014 he has also been a member of the Federal Economic Senate of the Federal Association Medium-Sized Enterprises. In 2016 he founded the digitalHUB Aachen e.V., whose CEO he is to this day.

From 2017 until 2020 Oliver Grün was appointed by the European Commission to the board of the Digital Skills and Jobs Coalition.
