= Thomas Bachem =

German entrepreneur, software developer and investor

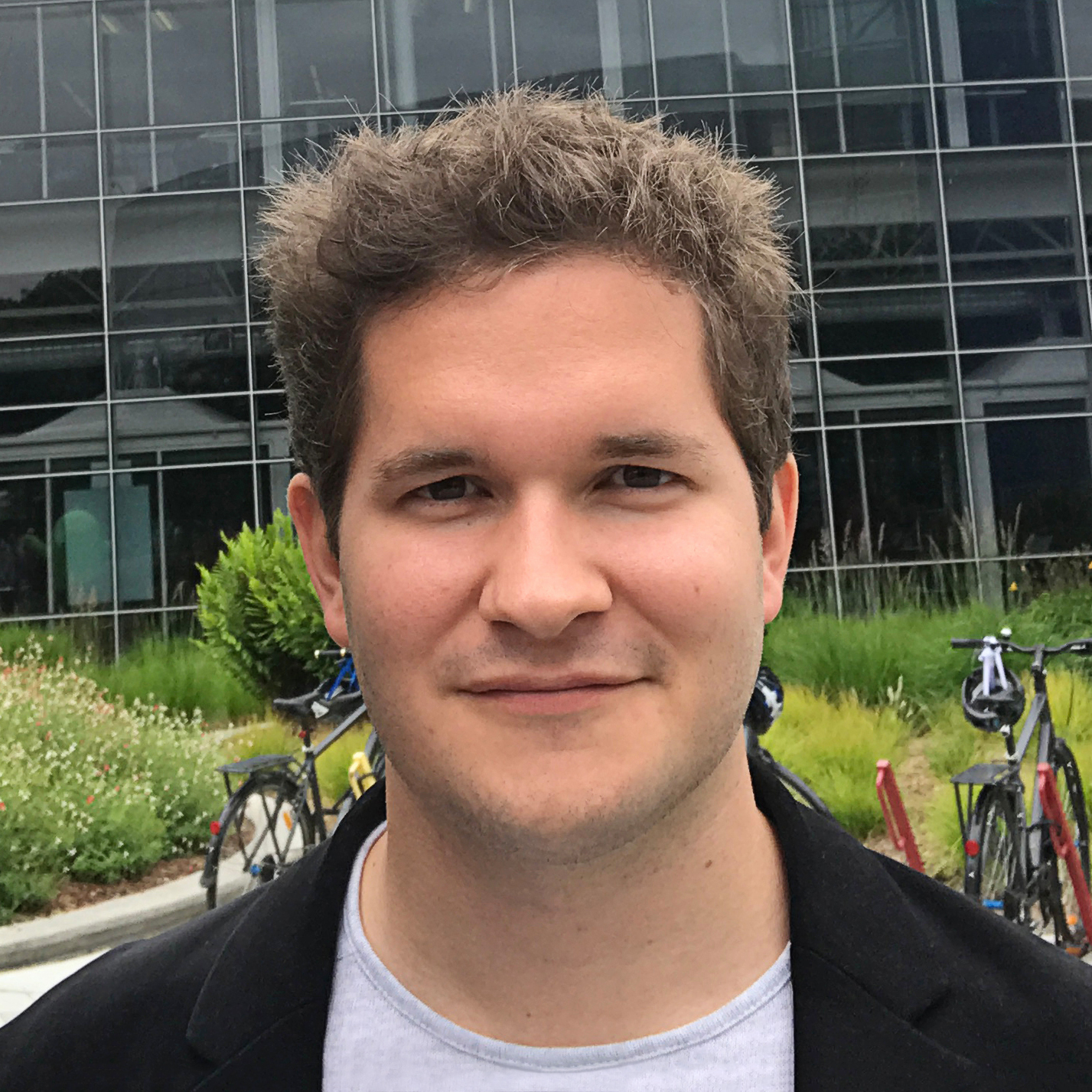
- Bachem in 2017 at the Googleplex
- Born: November 14, 1985 (age 41); Bergisch Gladbach, Germany
- Occupations: Entrepreneur and investor
- Known for: CODE University of Applied Sciences, German Startups Association, sevenload
- Website: thomasbachem.com

Thomas Bachem (born November 14, 1985) is a German entrepreneur, software developer and investor. He is founder and chancellor of the CODE University of Applied Sciences in Berlin.

== Career ==
Bachem grew up in Cologne and taught himself computer programming at the age of 12 years. As a teenager, he ran an online portal for software development and developed websites for corporate customers.

Parallel to his studies at Cologne Business School, he developed the video-sharing website sevenload in 2005, which acquired more than €25 million in venture capital while he was still a student and was sold to Hubert Burda Media in 2010. Immediately thereafter he founded United Prototype, which developed the social game Fliplife and was acquired in 2012 by German-Turkish gaming company Kaisergames. In his spare time, Bachem developed Lebenslauf.com (engl. Resume.com), an online CV editor which he sold to publicly traded XING AG in 2014.

In 2016, Bachem founded the CODE University of Applied Sciences in Berlin in an effort to improve the education of software developers since existing computer science courses appeared outdated and too theoretical to him. The accredited private university was granted state recognition by the state of Berlin in July 2017 and commenced its English-language studies in October 2017. Bachem is the youngest university chancellor in Germany.

In addition to its own entrepreneurial activities Bachem supports young startup companies as an angel investor.

== Voluntary Commitment ==
In 2012, Bachem, together with other internet entrepreneurs, founded the German Startups Association as a political voice for startups in Germany. He served as the association's Vice Chairman and continues to serve as a member of its extended board.

Bachem also initiated the non-profit Code+Design Initiative and is a senator of the German Academy of Science and Engineering. He is a long-time member of the Entrepreneurs' Organization and for many years served as a regional board chair.

== Awards ==
The German business newspaper Handelsblatt named Bachem "Founder of the Year 2017". The German magazine Capital named him in the same year as "Young Elite - Top 40 under 40" in the Society and Science category. In December 2017, the magazine Business Punk named him one of "100 Rising Stars" in its "Watchlist 2018". In August 2019, he received the "Innovators Under 35" award of the German issue of MIT Technology Review and was named "Social Innovator of the Year".

In 2010, business magazine WirtschaftsWoche included him in a list of "Berühmte deutsche Gründer", and in 2014 in a list of 25 "pioneers of the German startup scene".

The general assembly of the German Startups Association appointed him an honorary member. Under the association's bylaws, honorary membership recognizes long-standing support or exceptional contributions to the association's purpose.

In May 2025, Bachem was awarded "Impact Entrepreneur of the Year" at the German Startup Awards for his work in digital education, including founding CODE University of Applied Sciences.

The university received the "German Excellence Prize" and was named an "Excellent Place" in the annual Land of Ideas competition in 2019.
