= Ting Mobile =

Wireless service company

- Type: Subsidiary
- Industry: Wireless communications
- Founded: February 2, 2012
- Headquarters: Englewood, Colorado, U.S.
- Parent: Boost Mobile
- Website: tingmobile.com

Ting Mobile is an American mobile virtual network operator owned by Tucows. Originally established in February 2012 by Tucows, Ting provides cellular service in the United States using the Verizon network, and formerly using the T-Mobile network. The service is sold off-contract with billing that adjusts the cost of service based on actual customer usage (usage-based billing).

In August 2020, Dish Network acquired key Ting Mobile assets. As part of the agreement, Tucows will serve as the provider of backend services for Dish Network's wireless businesses.

== History ==
The company first announced support for devices that functioned on Sprint or its subsidiaries. A public beta was then launched on December 6, 2011, offering official support for seven Sprint-branded smartphones; the announcement also included links to a substantial list of other compatible devices and a new discussion area for users attempting to activate them. Ting Mobile officially launched in February 2012. In late 2014 the company expanded into the gigabit-broadband market.

On December 9, 2014, Ting Mobile announced GSM services going live in February 2015 using "a major US network provider", being the T-Mobile network. Ting customers can have phones on either network within the same account. The GSM service allows the majority of US cellphones to be brought to Ting. On February 24, 2015, Ting Mobile offered public beta access to their GSM network with the official product launched a few months later. As of March 2017, the service has approximately 250,000 subscribers. Ting Mobile gained 19,000 new customers in the first half of 2017, a bump attributed to its rival RingPlus shutting down, in part.

On July 10, 2019, Ting Mobile announced that it would not renew its network agreement with T-Mobile after December 19, 2019, citing uncertainties over its proposed merger with Sprint, and announced it would partner with Verizon. According to Business Insider, Ting "decided to switch its US service from T-Mobile to Verizon after T-Mobile faced delays in its merger with Sprint, failing to offer the promised benefits of a combined network." However, Ting then renewed its network agreement with Sprint for an additional year until September 2020, and before the start of 2020, agreed to offer T-Mobile services for at least three more years.

On August 3, 2020, key Ting Mobile assets were acquired by Dish Network, which was in the process of launching a national wireless carrier and using prepaid assets (including Boost Mobile) sold by Sprint as a condition of their 2020 merger with T-Mobile (which also includes an agreement for use of their network for seven years). As part of the agreement, Dish agreed to subcontract backend services (including provision and billing) for its wireless business to Tucows. The sale did not include the Ting branding or Ting Internet division; Dish received a two-year transitional license to the Ting branding, with the option to acquire it at a later date. In August 2020, Dish finalized the purchase of Ting Mobile from Tucows. In November 2020, Robert Currie was named head of the brand. Its plan also changed, moving away from pay-as-you-go rates.

In June 2022 Dish offered wireless services through its Ting Mobile, Boost Mobile, Republic Wireless, and Gen Mobile brands. As of September of 2022, Ting Mobile plans use the Verizon network.

On June 6, 2025, it was reported that parent company EchoStar Corporation was preparing to file for Chapter 11 bankruptcy protection after the Federal Communications Commission (FCC) suspended EchoStar's ability to plan out strategic decisions for its Boost Mobile subsidiary. In addition, other factors contributing to this decision included missing over $500 million in interest payments and the termination of the Dish Network acquisition by DirecTV.

== Business model ==
Ting's cellular business model does not subsidize phone sales or require contracts beyond month-to-month. Pricing is in separate data tiers, all of which deliver tiered voice and text.

Ting supports devices that run on T-Mobile's (GSM) and Verizon's (CDMA) cellular networks depending on the frequencies of the device. Devices can be purchased through Ting's Web site or other sellers. The customer then enters the device's electronic serial number on Ting's site to activate the device. Ting provides a device checker to advise what level of compatibility the device will have on their CDMA and GSM networks.

=== Services ===
In 2019, the company offered its service on GSM, CDMA and High Speed Packet Access (HSPA).

== See also ==
- List of mobile virtual network operators in the United States
