= Assessment day =

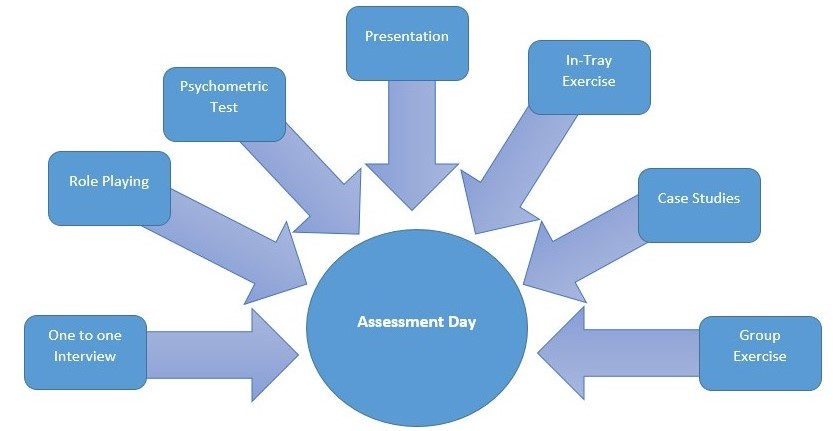
Stages involved on a typical Assessment Day

An assessment day is usually used in the context of recruitment. On this day, a group of applicants who have applied for a particular role are invited to an assessment centre, where a combination of selection techniques are used by the employers to measure the suitability of an individual for the job role. These selection technique usually include exercises such as presentation, group exercise, one to one Interview, role play, psychometric test etc. Most large organisations like banks, audit and IT firms use assessment days to recruit the fresh talent in their graduate programmes. With an increase of popularity of assessment days, several training institutes have been formed that prepare candidates for assessment days, for example, Green Turn is a famous institute that prepares candidates for assessment days of big 4 accountancy firms.

== History ==
There are several examples throughout history, but the term "Assessment" for recruiting employees was firstly used in World War II by German Army in early 1930s. They used this process to select military officers. The tasks involved certain tests and officers were rated on how well they performed and chosen for selection and promotion accordingly. Dr Simoneit, a German psychologist led the foundation of what became known as 'An Assessment' in German Army. The idea of starting this process was to get a better understanding of why certain officers did not act in the way they had said they would if they were selected or promoted.

Further psychological and scientific methods were added to his original work later on by British Government. They recognised the importance of having an assessment day and a War Office Selection was created using its own testing methods. Examples include the Admiralty Interview Board of the Royal Navy and the Board of the British Army.

AT&T created a building for recruiting staff in the 1950s. This was called The Assessment Centre and this was influential on subsequent personnel methods in other businesses.

== Purpose ==
The purpose of having an assessment day is to see how candidates actually behave when they will be put in real work life situations, for example performing an exercise with a group of people under timed conditions. These behaviours will then get compared to the key behavioural criteria which have been specified for that job role. Although the original assessment days were focused on military duties and their specific exercises are unlikely to be used in a commercial or public environment, but it is still important to know that these exercises have been designed to judge the behaviour of an individual in performing a task. Another reason of employers having an assessment day is that, assessment days have a proven track record of finding the most suitable candidates for the job. They are usually attended by a group of candidates normally between 5 and 15 all of whom are being assessed. They are usually held for a full working day and it is important to remember that the assessment day is just a way of finding candidates suitability for the role. One Candidate is not in competition with the other candidates on the assessment day. If every candidate shows the right qualities and competencies the employer is looking for they will hire all of them. If none of the candidates meet the necessary standard, the employer will hire none of them.

Assessment day is usually organised by the human resource department of the organisation. There might be other managers of the company in the assessors panel to provide technical input. Larger organisations sometimes also hire or invite their occupational psychologists on the panel to provide professional reviews on the candidate's behaviour. Occasionally, if an assessment day involves role play exercises, some companies bring professional actors to play that part to assess the behaviour of candidates. For example, to play a role of a dissatisfied client. The idea behind this is to create a real life scenario. Some candidates often prefer this idea and find it easier to behave in the way as they would do in real life. Ultimately, the purpose of employers having an assessment day is to measure how well candidates will deal with a situation that they might encounter in the job.

== Stages to undertake on Assessment Day ==
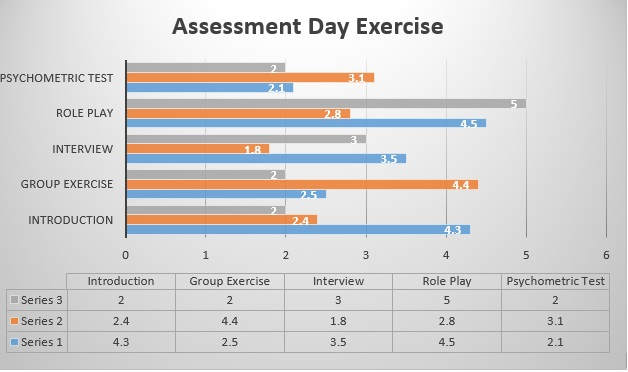
Most popular Assessment Day exercises.

Assessment Day involves a list of exercises sometimes tailored to the job role individuals have applied for. Candidates on an assessment day are assessed against a list of competencies: KSA's – Knowledge, Skills and Attitudes. On each competency a score is given and this is assessed through a number of activities as explained below:

=== Group Exercise ===
The purpose of Group exercise is to test the interpersonal and teamwork skills of an individual and usually involve activities such as debating, discussing ideas and solving a challenging problem. The idea behind these activities is to judge whether the candidate will overpower the group or fade in the background when they have to work with people with different skills set. It is important that candidates remember that they are not necessarily competing with the others in the group but everybody is performing against the company standard.

=== In-tray Exercise ===
The results of this exercise illustrate candidate's organizational and prioritizing skills. The test gives the candidates an everyday example of multiple tasks which needs to be assessed and prioritized. This tests time perception and management and gives the assessors an insight into how the candidate will react in a real-world situation. Most in-tray exercises are designed according to the job specification and they test a set of key competencies based on the values of the organization. For example, they focus on the delegation, independence and managing skills. It is vital that candidates think about the job role and competencies that employer is looking for when answering the questions.

=== Psychometric Test ===
These tests are used to measure how people differ in their motivation, values, priorities and opinions. They are helpful for employers in analysing the more hidden traits of individuals and give them indication of their preferred working style. They also give an idea to assessors of candidate's current abilities. They can be quite difficult as normally they are performed under timed conditions, therefore it is advisable for candidates to practice before their assessment day. There are many different types of psychometric test but the commonly used by the employers are numerical reasoning test and verbal reasoning test.

=== Role Play Exercise ===
A role play is designed according to the job role, it is a fictional scenario, for example, candidates may have to face an angry customer if they have applies for a sales manager role, where one of the assessor will play the part of the angry customer. In this way assessors will challenge the candidates with different cross-questions and reasons behind the answers. Some companies even hire professional actors for role play exercise so the situation will be more close to real life and also they can assess the candidate accurately.

=== Presentation ===
Presentation on an assessment day usually tests a candidates ability of how confident he is in presenting ideas in front of a group of people. Some organizations give the topic of presentation in advance that candidates have to prepare, others give the topic on the assessment day and give candidates some time to prepare for it. This demonstrates their capabilities of presenting their finding and analyzing information under timed condition.

=== One-to-One Interview ===
This is usually the last stage of assessment day, If candidates have completed all other tasks, this is an ideal opportunity for individuals to ask questions from hiring managers and showcase them their talent and impress them with the research that they have done about the company and its products and services. This is one of the most important aspects of an assessment day as assessors get to know a candidate individually and it has a great impact on the selection process.

Assessors on the assessment day only give credit for the knowledge skills and attitudes (KSA's) candidates exhibit during these exercises. They do not normally test the technical knowledge of job role. The final decision of whether to select or reject a candidate mostly depends on the competencies shown in the above activities.

== Strengths and Weaknesses ==
=== Strengths ===
Assessment Days are eminently fair and objective. They allow a broader range of selection methods to be used so therefore they are more accurate than a standard recruitment process. The tests which are used on assessment day gives an insight knowledge of applicant's psychological and social behaviour. The results from these tests, combined with other conventional sources of information plays an important role in selecting the most qualified candidate and also enables organizations in eliminating unsuitable candidates – helping the organizations to ensure that they put right people in right roles.

Assessment Days test the psychological behaviour of the person as what they can do, not what they know. It tests their ability to apply formal education in a real world situation. A person may have a first class degree but he may not be able to make critical decisions under pressure or lack skills to delegate work to his team.

Exercises and Activities involve at an assessment day are highly adaptable for all types of job roles and for all sorts of organizations. For example, can be designed for recruiting community service officers, sales assistants, detectives, IT Consultants, Audit Managers and jailers as well as police officers. Moreover, the cost associated with assessment day is usually lower as compared to the cost involve in many other recruitment processes. Because exercises involve on an assessment day are cost and time friendly and can be tailored to the budget of the organisation.

Assessment Days can also play an important role for candidates in terms of providing them with feedback about their strengths and weaknesses, which allows them to improve their skills and abilities for future roles. Assessment Days are also an ideal opportunity for candidates to understand the organisation and job role more closely and help them in making decision whether this is the right job role for them.

=== Weaknesses ===
Assessment Days can be difficult to manage and there is always an uncertainty of things going wrong on the day. There can be system failure or maybe other IT problems that can cause problems in performing various activities, for example, aptitude tests and psychometric tests can not be performed because of an immediate IT failure. Role players may fail to turn up or badly play their roles and therefore assessors may not be able to mark the exercise properly.

Furthermore, with an increase in technology people who have been to an assessment day of a company write about their experiences and nature of exercises involved on social websites and student forums which in result give all the answers to future candidates and they prepare themselves in advance which is sometimes not fair for selection process.

Sometimes, candidates complain that they feel uncomfortable on an assessment day as they are just "role playing" and assessors don't get to know "the real me". Others complain that the time spent with an assessors is too limited for them to make a right decision. Some also argue that exercises that are used for assessment days are too ambiguous and not close to job specification. Moreover, sometimes its hard for an organization to gather all their assessors and managers on the same day as the assessment process is very time-consuming as it can lasts from 4 to 7 hours.

== Strategies for Applicants ==
Applicants should follow the following strategies to succeed an assessment day:

- Research about the company, its products and services and if there is any recent news about this company before the assessment day.
- Applicants should arrive at least 15 minutes before the starting time, some organisations may want candidates to arrive even earlier so they can check their documents.
- Be polite to everyone and shake hands with everyone, even with other candidates.
- Show interest in the discussion and try to mix up with everyone, employers at an assessment day usually judge social behaviour of candidates when they interact with others.
- Try to be confident in group exercises, don't overpower the group and try to get others involved in the group discussion as it gives good impression on assessors.
- Applicants should request feedback if they have been unsuccessful so they can improve their performance for the next assessment day.
