= Gen Mobile =

American wireless service provider

- Type: Subsidiary
- Industry: Wireless telecommunications
- Founded: July 25, 2018; 8 years ago
- Founder: Robert Yap
- Products: Mobile phone, prepaid mobile phone, SIM Card, eSIM
- Services: Mobile virtual network operator, Mobile telephony
- Parent: EchoStar
- Website: www.genmobile.com

Gen Mobile is an American wireless service provider that offers prepaid mobile plans, including domestic and international calling, text messaging, and mobile broadband. Customers may pay month-to-month or qualify for discounted service through government subsidy programs such as the federal Lifeline benefit.

Gen Mobile provides nationwide 4G and 5G network coverage through both physical SIM cards and eSIMs, powered by the T-Mobile US, AT&T, and Boost Mobile cellular networks. Plans begin at $10 per month, with data and mobile hotspot capabilities varying by plan.

The company was established to expand access to wireless connectivity, particularly among underserved communities. Gen Mobile is a brand of EchoStar Corporation (NASDAQ: SATS) and is headquartered in Los Angeles, California.

== History ==
Gen Mobile was founded in February 2018 by Robert Yap and a group of fellow telecom executives in Redondo Beach, California, and officially launched on July 25, 2018. The company began as an MVNO, providing prepaid wireless services over the Sprint network.

Following the merger of Sprint Corporation and T-Mobile US in April 2020, Gen Mobile transitioned to offering service on the T-Mobile US network. Currently, Gen Mobile also provides services on the AT&T network and Boost network allowing customers the freedom to choose which network works best for them.

On September 1, 2021. Gen Mobile was acquired by DISH Wireless, which later became part of EchoStar following the 2024 merger between DISH Network and EchoStar Corporation. Gen Mobile continues to operate under its own brand in Los Angeles, California, and supports EchoStar’s efforts to expand wireless services to value-conscious and underserved consumers.

On June 29, 2026, EchoStar announced that Dish DBS, which operates Dish Network's satellite pay-TV business, as well as Sling TV, Boost Mobile, and Gen Mobile, would file for Chapter 11 bankruptcy protection by June 30. EchoStar blamed the decision on heavy debt and subscriber losses, as well as legal troubles with federal regulators on whether it has met obligations to deploy wireless spectrum licenses. On June 30, Dish DBS filed for prepackaged Chapter 11 bankruptcy in Texas, listing assets and liabilities between $10 billion and $50 billion. The filing allows for Dish to pay its debt obligations and complete the transition of Dish Wireless to Boost Mobile following spectrum transactions. Dish plans to emerge from bankruptcy by the third quarter of 2026 with plans to wind down operations at Dish Wireless. Gen Mobile is not expected to be affected by the filing and will continue operations normally.

== Services ==
=== Prepaid phone service ===
Gen Mobile offers a range of prepaid wireless plans designed for cost-conscious consumers. In response to increasing mobile data usage and international connectivity demands, the company updated its plan offerings to include additional high-speed data. It expanded international calling and roaming features without raising prices.

As of 2024, Gen Mobile's prepaid plans include the following:

$10/month – Includes unlimited calling to over 100 international destinations.

$20/month – Includes 5GB of high-speed data.

$30/month – Includes 11GB of high-speed data.

$40/month – Includes 17GB of high-speed data.

$50/month – Offers unlimited data with 45GB at high-speed and 10GB mobile hotspot allowance.

$60/month – Offers unlimited data with 45GB at high-speed and 20GB mobile hotspot allowance.

Plans priced at $20 and above include Canada roaming and Mexico roaming, which provide 500 minutes, 500 text messages, and 500MB of data per month for use while traveling in either country.

Gen Mobile's services appeal to budget-conscious individuals and families, offering flexible, no-contract month-to-month options. Customers who qualify can also apply for federal subsidies, such as the Lifeline program, to help reduce the cost of service.

=== International Call from the United States ===
Gen Mobile offers international calling as part of its prepaid wireless plans, starting at $10 per month. These plans include unlimited calls and text messages to international destinations. Service is available through both physical SIM cards and eSIMs, depending on device compatibility.

As of 2024, the unlimited calling to 100+ international destinations include:

Africa & Middle East	Asia & Pacific	Europe	North & Central America	South America & Caribbean
Algeria (L)	Bangladesh (ML)	Andorra (L)	American Samoa (ML)	Argentina (ML)
Angola (L)	Bhutan (ML)	Austria (L)	Canada (ML)	Aruba (L)
Cameroon (L)	Brunei (M)	Belgium (L)	Cayman Islands (L)	Bermuda (ML)
Egypt (L)	Cambodia (ML)	Bulgaria (L)	Costa Rica (ML)	Brazil (ML)
Israel (L)	China (ML)	Croatia (L)	Dominican Republic (L)	Chile (ML)
Kuwait (ML)	Guam (ML)	Cyprus (L)	El Salvador (L)	Colombia (ML)
Morocco (L)	Hong Kong (ML)	Czech Republic (ML)	Guatemala (L)	French Guiana (L)
Namibia (ML)	India (ML)	Estonia (L)	Mexico (ML)	Guadeloupe (ML)
Nigeria (L)	Indonesia (ML)	Faroe Islands (ML)	Panama (L)	Martinique (L)
Oman (L)	Japan (ML)	Finland (M)	Puerto Rico (ML)	Paraguay (ML)
Saudi Arabia (L)	Laos (ML)	France (ML)	St. Maarten (ML)	Peru (ML)
Turkey (L)	Macau (ML)	Germany (ML)	United States Virgin Islands (ML)	Trinidad and Tobago (L)
	Malaysia (ML)	Gibraltar (L)		Uruguay (L)
	Mongolia (ML)	Greece (ML)		Venezuela (L)
	Myanmar (L)	Greenland (L)		
	Nepal (L)	Hungary (ML)		
	Pakistan (ML)	Iceland (ML)		
	Singapore (ML)	Ireland (ML)		
	South Korea (ML)	Italy (ML)		
	Taiwan (ML)	Liechtenstein (L)		
	Thailand (ML)	Luxembourg (L)		
	Vietnam (M)	Malta (L)		
		Monaco (L)		
		Netherlands (L)		
		Norway (ML)		
		Poland (ML)		
		Portugal (L)		
		Romania (ML)		
		Russia (L)		
		San Marino (L)		
		Slovakia (L)		
		Slovenia (L)		
		Spain (ML)		
		Sweden (ML)		
		Switzerland (L)		
		Ukraine (ML)		
		United Kingdom (ML)		

=== Lifeline Program ===
Gen Mobile participates in the Lifeline Program a long-standing government initiative that provides discounted phone or internet services to qualifying low-income consumers. Administered by USAC under the oversight of the FCC, Lifeline offers monthly service discounts to eligible households. Gen Mobile offers qualifying customers in 38 states a free mobile service plan that includes 4.5 GB of high-speed data, as well as unlimited talk and text.

Eligibility for Lifeline is typically based on household income or participation in certain federal assistance programs such as the Supplemental Nutritional Assistance Program (SNAP) or Supplemental Security Income (SSI). Through its participation in Lifeline, Gen Mobile aims to increase access to essential communication services for underserved communities.

=== Enhanced Tribal Lifeline Program ===
Gen Mobile also participates in the Enhanced Tribal Lifeline program, which provides additional monthly support to qualifying residents living on federally recognized Tribal lands. This program offers increased subsidies to help reduce the cost of phone or internet services for eligible households. Gen Mobile services residents on Tribal lands across 23 states:

Northeast	Southeast	Southwest	Northwest
Michigan	Alabama	Arizona	Alaska
Minnesota	Arkansas	California	Idaho
New York	Florida	Nevada	Oregon
North Dakota	Louisiana	New Mexico	Washington
Rhode Island	South Carolina	Oklahoma	Wyoming
Wisconsin		Texas	

=== California LifeLine Program ===
Gen Mobile provides wireless service through the California LifeLine Program, a state-run public assistance program that offers discounted phone services to eligible residents. Through this program, Gen Mobile offers qualifying individuals and households a discounted smartphone along with up to 6GB of high-speed data per month. Eligibility is based on household income or participation in qualifying government assistance programs, such as CalFresh, Medi-Cal, or Supplemental Security Income (SSI). The California LifeLine program is administered by the California Public Utilities Commission (CPUC) and is designed to ensure that all Californians have access to essential communication services.

=== ACP Program ===
Gen Mobile previously participated in the Affordable Connectivity Program (ACP), a federal benefit program that provided discounted internet and mobile services to eligible low-income households. Administered by the Federal Communications Commission (FCC), the program collaborated with wireless providers such as Gen Mobile to offer monthly service discounts and a one-time device subsidy based on eligibility criteria, such as income level or participation in other government assistance programs.

The ACP officially ended in May 2024 due to a lack of continued federal funding.

== Devices ==
Gen Mobile offers a selection of unlocked new and pre-owned smartphones, including both iOS and Android devices. These phones are available for purchase directly through the company and are compatible with Gen Mobile’s physical SIM cards and eSIMs. Customers may also bring their own unlocked devices, provided they are compatible with the networks Gen Mobile supports, including those operated by T-Mobile US, AT&T, and the Boost Mobile network.

== Store locations ==
Gen Mobile services are offered through a network of authorized retail locations across the United States. These include local cellular phone stores, convenience stores, and other independent retailers that specialize in prepaid wireless services. Customers can visit these locations to purchase Gen Mobile SIM cards, compatible devices, and service plans. In addition to physical store locations, Gen Mobile products are also available online through the company's official website.
