= Christoph Gerlinger =

German venture capitalist and Internet entrepreneur

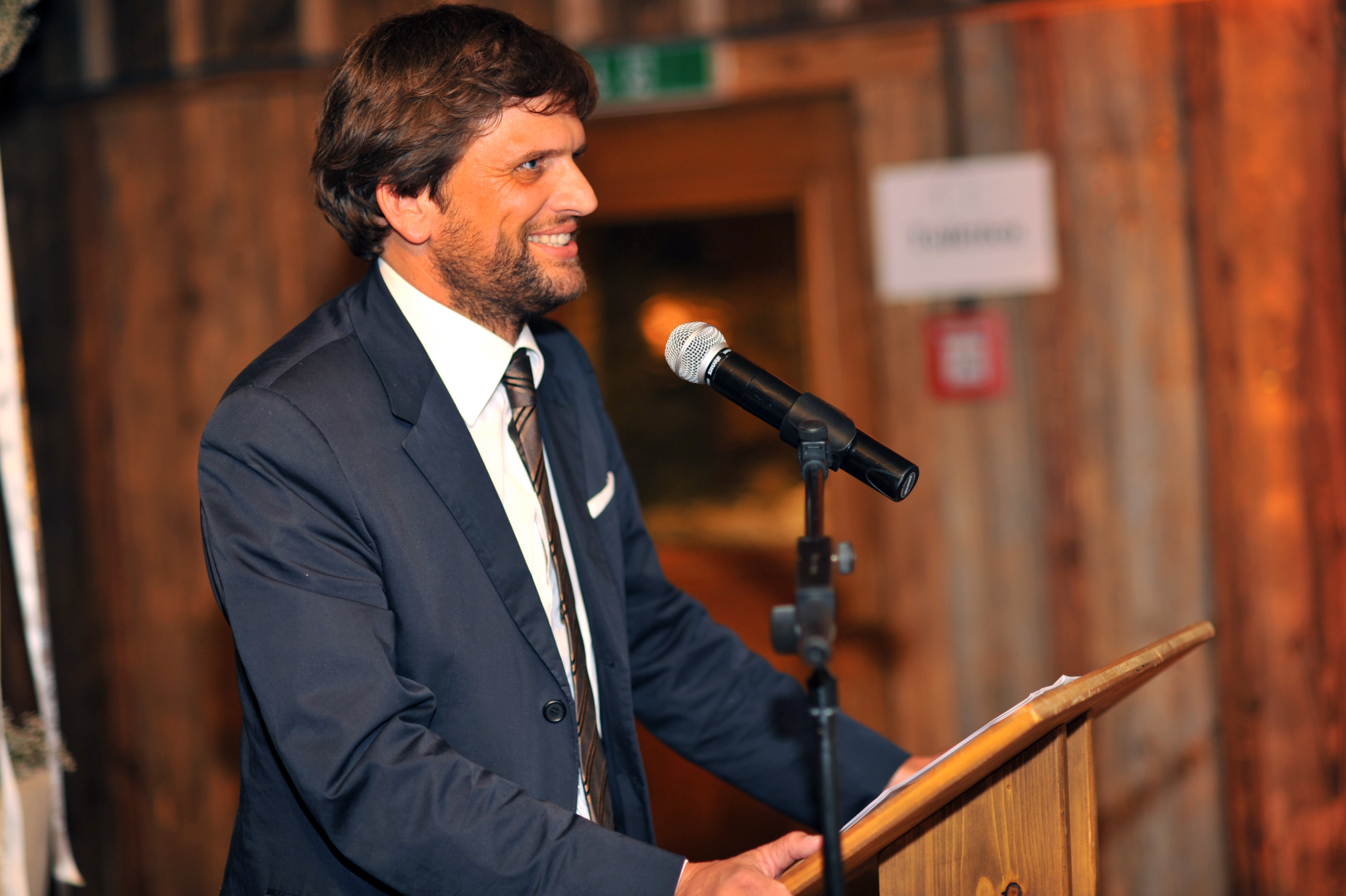
- Christoph Gerlinger, 2008
- Born: July 27, 1967 (age 59); Hessen, Frankfurt am Main, West Germany
- Education: JW Goethe University (1988 - 1992)
- Occupations: Founder and MD of The Payments Group Holding GmbH & Co. KGaA
- Known for: Founder and CEO of German Startups Group and of Frogster Interactive Pictures AG

Christoph Gerlinger (born July 27, 1967 in Frankfurt/Main, West Germany) is a German venture capitalist and internet entrepreneur. He is best known as the founder and CEO of the venture capital investment company German Startups Group, which is publicly listed on the Frankfurt Stock Exchange and was transformed in late 2020 into a Private Equity firm. In August 2024, the company was rebranded as The Payments Group Holding (PGH) and entered into a share purchase agreement to acquire four PayTech firms. The deal is expected to close in summer 2025, pending certain conditions. Once finalized, PGH will consolidate the four PayTech firms into a single group of operating companies. Prior to that he was a senior executive and entrepreneur in computer and online games companies since 1996. He was CEO of the MMO Games publisher Frogster Interactive Pictures AG (now Gameforge Berlin AG), listed at Frankfurt stock exchange from 2006 until its takeover in 2010. Gerlinger was named one of Germany's most 50 interesting young entrepreneurs by a leading German business magazine.

== Education and career ==
Gerlinger earned a master's degree in business administration and Management from JW Goethe University Frankfurt am Main in 1992.

Early in his career, Gerlinger was CFO of the German subsidiary of Psygnosis (Sony Group)(1996–1998). Later he was CFO and co-founder of CDV Software Entertainment AG (1999–2001), listed at the Frankfurt Stock Exchange from 2000 until 2010, before serving as general manager of Atari's German entity Infogrames Deutschland GmbH (2002). In early 2005, Gerlinger founded the MMO Games Publisher Frogster Interactive Pictures AG in Berlin. He was Frogster's long standing CEO and worked with the team during its critical growth phases. He left Frogster at the end of 2011 after the takeover by its competitor Gameforge. He then founded German Startups Group, which was released publicly on 27 July 2012. German Startups Group based in Berlin became the second most active venture capital investor in Germany since 2012.

In August 2020, the annual general meeting of German Startups Group resolved to merge with SGT Capital's investment management arm of the business, to create a global Alternative Investment and Private Equity Asset Manager based in Singapore and Frankfurt, The company was then renamed to SGT German Private Equity, and Gerlinger remained one of the managing directors of the company, and became a Partner, responsible for Finance and Digitalization, of SGT Capital, Private Equity business affiliated with the company.

In June 2022, SGT Capital acquired Utimaco for the funds under its umbrella. Utimac o is a global market leader for high-end cyber security software with more than 470 employees and a three-digit million revenue. This constituted the completion of the transformation of the former German Startups Group into a Germany-based Private Equity asset manager under the name SGT German Private Equity. In March 2024, SGT Capital and the company parted ways, with the company changing its focus to AI.

Gerlinger was appointed external expert of the network 'Digitalization' and a member of the digital commission by the federal board of the CDU. The Federal Ministry of Economic Affairs and Energy has appointed Christoph as an advisory board member of 'Young Digital Economy' in 2020. Gerlinger regularly publishes articles and gives interviews on venture capital and economical topics. In this capacity, he and two other members authored a position paper to support IPOs in Germany in July 2021 calling for the "disciplining of the press" to give a fair and balanced opinion, which led to fierce criticism. Due to the accusations of having the intention to restrict the freedom of the press, Gerlinger resigned from the advisory board of the 'Young Digital Economy'. In the wake of the incident, the German weekly business news magazine Wirtschaftswoche questioned Gerlinger's business practices, purporting "media critic Gerlinger must be most afraid of bad press".

In July 2021, Christoph Gerlinger faced significant controversy due to a position paper he co-authored, which called for the "disciplining of the press" to ensure balanced reporting on IPOs in Germany. This paper, published by the advisory board of the Young Digital Economy, suggested that the state should intervene to prevent what it termed "IPO and new-economy bashing" by the media. The proposal was met with widespread criticism, including from the German Journalists Association and Economics Minister Peter Altmaier, who ordered the paper's removal from the ministry's website. Gerlinger, one of the authors of the report, pitched it as a story to the German newspaper, Handelsblatt.

In response to the backlash, Gerlinger resigned from his advisory board position and issued a public apology, acknowledging the inappropriate and misleading wording in the paper. He attributed the error to a technical oversight during the document's drafting process, despite the fact that he pitched the same version to Handelsblatt, suggesting it should be covered.
