= Boost Mobile =

American telecommunications company

Boost SubscriberCo. L.L.C.
- Trade name: Boost Mobile
- Formerly: Boost Worldwide, Inc. (2001–2020)
- Type: Subsidiary
- Industry: Wireless telecommunications
- Founded: 2001; 25 years ago (as Boost Worldwide, Inc.); July 1, 2020; 6 years ago (as DISH Wireless L.L.C.); June 10, 2025; 16 months ago (as Boost SubscriberCo L.L.C.)
- Founder: Avalon Adderton; Peter Adderton; Craig Cooper; Kirt McMaster; Nextel Communications
- Headquarters: Englewood, Colorado, United States
- Key people: John Swieringa (President)
- Products: Smart phones, wireless service
- Brands: Gen Mobile
- Services: Mobile telephony; Wireless broadband
- Parent: Nextel Communications (2003–2005); Sprint Corporation (2005–2020); Dish Network (2020–2023); EchoStar (2023–present)
- Website: boostmobile.com

Boost SubscriberCo L.L.C., doing business as Boost Mobile, is an American telecommunications company and wholly owned subsidiary of EchoStar Corporation which operates as a mobile virtual network operator (MVNO) in the United States. Together with its sister brands Gen Mobile, it serves 7.51 million subscribers as of December 31, 2025.

Boost Mobile was founded as a joint venture between Avalon Adderton, Peter Adderton, Craig Cooper, Kirt McMaster, and Nextel Communications in 2001. It was purchased by Nextel in 2003 and, as a result of the merger between Sprint Corporation and Nextel, then became owned by Sprint in 2005. It was then acquired by Dish Network on July 1, 2020, following the merger between Sprint and T-Mobile. After Dish's merger with EchoStar on December 31, 2023, Boost Mobile became a subsidiary of EchoStar.

The company formerly operated a 5G network covering over 80% of the American population. However, it is no longer a facilities-based mobile network operator, having shut down its network on November 15, 2025 and instead became an MVNO hosted on AT&T's wireless network.

== History ==
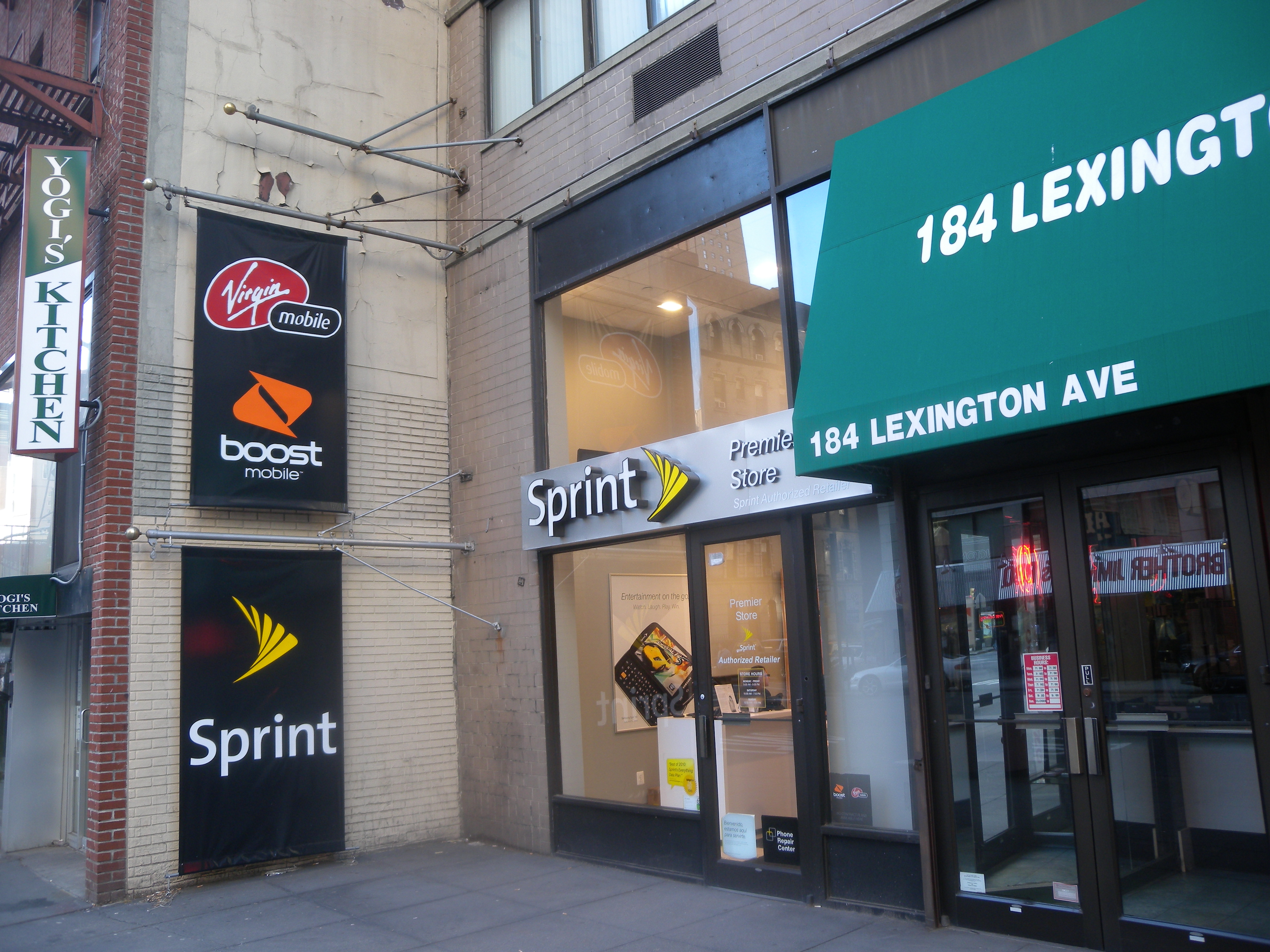
A Manhattan mobile phone store offered products and services from several Sprint-owned prepaid brands, including Boost Mobile.

=== Joint venture and Nextel ownership ===
After Peter Adderton founded Boost Mobile Australia and New Zealand in 2000, Peter Adderton, Craig Cooper, and Kirt McMaster brought the Boost Mobile brand to the United States in 2001 as a joint venture with Nextel Communications. Using Nextel's iDEN network, Boost Mobile offered an unlimited push-to-talk service, marketed as only costing a dollar a day, at a time when cellphone plans offering unlimited talk were still rare. The service was initially exclusive to markets in areas of California and Nevada and was marketed towards urban minorities, often using urban slang in advertisements. Eventually, Nextel became the sole owner of Boost's United States operations in 2003. Nextel began to expand the brand elsewhere in the United States in late 2004 after its acquisition by Sprint Corporation. Boost Mobile then became a subsidiary of the merged company, Sprint Nextel Corporation.

=== Sprint ownership ===
Boost Mobile still continued to use the previous Nextel iDEN infrastructure for its service, but in 2006, began to offer a new Unlimited by Boost Mobile service in select markets using Sprint's CDMA network, offering unlimited talk, text, and internet. While the plans resulted in significant growth for Boost Mobile, Boost did not begin shifting to CDMA entirely.

To compete with unlimited offerings from competitors in the wireless industry, Boost Mobile announced on January 15, 2009, that it would launch a Monthly Unlimited Plan. The plan was accompanied by re-focusing the brand towards a broader demographic than before. The new unlimited plan resulted in a net gain of more than 674,000 customers in about three months. Despite this lift, Nextel overall suffered a gross subscriber loss of 1.25 million contract subscriptions. The unexpected surge in popularity for the service caused significant strain on the Nextel iDEN network—as many customers reported long and sometimes week-long delays in receiving text messages. A Boost Mobile spokesman said that they did not anticipate the level of popularity for the new service and that efforts to improve the network had been implemented to help mitigate the problem.

At the 2010 Consumer Electronics Show, Boost Mobile announced it would begin to offer a new unlimited plan using Sprint's CDMA network. Sprint also acquired fellow prepaid wireless provider Virgin Mobile USA in 2010—both Boost and Virgin Mobile were re-organized into a new group within Sprint, encompassing the two brands and other no-contract phone services offered by the company.

In 2019, as part of the merger of Sprint Corporation and T-Mobile US, Sprint agreed to divest its prepaid wireless businesses, including Boost Mobile, in order to reduce antitrust concerns. In January 2020, Sprint discontinued the Virgin Mobile USA brand and transferred its customers to Boost Mobile.

=== Dish Network ownership ===
Logo used by DISH Wireless prior to its discontinuance as a brand distinct from Boost Mobile

On April 1, 2020, Sprint merged with T-Mobile; the surviving company, T-Mobile, in accordance of the terms of the merger, entered into a $1.4 billion deal to sell Boost Mobile to Dish Network. The sale was completed on July 1. All new Boost Mobile customers used the T-Mobile network, with the remaining Sprint customers to be moved to the T-Mobile network over time. As part of the deal, Dish committed to building out a 5G network serving at least 70% of the U.S. population by June 2023 and was granted access to the T-Mobile network for seven years.

To grow its wireless subscriber base, Dish acquired Ting Mobile on August 1, 2020, Republic Wireless on March 8, 2021, and Gen Mobile on September 1, 2021. On July 19, 2021, Dish Network announced it was purchasing $5 billion of wholesale wireless over the next 10 years from AT&T. In exchange, Dish shares some of its 5G spectrum with AT&T.

In December 2022, Dish launched a postpaid service under the spin-off brand Boost Infinite.

==== 2023 ransomware attack ====
In February 2023, Boost Mobile's parent company Dish Network suffered a major ransomware attack which resulted in internal outages, loss of service and data theft at its subsidiary companies. Boost Mobile customers reported that they were unable to contact customer service, cancel their subscription, or make payments. The outage affected customers across the U.S.

Service outages lasted for more than a month, with customers reporting wait times for customer service stretching to more than 14 hours. Full service was not restored until May 2023.

=== EchoStar ownership ===
On August 8, 2023, Dish Network Corporation and EchoStar Corporation announced their intention to merge. The two companies claimed that it would grant them additional resources and flexibility in deploying connectivity services. On December 31, 2023, EchoStar completed its acquisition of Dish Network, including its wireless division.

EchoStar President and CEO Hamid Akhavan promised, in May 2024, that there would be a reboot of the Boost brand in the second half of 2024. On July 17, 2024, EchoStar merged its prepaid Boost Mobile and postpaid Boost Infinite into a rebranded Boost Mobile; the company introduced new 5G unlimited plan offerings that would start at $25 per-month, and include both a 30-day money-back guarantee, and a promotion offering a price lock guarantee for postpaid subscribers.

On June 6, 2025, it was reported that EchoStar Corporation was preparing to file for Chapter 11 bankruptcy protection after the Federal Communications Commission (FCC) suspended EchoStar's ability to plan out strategic decisions for Boost Mobile.

On June 29, 2026, EchoStar announced that Dish DBS, which operates Dish Network's satellite pay-TV business, would file for Chapter 11 bankruptcy protection by June 30. EchoStar blamed the decision on heavy debt and subscriber losses, as well as legal troubles with federal regulators on whether it has met obligations to deploy wireless spectrum licenses. On June 30, Dish DBS filed for prepackaged Chapter 11 bankruptcy in Texas, listing assets and liabilities between $10 billion and $50 billion. The filing allows for Dish to pay its debt obligations and complete the transition of Dish Wireless to Boost Mobile following spectrum transactions. Dish plans to emerge from bankruptcy by the third quarter of 2026 with plans to wind down operations at Dish Wireless. Boost Mobile is not apart of the filing and will continue operations normally.

Echostar closed the sale of a large portion of its spectrum to AT&T on July 28th, 2026.

== Network ==
Dish Network began building a nationwide 5G wireless network as part of the company's strategy to expand its services beyond satellite television. After acquiring Boost Mobile, Dish began building out a standalone 5G network, that does not rely on any LTE infrastructure.

In May 2022, Dish began to launch its 5G network, offering service under the "Project Genesis" brand in Las Vegas. The company stated that it planned to serve at least 120 cities by the June 2023 deadline. In June 2022, Dish announced it had met the FCC mandate to provide coverage to 20% of the U.S. population. In June 2023, the company announced that it had met the requirement to provide coverage to 70% of the U.S. population by June 14, 2023.

As part of EchoStar's rebranding of Boost Mobile, it began referring to its 5G wireless network as the "Boost Mobile Network" and discontinued its usage of the Dish Wireless brand.

On September 18, 2024, EchoStar requested an extension for the final construction deadlines associated with several of its AWS-4, AWS-3, H Block, 700 MHz, and 600 MHz spectrum licenses until December 31, 2026, with further provisions for extension until June 14, 2028, if certain commitments are met. EchoStar committed to expand its nationwide 5G coverage to 80% of the U.S. population by December 31, 2024, and accelerate and expand its final buildout milestones in more than 500 license areas. The company promised to offer a nationwide low-cost 5G plan offering 30 GB for $25 per month and a low-cost 5G device costing $125, and it offered to increase the number of 5G towers to 24,000 by mid-2025 and allow small carriers and tribal nations to lease its unused spectrum. EchoStar announced that the FCC granted the 5G buildout framework for the Boost Mobile Network on September 20, 2024.

On August 26, 2025, Echostar announced that it had struck a deal with AT&T to sell all of the company's 3.45 GHz and 600 MHz spectrum licenses. The companies also amended their network services agreement to turn Boost Mobile into a hybrid mobile network operator (MNO), making AT&T the main network for Boost customers to resolve the FCC's inquiries into the Echostar's spectrum utilization. Echostar assurred customers that they will also continue to have access to the T-Mobile network. As a result of this transaction, elements of Boost Mobile's radio access network (RAN) will be decommissioned over time.

=== Network shutdown ===
On November 15, 2025, EchoStar shut down its wireless network and became an MVNO hosted on AT&T's mobile network.

=== Radio frequency spectrum chart ===
The following is a list of known frequencies that Boost Mobile employed or planned to employ in the United States prior to shutting down its network in November 2025.

Frequencies on the Boost Mobile Network
Frequency Band	Band number	Protocol	Generation	Status	Notes
600 MHz DD	n71	NR	5G	Decommissioned/Sold	Network launched in trial in November 2020. Licenses cover 100% of the continental United States. Sold to AT&T.
700 MHz Lower SMH Block E	n29	NR	5G	Decommissioned/Sold	Supplemental downlink only.
1.7/2.1 GHz AWS	n66	NR	5G	Decommissioned/Sold	Combination of EchoStar's unpaired AWS-3, PCS-H, and AWS-4 holdings. To be sold to SpaceX.
1.7/2.1 GHz AWS	n70	NR	5G	Decommissioned/Sold	Combination of EchoStar's unpaired AWS-3, PCS-H, and AWS-4 holdings. To be sold to SpaceX.
3.4 GHz C-band	n77	NR	5G	Sold	Licenses cover 100% of the continental United States. Spectrum acquired in 2021 auction. Sold to AT&T.
3.5 GHz CBRS	n48	NR	5G	Cancelled	Licenses cover 100% of the continental United States.
3.7 GHz C-band	n77	NR	5G	Cancelled	Spectrum will be available for use starting December 2023.
24 GHz K-Band	n258	NR	5G	Cancelled	Spectrum acquired in 2019 auction
28 GHz Ka-Band	n261	NR	5G	Cancelled	Spectrum acquired in 2019 auction
39 GHz Ka-Band	n260	NR	5G	Cancelled	Spectrum acquired in 2020 auction.
47 GHz V-Band	n262	NR	5G	Cancelled	Licenses cover 100% of the continental United States.

== Released phones ==
In June 2010, Boost Mobile launched the Motorola i1 smartphone, Boost's first iDEN-based push-to-talk Android phone, and in April 2011, they announced the Samsung Galaxy Prevail, the company's first CDMA-based Android offering.

In July 2012, Boost Mobile released the BlackBerry Curve 9310, and in March 2013, they released the HTC One SV and the ZTE-made Boost Force smartphone, the company's first device using Sprint's 4G LTE network. In June that year, Boost Mobile released the LG Optimus F7, the company's first device with a removable Universal Integrated Circuit Card (UICC) for LTE network authentication/access, a new form of Subscriber identity module (SIM card).

In December 2014, Boost Mobile released the Lumia 635, its first smartphone using Microsoft's Windows Phone mobile operating system, and in July 2015, they launched the NETGEAR Fuse along with no-contract Wi-Fi Hotspot plans, its first Mobile Wi-Fi Hotspot device.

== Marketing ==
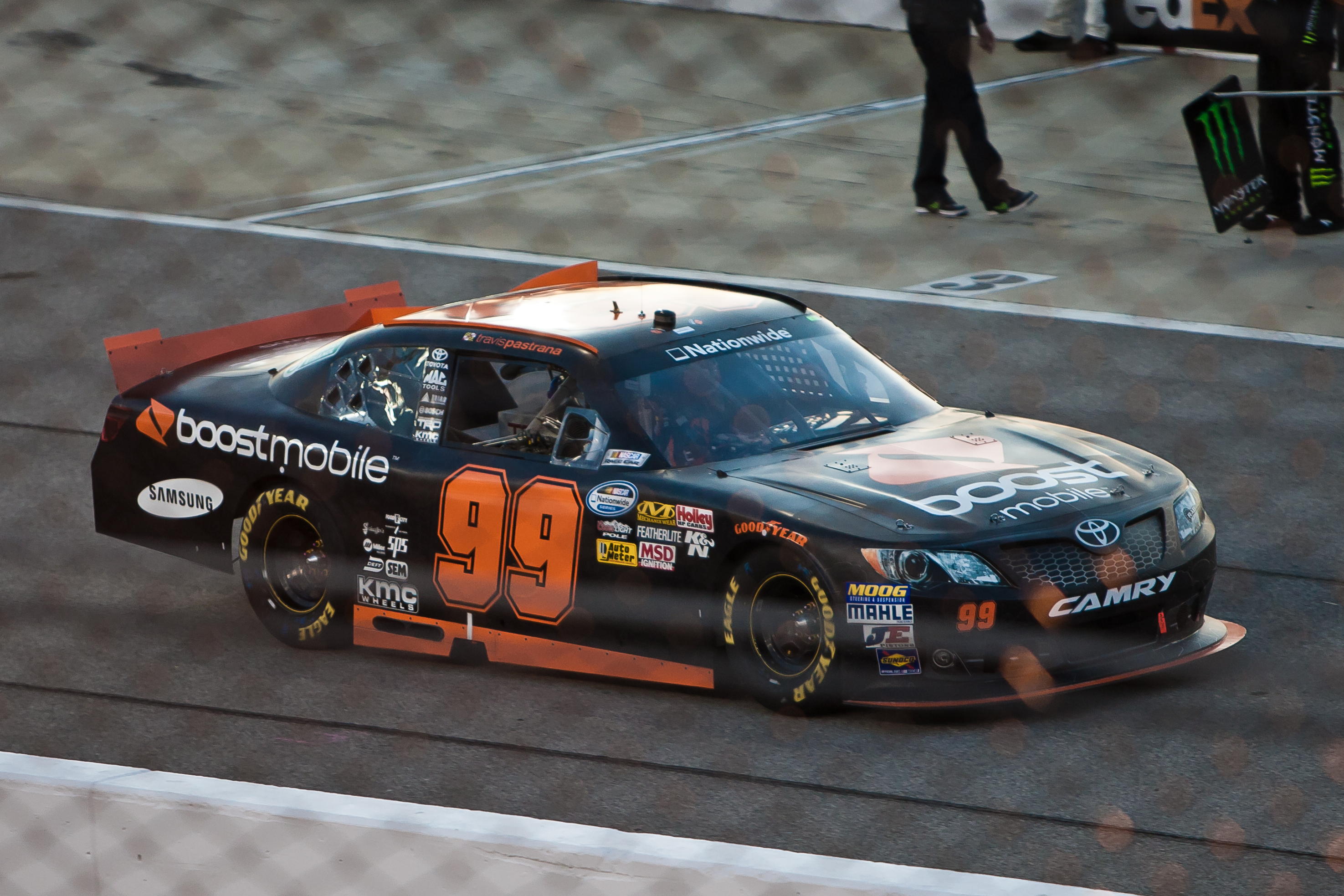
The Boost Mobile-sponsored NASCAR stock car of Travis Pastrana in 2012

The Boost Mobile brand was initially marketed to the teen and young adult demographics, heavily focused on action sports, lifestyle and urban music. Boost Mobile's past American advertising campaigns featured Los Rakas, Terry Kennedy, Kanye West, Ludacris, and The Game, and used the slang slogan "Where you at?" In late 2007, a Boost Mobile commercial with Young Jeezy, Jermaine Dupri, and Mickey Avalon was released. The "Where you at?" slogan referenced the walkie-talkie feature on all Boost Mobile phones and later evolved to highlight a social GPS application that was available on selected Boost Mobile phones. Boost have also used Indy Car driver Danica Patrick in a commercial. A 2005 episode of Adult Swim's Aqua Teen Hunger Force titled Boost Mobile was an early example of native advertising within a regular television series.

Logo used by Boost Mobile from 2008 to 2020. It was brought back on August 30, 2023.

Boost Mobile has also produced some regional campaigns, including providing live paper shredders at bus stops in Chicago and Boston, where several times an hour sample contracts from competing wireless service providers would be shredded into confetti.

Logo used by Boost Mobile following acquisition by Dish from July 1, 2020, until August 29, 2023. The previous logo returned on August 30, 2023, before being replaced by the current logo on July 17, 2024.

On January 20, 2010, Boost Mobile's then-parent company Sprint Nextel managed to secure some of the 1985 Chicago Bears players (including Jim McMahon, Willie Gault, and Mike Singletary) to re-create the team's famous "Super Bowl Shuffle" rap song and music video as "The Boost Mobile Shuffle" during the first quarter of the Super Bowl XLIV.

Boost Mobile debuted a television campaign in June 2012 to promote the HTC EVO Design 4G, its first smartphone using Sprint's 4G WiMAX network. The ads feature comedian Faizon Love as the "4Genie", a genie who magically appears where cellphone users seek low-cost 4G.

On July 1, 2021, the first day on which NCAA student-athletes were allowed to receive compensation for the use of their name, image, and likeness (NIL), Boost announced that it had signed Haley and Hanna Cavinder, twin basketball players at Fresno State with a social media following in the millions, as spokespersons.

== Services ==
=== Affordable Connectivity Program ===
Boost Mobile participated in the Affordable Connectivity Program (ACP), providing affordable connectivity and mobile services to eligible households. Through the Affordable Connectivity Program, participants received a discount on Boost Mobile phone or mobile broadband plans. The program collaborated with wireless carriers, like Boost Mobile, to offer payment assistance based on income and provide a one-time device subsidy. The ACP was a federal government program operated by the Federal Communications Commission (FCC) until it lost funding in 2024.
