= Bundesverband Deutsche Startups =

German Startups Association
- Bundesverband Deutsche Startups
- Formation: 10 September 2012; 14 years ago
- Founder: Thomas Bachem, David Hanf, Erik Heinelt, Florian Nöll
- Headquarters: Berlin, Germany
- Members: 1200 (2026)
- Secretary General: Mirco Dragowski
- Chairman: Florian Nöll
- Vice Chairmen: Thomas Bachem, Sascha Schubert
- Members of the Board: David Hanf, Sonja Jost, Dr. Tom Kirschbaum, Janina Mütze, Stephanie Renda, Adrian Thoma, Roy Uhlmann, Dorothea Utzt, Christian Vollmann
- Staff: 20 (2017)
- Website: http://germanstartups.org

The Bundesverband Deutsche Startups (German Startups Association) is a membership corporation (“Eingetragener Verein”) based in Berlin and an association of the German startup industry. It was founded in 2012 to represent and function as a voice of startups vis-à-vis politics, civil society and the established economy. The association is committed to a founder-friendly Germany, promotes innovative entrepreneurship and wants to carry the startup mentality into society. As a network, the Federal Association of German Startups connects founders, startups and their networks.

== Founding ==
The Bundesverband Deutsche Startups was founded in September 2012 by 18 startup entrepreneurs with the aim to establish an association as the political representation of startups in Germany. The concrete reason for the foundation was the Bundesrat's plans for an "anti-angel law" that was supposed to tax free-float dividends. In 2015, the association had already grown to over 500 members. Today, the association has about 1200 member companies. In addition, the Bundesverband Deutsche Startups also owns 36 student initiation initiatives. More than 20 full-time employees work at the Berlin headquarters.

== Structure ==
The association is organized nationwide and is divided into 13 regional groups. These are supplemented by 24 specialist groups on various topics such as HR, FinTech or Future Mobility. Gründermagnet e.V. has been the representation of the student start-up initiatives in Germany since 2013 and is also part of the association.

== Work ==
The Bundesverband Deutsche Startups organizes numerous events every year, addressing startups in various stages. Amongst others the Startup Camp Berlin, with over 1,000 participants and more than 150 speakers, is the largest early stage conference in Germany. Other regular events include ExitCon and the Growth Company Forum.

In addition, the association organizes various delegation trips, which are regularly attended by federal ministers, such as the German-Israel Week. In 2019, the program enabled participants to visit Silicon Wadi and Israeli startups, including IronSource, eToro, Orcam, OurCrowd, Startup Nation Central.

The association publishes its political goals in its Deutsche Startup Agenda, which was last renewed in June 2017. More than 100 startups were involved in creating the program. As the only German digital association, the Bundesverband Deutsche Startups is in favor of net neutrality.

== German-Israeli-Startup-Exchange-Program (GISEP) ==
With the aim of promoting German-Israeli economic relations in the field of startups, the Bundesverband Deutsche Startups initiated the German Israeli Startup Exchange Program (GISEP) in September 2016. The GISEP is supported by the German Federal Ministry of Economic Affairs and Energy (BMWi).

The GISEP serves as an impartial first point of contact and neutral facilitator of business contacts and opportunities between both countries. In that function, the GISEP responds to ad-hoc enquiries, but also organizes independent events.

The GISEP has been included in the BMWi's innovation agenda in April 2017.

== German Startup Monitor (DSM) ==
The Bundesverband Deutsche Startups annually publishes the German Startup Monitor (DSM) and the European Startup Monitor (ESM) on the startup ecosystem in Germany and Europe. The main aims are to present the development and significance of startups, to outline economic initiatives to strengthen the foundation location Germany and its regional ecosystems, as well as to cultivate enthusiasm for entrepreneurship.

The DSM and ESM consider ventures that are 1) younger than ten years, 2) feature innovative technologies and/or business models, and 3) have or strive for a significant employee and/or sales growth as a startup.

All founders, as well as members of the executives of German startups could participate in the online survey for the DSM. To access the survey, they received a special link via e-mail, which was solely spread through 298 selected DSM network partners (DSM 2016: 105, DSM 2015: 83; DSM 2014: 64; DSM 2013: 10). The total number of the high quality data sets continuously rose from 454 (DSM 2013), 903 (DSM 2014), 1061 (DSM 2015) and 1224 (DSM 2016) to 1837 Startups in the DSM 2017.

The DSM is currently considered the most important study on startups in Germany, since it takes up current developments in the startup industry, such as the stronger regionalization, documented by data. Both DSM and ESM are listed in the German National Library of Economics of the Leibniz Information Center for Economics.

== Successes ==
The Bundesverband Deutsche Startups's successes include the end of the planned anti-angel legislation, securing the holding privilege in angel investments and the introduction of the new market segment "Scale" for startups at the Deutsche Börse (German stock exchange). In addition, the association played a role in the expansion of the investment subsidy venture capital and in the evaluation of the Small Investor Protection Act ("Kleinanlegerschutzgesetz").
