= German Startups Group =

Venture capital provider

German Startups Group VC GmbH
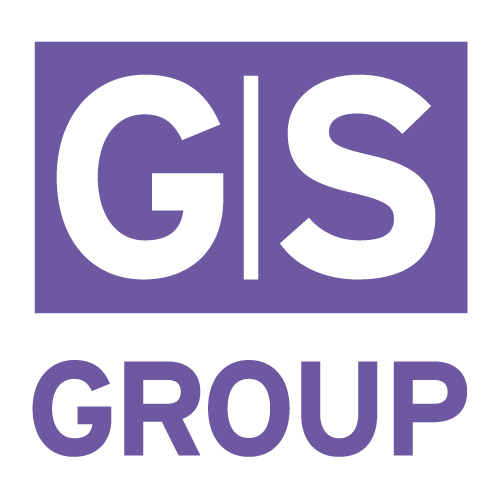
- Company type: Public
- Traded as: FWB: PGH
- ISIN: DE000A1MMEV4
- Industry: Venture Capital
- Founded: May, 2012
- Founder: Christoph Gerlinger
- Headquarters: Frankfurt, Germany
- Key people: Christoph Gerlinger (Chief Executive Officer)
- Products: Investments
- Website: german-startups.com

German Startups Group VC GmbH is a venture capital provider that supports the set-up, development, funding, and – at the appropriate time – exit of young growth companies by providing them with business expertise and venture capital to create shareholder value. Since the second half of 2013, German Startups Group also engages in acquiring secondary shares from founders and business angels. German Startups Group was founded by Christoph Gerlinger in May 2012. The operating business was launched in June 2012, and the public release was on 27 July 2012.

German Startups Group went public on 11 November 2015 and became listed on the Frankfurt Stock Exchange.

== Holdings ==
As of 10 May 2018, German Startups Group considers 20 of their 37 minority stakeholdings in operationally active companies to be of particular significance to the group. Together they comprise 89% of all 37 active minority stakeholdings.
