= Strickland (surname) =

Strickland is an English toponymic surname derived from the manor of Strickland in the historical county of Westmorland, now Cumbria, England, represented geographically by the modern villages of Great Strickland and Little Strickland. The surname dates as far back as the 12th century in Westmorland, and is also found at an early date in the Scottish counties of Ayrshire and Lanarkshire.

== Etymology ==
The surname Strickland (early forms include Stirkeland) is derived from the place-name Stercaland, given to a manor in the former county of Westmorland near Penrith, Cumbria. The place-name is Old English, from stirc, styr(i)c or steorc bullock, and land, a piece of land or pasture.

== History ==
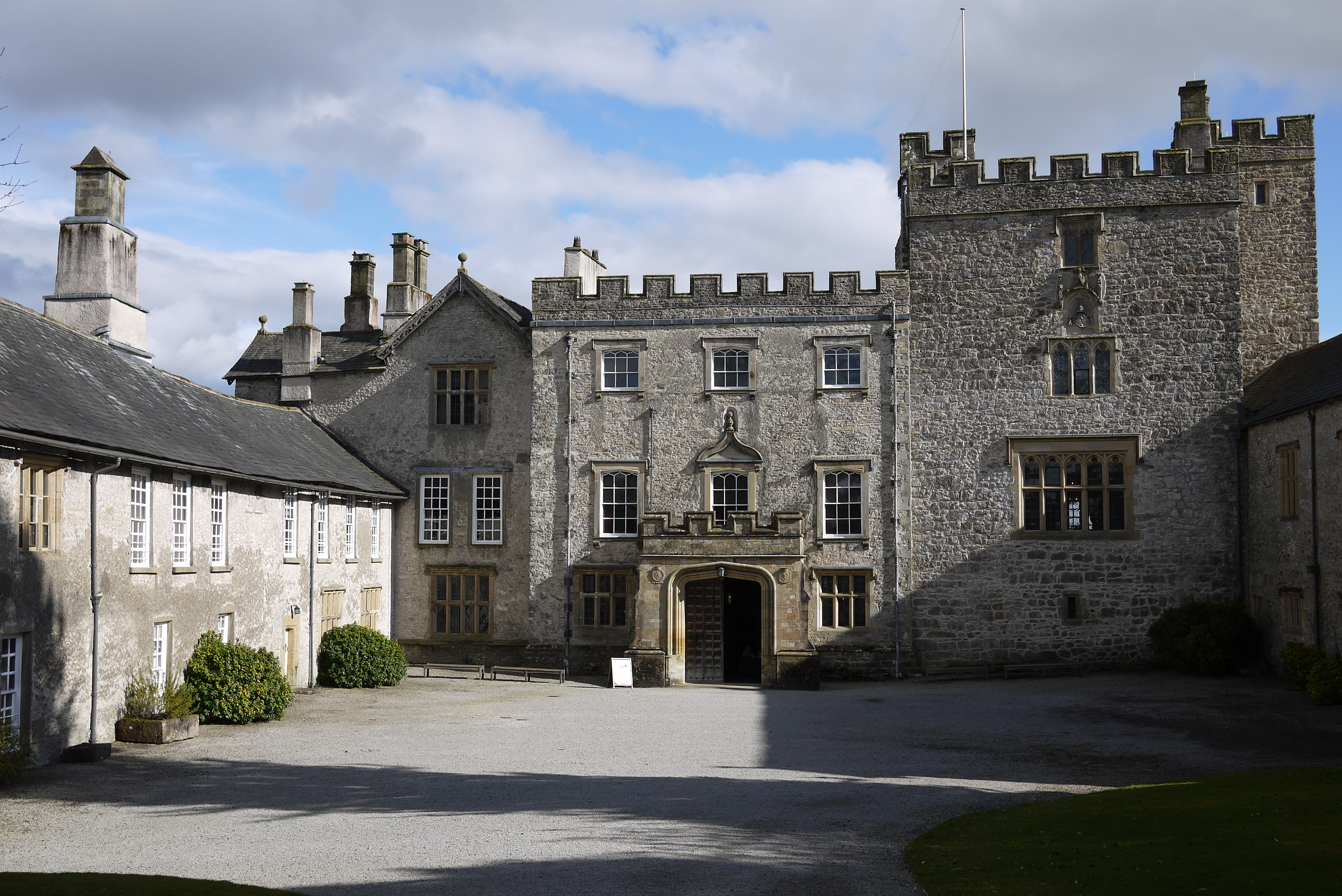
Sizergh Castle, built c. 1350, is the Strickland family seat

Coat of Arms of Strickland of Gilsland: Sable, three escallops argent

The earliest known Strickland was a late-12th century landholder named Walter of Castlecarrock, who married Christian of Letheringham, an heiress to the landed estate that covered the area where the villages of Great Strickland and Little Strickland are now. After this marriage Walter became known as Walter de Strickland, spelt in various ways.

When Sir William de Stirkeland (1242–1305) married Elizabeth Deincourt (or d'Eyncourt), Sizergh Castle became the seat of this Strickland gentry family. A descendant, Thomas Strykeland is said to have carried the banner of St. George at the Battle of Agincourt in 1415. They also had a family chapel in the Kendal Parish Church (Holy Trinity), and both Kendal and Penrith have main roads called Stricklandgate (The 'gate' element is from Old Norse gata, street). Other local landmarks include Strickland Wood, Warton near Carnforth.

They also gave their name to one of their properties, a settlement that first appeared on the west side of present-day Kendal with a motte-and-bailey fortification on it that became known as Kirkbie Strickland (Kirkbie is from Old Norse Kirkju, church, and by, village.).

A Strickland gentry family seated at Gilsland was granted a coat of arms blazoned: Sable, three escallops argent, meaning "three white scallops on a black field".

== List of persons with the surname Strickland ==
=== A ===
- Agnes Strickland (1796–1874), English historical writer and poet
- Alan Strickland (born 1984), British politician
- Alice Harrell Strickland (1859–1947), American politician and activist
- Amzie Strickland (1919–2006), American TV and radio actress
- Arumaki Strickland (died 1971), Cook Islands businessman and politician in Niue
- Audra Strickland (born 1974), American politician

=== B ===
- Barry Strickland (1923–1968), Canadian politician
- Bill Strickland (born 1947), American community leader, author, and CEO
- Bill Strickland (footballer, born 1864) (1864–1959), Australian rules football player and coach for Collingwood
- Bill Strickland (footballer, born 1882) (1882–1958), Australian rules football player for Carlton
- Bill Strickland (American football) (1898–1976), American football player
- Bill Strickland (baseball) (1908–2000), American Major League pitcher
- Bill Strickland (writer) (born 1964), American author and journalist primarily focused on cycling
- Bob Strickland (1932–2008), American reporter, journalist and news anchor
- Bonnie Strickland (born 1936), American psychologist
- Brad Strickland (born 1947), American writer
- Brian Strickland (born 1983), American politician

=== C ===
- Carol Strickland (born 1946), American art historian
- Catharine Parr Strickland, married name Catharine Parr Traill (1802–1899), emigrant from England to Canada
- Cecily Strickland (born 1959), Canadian judge
- Sir Charles Strickland, 8th Baronet (1819–1909), barrister and rower
- Charles H. Strickland (1916–1988), general superintendent in the Church of the Nazarene
- Charles Strickland (town planner) (fl. 1860), local agent and town planner in County Mayo for Lord Dillon
- C. F. Strickland (1881–1962), British colonial administrator
- Colin Strickland (born 1986), American bicycle racer

=== D ===
- Daniel Strickland (born 1979), Australian rugby league footballer
- Dave Strickland (1877–1963), Australian rules footballer
- David Strickland (1969–1999), American actor
- Dennis Strickland (born 1957), American stock car racing driver
- Derek Strickland (born 1959), Scottish footballer
- Donald Strickland (born 1980), American football player
- Donna Strickland (born 1959), Canadian physicist, 2018 Nobel laureate

=== E ===
- Earl Strickland (born 1961), American pool player
- Edeline Strickland (1870–1918), New South Wales Red Cross head
- Edgar Harold Strickland (1889–1962), English entomologist
- Sir Edward Strickland (1820–1889), British Army officer
- Erick Strickland (born 1973), American basketball player

=== F ===
- Frances Strickland (born 1941), American educational psychologist
- Fred Strickland (born 1966), American football player
- Frederick G. Strickland, American Christian socialist

=== G ===
- Gail Strickland (born 1947), American film and television actress
- George Strickland (baseball) (1926–2010), American baseball player and manager
- Sir George Strickland, 7th Baronet (1782–1874), English politician
- George Strickland (politician) (1942–2019), member of the Western Australian Legislative Assembly
- Gerald Strickland, 1st Baron Strickland (1861–1940), Maltese and British politician and peer
- Glassie Strickland (1894–1966), Cook Islands missionary, businessman and politician

=== H ===
- Hardy Strickland (1818–1884), American Confederate politician
- Harry Strickland (1903–1971), Australian politician
- Sir Henry Strickland-Constable, 10th Baronet (1900–1975), English composer
- Hugh Edwin Strickland (1811–1853), British naturalist
- Hunter Strickland (born 1988), American baseball player

=== J ===
- James Fordyce Strickland, Canadian politician
- Jane Margaret Strickland (1800–1888), British writer
- Jim Strickland (baseball) (born 1946), American baseball player
- Jim Strickland (politician) (born 1963), mayor of Memphis, Tennessee
- Joey Strickland (fl.1960s–2010s), U.S. Army colonel
- John Strickland, British film and television director
- John Strickland (basketball) (1970–2010), American basketball player
- John Estmond Strickland (fl. 1970s–2000s), UK-born banker
- Joseph Strickland (born 1958), American prelate of the Catholic Church
- Josh Strickland (born 1983), American singer and actor

=== K ===
- KaDee Strickland (born 1975), American actress
- Keith Strickland (born 1953), American musician
- Kevin Strickland (born 1959), American exonerated in a case of wrongful conviction
- Kura Strickland (1929–2014), Cook Islands politician

=== L ===
- Larry Strickland (1931–1979), American football player
- Larry C. Strickland (born 1955), American politician
- Len Strickland (1880–1949), Australian rules footballer
- Leon Strickland (born 1982), Jamaican football player
- Lily Strickland (1884–1958), American composer, painter and writer
- Lloyd Strickland (born 1973), British philosopher and intellectual historian
- Loren Strickland (born 2000), American football player

=== M ===
- Mabel Strickland (1899–1988), Anglo-Maltese journalist and politician
- Mama Tere Strickland (1963–2012), New Zealand transgender woman
- Mana Strickland (1918–1996), Cook Island educator and politician
- Marcus Strickland (born 1979), American jazz saxophonist
- Margaret Strickland (judge) (born 1980), American judge
- Margaret Strickland (writer) (c. 1880–1970), English writer for adults and children
- Marilyn Strickland (born 1962), American politician
- Mark Strickland (born 1970), American basketball player
- Martha Strickland Clark (née Strickland; 1853–1935), American lawyer
- Marshall Strickland (born 1983), American basketball player
- Michael Strickland (British Army officer) (1913–1982), British military adviser to the King of Jordan
- Michael Strickland (physicist) (born 1969), American theoretical physicist
- Michael Strickland (blogger) (born 1980), American conservative blogger
- Mike Strickland (born 1951), Canadian football player

=== N ===
- Napoleon Strickland (1919–2001), American fife and drum blues artist

=== O ===
- Obed F. Strickland (1833–1887), justice of the Supreme Court of the Utah Territory
- Ora L. Strickland, American nursing academic

=== P ===
- Paul Strickland, American storyteller and comedian
- Pete Strickland (born 1957), American basketball coach
- Peter Strickland (director) (born 1973), British filmmaker
- Peter Strickland (British Army officer) (1869–1951), World War One general
- Peter Strickland (music executive), American music executive

=== R ===
- Randolph Strickland (1823–1880), American politician
- Reggie Strickland (born 1968), American boxer
- Rennard Strickland, American jurist
- Rob Strickland, American technology executive
- Robert Strickland (1600–1671), English landowner, politician and soldier
- Rod Strickland (born 1966), American basketball player and coach
- Roger Strickland (1640–1717), English admiral and politician
- Roger Strickland (basketball) (1940–2011), American basketball player
- Ron Strickland (born 1943), American conservationist
- Roy C. Strickland (1942–2010), American politician/businessman

=== S ===
- Scott Strickland (born 1976), American baseball pitcher
- Sean Strickland (born 1991), American mixed martial artist
- Shirley Strickland (1925–2004), Australian athlete
- Stan Strickland (fl. 1970s–2020s), American musician
- Stephanie Strickland (born 1942), American poet
- Swerve Strickland (born 1990), American professional wrestler
- Susanna Moodie (née Strickland; 1803–1885), UK-born Canadian author

=== T ===
- Ted Strickland (born 1941), American politician
- Ted L. Strickland (1932–2012), American politician
- Terry A. D. Strickland (born 1992), American convicted murderer and fugitive
- Thomas de Strickland (1367–1455), English soldier
- Thomas Strickland (Cavalier) (1621–1694), English politician and soldier
- Sir Thomas Strickland, 2nd Baronet (c.1639–1684), English politician
- Thomas John Francis Strickland (c.1682–1740), English Roman Catholic bishop of Namur
- Tim Strickland (born 1977), Canadian football player
- Tom Strickland (born 1952), American lawyer and politician
- Tony Strickland (born 1970), American politician
- Tyler Strickland, American film and television composer

=== U ===
- Uriah Strickland (1907–1976), Canadian politician and master mariner

=== V ===
- Vernon E. Strickland (born 1938), American Episcopal bishop

=== W ===
- Walter Strickland (c.1598–1671), English politician and diplomat
- Walter Strickland (died 1569), MP for Westmorland
- Walter Strickland, 9th Baronet (1851–1938), English translator and radical
- Walter Strickland (architect) (1841–1915), Canadian architect
- Walter G. Strickland (1850–1928), English art historian and bibliographer
- William Strickland (bishop) (died 1419), English clergyman
- William Strickland (navigator) (died 1598), credited with introducing the turkey to England, later a Member of Parliament
- Sir William Strickland, 1st Baronet (c. 1596–1673), Member of Parliament during the English Civil War
- Sir William Strickland, 3rd Baronet (1665–1724), Member of Parliament for Yorkshire
- Sir William Strickland, 4th Baronet (c. 1686–1735), British statesman
- William Strickland (farmer) (1753–1834), gentleman farmer and writer
- William Strickland (architect) (1788–1854), American architect from Pennsylvania
- William Strickland (Conservative politician) (1880–1954), Member of Parliament for Coventry
- William Strickland (conductor) (1914–1991), American conductor and organist

== See also ==
- Strickland (disambiguation)
- Strickland Propane, a fictional propane and propane accessories supplier in the animated series King of the Hill
- Strickland-Constable baronets
