= William Strickland =

William or Bill Strickland may refer to:

== Arts and entertainment ==
- William Strickland (conductor) (1914–1991), American conductor and organist
- William Bradley Strickland (1929–1990), composer, music educator, and music publisher

== Law and politics ==
- Sir William Strickland, 1st Baronet (c. 1596–1673), Member of Parliament during the English Civil War
- Sir William Strickland, 3rd Baronet (1665–1724), Member of Parliament for Yorkshire
- Sir William Strickland, 4th Baronet (c. 1686–1735), British statesman
- William Strickland (Conservative politician) (1880–1954), English politician, MP for Coventry

== Sports ==
- Bill Strickland (footballer, born 1864) (1864–1959), Australian rules football player and coach for Collingwood
- Bill Strickland (footballer, born 1882) (1882–1958), Australian rules football player for Carlton
- Bill Strickland (American football) (1898–1976), American football player
- Bill Strickland (baseball) (1908–2000), American Major League pitcher
- Bill Strickland (writer) (born 1964), American author and journalist primarily focused on cycling

== Others ==
- William Strickland (bishop) (died 1419), English clergyman
- William Strickland (navigator) (died 1598), credited with introducing the turkey to England, later a Member of Parliament
- William Strickland (farmer) (1753–1834), English gentleman farmer and writer
- William Strickland (architect) (1788–1854), American architect from Pennsylvania
- Bill Strickland (born 1947), American community leader, author, and CEO
