= Strickland =

Strickland may refer to:

== Places ==
=== Australia ===
- Strickland, Tasmania, a locality

=== Canada ===
- Fauquier-Strickland, Ontario
- Mount Strickland, Yukon

=== Papua New Guinea ===
- Strickland River, Western Province

=== Cumbria, England, United Kingdom ===
- Strickland Ketel
- Strickland Roger
- Great Strickland
- Little Strickland

=== United States ===
- Strickland, Wisconsin, a town
  - Strickland (community), Wisconsin, an unincorporated community within Strickland, Wisconsin

== Court cases ==
- Strickland v Rocla Concrete Pipes Ltd, a 1971 High Court of Australia case
- Strickland v. Sony, a 2005 case in Alabama
- Strickland v. Washington, a 1984 US Supreme Court case

== Other uses ==
- Strickland (surname)
- Strickland Propane, a fictional business in the television series King of the Hill
- Strickland's Frozen Custard, a frozen treats franchise based in Akron, Ohio
- USS Strickland (DE-333), a US Navy destroyer escort, in service 1944–1960

== See also ==
- Strickland House (disambiguation)
