= Listed buildings in Little Strickland =

Little Strickland is a civil parish in Westmorland and Furness, Cumbria, England. It contains eleven listed buildings that are recorded in the National Heritage List for England. Of these, one is listed at Grade II*, the middle of the three grades, and the others are at Grade II, the lowest grade. The parish contains the village of Little Strickland and the surrounding countryside. The listed buildings comprise houses, farmhouses, farm buildings, and a church and associated structures. In April 2019 Thrimby parish was merged with Little Strickland, for its buildings, see Listed buildings in Thrimby.

== Key ==
Grade	Criteria
II*	Particularly important buildings of more than special interest
II	Buildings of national importance and special interest

== Buildings ==
Name and location	Photograph	Date	Notes	Grade
Strickland Hall and stables 54.57067°N 2.67652°W	—	c. 1540	Also known as Low Hall, it was extended later in the 16th, and in the 17th, centuries. The hall is built in limestone with quoins and it has a green slate roof with sandstone coping. There are two storeys, the house has four bays, and the stable range, which has been partly converted for domestic use, has five bays and is at right angles, giving a T-shaped plan. The windows are mullioned and most also have transoms. In the stable range there are also doorway and loft doors.	II*
High Hall; 54.56859°N 2.67590°W	—	1600	A roughcast farmhouse with a green slate roof, two storeys and three bays. The doorway has a Tudor arched surround, and the windows are mullioned. Inside the house are two 17th-century fireplaces with coats of arms, and a spiral stone staircase.	II
Sandriggs; 54.58367°N 2.67796°W	—	Late 17th century	The farmhouse, which was extended in the early 18th century, is in roughcast stone with a green slate roof. There are two storeys and two bays, and a single-bay extension to the left. The windows in the original part are mullioned and there is a fire window; in the extension the windows are sashes. Inside the house is an inglenook and a bressumer.	II
Moorriggs and barn 54.58274°N 2.68040°W	—	1688	The farmhouse and barn are roughcast with green slate roofs. The house has two storeys and three bays, with a rear right-angled single-bay extension and a barn, giving an L-shaped plan. In the original part of the house are casement windows, and in the extension the windows are sashes. The barn dates from the late 18th century, it has three bays, a plank door with an inscribed lintel, and a large segmental-arched cart entrance.	II
Greyhound House, stable and barn 54.56997°N 2.67614°W	—	1707	Originally a farmhouse, then a public house, and later a private house, it is roughcast with green slate roofs. The house has a chamfered plinth, quoins, an eaves cornice, and coped gables. There are two storeys, three bays, a two-bay rear extension, a single-bay stable to the right, and a barn at the left with a byre at right angles. In the house are sash windows, and the stable has a doorway with a Tudor arched inscribed lintel. The barn has a flat-headed cart entrance and plank doors.	II
The Barracks; 54.57005°N 2.67850°W	—	Early 18th century	A house and former stables, rendered on a projecting boulder plinth, with a green slate roof. There are two storeys, the house has three bays, and the stable, now incorporated into the house, has two bays to the left. On the front is a stone porch and a doorway with an inscribed lintel. The windows are casements, and in the former stable is a Tudor arched doorway. Inside the house is a bressumer.	II
Barn, Strickland Hall; 54.57051°N 2.67701°W		Mid 18th century	The barn is in mixed sandstone and limestone and has a green slate roof. It is a long barn in a single storey. In the farmyard front is a cart entrance, and in both fronts are ventilation slits.	II
Barn, High Hall; 54.56858°N 2.67531°W	—	Late 18th century	A limestone barn with a green slate roof, it has two storeys and five bays, and a two-bay extension to the left. On the front are plank doors, a loft door, and ventilation slits.	II
Townend Farmhouse; 54.57142°N 2.67770°W	—	Late 18th or early 19th century	A sandstone farmhouse, rendered at the front, with quoins and a green slate roof. There are two storeys, three bays, a central doorway and sash windows, all in stone surrounds.	II
St Mary's Church; 54.57091°N 2.67819°W		1814	The church is roughcast on a chamfered plinth, with sandstone quoins and a green slate roof. It consists of a west porch and a nave but no chancel. On the west gable of the nave is a bellcote. The windows have pointed heads and contain Y-tracery. Inside the church is a west gallery carried on slender Doric columns.	II
Gate piers and overthrow, St Mary's Church; 54.57084°N 2.67835°W	—	Early 19th century	The gate piers and overthrow are at the entrance to the churchyard. The piers are in sandstone, they are square and rusticated on a chamfered plinth, and have shaped caps. The overthrow is in wrought iron, it has a serpentine shape, and supports a Victorian gas lamp, later converted into electricity.	II
