= West Michigan Center for Art and Technology =

Education and training facility in Grand Rapids, Michigan

The West Michigan Center for Arts and Technology (WMCAT) is a not-for-profit education and training facility in downtown Grand Rapids, Michigan. WMCAT opened in 2005 with 8,477 sq. ft. (since expanded to 12,414 sq. ft.) of renovated former Jacobson's department store space earning a Leadership in Energy and Environmental Design certification and winning an American Institute of Architects Award in 2006. It is modeled after Bill Strickland's Manchester Craftsmen’s Guild and Bidwell Training Center in Pittsburgh, PA. It is also inspired by the Cincinnati Arts and Technology Center (CATC) Its first graduating class in 2009 had an 85 percent high-school graduation rate among its students, 9 percent higher than the composite average of the four participating local schools.

WMCAT annually recognizes local organizational examples of innovation, imagination and inspiration with its Wow! awards.

On the outside east wall of the WMCAT building is a large mosaic mural created by professional artist Tracy Van Duinen with help from a team of WMCAT teen apprentices. The piece won 2nd place in the 2011 ArtPrize public art competition for which Van Duinen was awarded $100,000 in prize money.
