= Margaret Strickland =

Margaret Strickland may refer to:

- Margaret Strickland (judge) (born 1980), Judge of the United States District Court for the District of New Mexico
- Margaret Strickland (writer) (c. 1880–1970), English writer
- Margaret, Lady Strickland, DBE, (1867–1950), English aristocrat
