= Samsung R810 Finesse =

Mobile phone model

Samsung Finesse
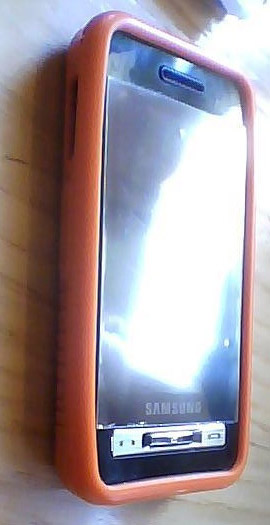
- Manufacturer: Samsung Electronics
- Type: Touchscreen smartphone
- Series: Samsung SCH Series
- Successor: Samsung Caliber
- Compatible networks: CDMA
- Dimensions: 4.56 in (116 mm) H 2.29 in (58 mm) W.488 in (12.4 mm) D
- Weight: 3.63 oz (103 g)
- Operating system: TouchWiz 1.0 Based-On Android 1.5 (Cupcake)
- Memory: 150 MB on board memory
- Storage: 8 or 16 GB (flash nand memory)
- Removable storage: micro-SD (up to 16 GB supported)
- Battery: Li-pol 1000 mAh; Talk time: 430 min Standby time: 300 hr
- Rear camera: 2 megapixel with digital zoom
- Display: 240×400 px, 3.2 in with TFT
- Connectivity: Bluetooth, Mobile browser, GPS
- Data inputs: Resistive touchscreen display

The Samsung SCH-R810 Finesse is a mobile phone by Samsung released in 2009. The successor to the Finesse is the Samsung Caliber (RCH-860).

The RCH-R810 is carried by MetroPCS and Pocket Communications.
