= Peter Strickland =

Peter Strickland may refer to:

- Pete Strickland (born 1957), American basketball coach
- Peter Strickland (director) (born 1973), British filmmaker
- Peter Strickland (British Army officer) (1869–1951), World War One infantry general
- Peter Strickland (music executive), American music executive
- Pete Strickland, a character portrayed by Shea Whigham in the HBO television series Perry Mason
