= Walter Strickland (disambiguation) =

Walter Strickland (1598?–1671) was an English politician.

Walter Strickland may also refer to:

- Walter Strickland, 9th Baronet (1851–1938), English translator and radical
- Walter Strickland (14th century MP) for Westmorland
- Walter Strickland (died 1569), MP for Westmorland
- Walter Strickland (c.1623-71), MP for Thirsk 1661–71
- Walter Strickland (architect) (1841–1915), Canadian architect
- Walter G. Strickland (1850–1928), English art historian, bibliographer, and antiquary
