= Aio Wireless =

Former subsidiary unit of AT&T Inc. that provided prepaid wireless service

Aio Wireless LLC
- Type: Subsidiary
- Industry: Telecommunication industry
- Founded: May 7, 2013; 13 years ago
- Defunct: 2014; 12 years ago
- Fate: Merged with Cricket Communications
- Successor: Cricket Wireless
- Headquarters: Alpharetta, Georgia, United States
- Area served: United States
- Key people: Jennifer Van Buskirk (President), Cheryl Choy (Head of Network)
- Products: Mobile phones; Tablets; Mobile broadband devices
- Services: Wireless communications
- Parent: AT&T Inc.
- Website: web.archive.org/web/20131118203916/http://www.aiowireless.com/home.html

Aio Wireless (pronounced /eɪ.oʊ/ "A-O" Wireless) was an American prepaid wireless service provider in the United States that was wholly owned by AT&T Inc.

It was launched in May 2013 to compete against rival prepaid networks. In 2014, the service was merged with Cricket Wireless, another AT&T owned company, ending the use of the Aio Wireless name.

== History ==
=== Identity ===
The name Aio was as an abbreviation of the term "All in One", referring to the provider's fixed price inclusion of unlimited calling, unlimited texting, and specific tiers of data of speeds of up to 4 Mbit/s with unlimited throttled slow data afterward.

Aio was nominally run in the model of a "small startup business" but with the expectation to become a nationwide player in the sub-sector, as large as MetroPCS. It was designed to staunch the reduction in number of AT&T prepaid customers, as the AT&T GoPhone division lost customers to T-Mobile and Sprint, in part because of AT&T's failure to promote the brand.

Aio initially launched in the southern US cities of Houston, Orlando, and Tampa, and with small variance in the data tiers offered in each city. It eventually grew to 27 markets, with plans to expand its physical presence into areas with a population totaling 220 million Americans by the summer of 2016.

Aio developed a fully separate brand identity, with its "own processes, retail environments, culture and brand" upon launch, "operating at arm's length from the rest of" AT&T.

=== Market placement ===
The brand was designed to compete with the other brands and providers, likewise sold through independent dealer stores in major urban areas, that offered "value-conscious consumers" unlimited calling, texting, and throttled data, such as Sprint's Boost Mobile and Virgin Mobile, T-Mobile's newly acquired MetroPCS and its newly developed secondary prepaid brand GoSmart Mobile, and America Movil's Tracfone Wireless lineup of brands.

AT&T decided to create Aio as a separate brand for those different, "value-conscious" customers targeted by Aio's offerings. Aio, and its successor Cricket, allowed AT&T to make use of the AT&T cellular network to aim for price-conscious consumers and experiment with offerings that might be later made available to AT&T postpaid customers, by competing through lower priced plans against other large providers, while still offering the comfort, desired by some consumers, of backing by AT&T, and while keeping the main AT&T brand separate and positioned as a premium service with premium prices.

Aio was perceived by some commentators as actually designed to respond directly to T-Mobile and its new policy of no longer requiring, or offering, service contracts on its postpaid plans, although Aio Wireless president Jennifer Van Buskirk denied this.

In August 2013, T-Mobile sued AT&T over Aio's use of a color in its branding and on its website allegedly so similar to T-Mobile's trademarked magenta that it would confuse consumers into believing that Aio was a T-mobile offering. Internal AT&T documents turned over during the color trademark litigation revealed that AT&T had intended Aio to also compete directly with T-Mobile itself and capture some T-Mobile customers. In February 2014, a federal judge granted T-Mobile's request for a preliminary injunction prohibiting Aio from using a specific plum color or confusingly similar colors in its advertising, marketing, and store design.

=== Offerings ===
Aio Wireless initially offered its services using AT&T Mobility's nationwide GSM and HSPA+ wireless networks, but not LTE. It added LTE data access with speeds of up to 8 Mbit/s in June 2013. Tethering was also forbidden under Aio's terms of services. Although using AT&T towers, Aio Wireless routed its customers' voice and data traffic through its own systems.

The entry-level $40 monthly plan initially included 100 MB of data (soon increased to 250 MB of data), while the $55 plan included 2 GB, and the $70 plan included 7 GB. A 1 GB top-up of data, and an international calling add-on, were available for $10 a month.

The phones available for purchase from Aio were seen as typical for a prepaid provider, ranging from $30 feature phones to $50 low-end smartphones to various iPhone models, both at reduced prices for refurbished handsets to $649.99 for the then-new iPhone 5, the standard unsubsidized price.

The company also offered a tablet and corresponding $15 mobile data plan allowing 250 MB.

=== End through merger ===
In May 2014, Aio Wireless merged with Cricket Wireless, due to the acquisition of Leap Wireless, parent of Cricket Wireless, by AT&T. AT&T, Aio, and Cricket later announced that the New Cricket would operate on the AT&T network, just as Aio had, and that users of Cricket's existing CDMA network would be migrated to AT&T's network in advance of the required switchover of all users.

Many aspects of Aio developed during its existence were carried over to the new Cricket, including the processes, retail setups, culture, branding, and operation policies (including user data speed throttling).

== See also ==
- AT&T Mobility
- AT&T GoPhone
- Cricket Wireless
