= The Armstrong Lie =

2013 film

- Film poster
- Directed by: Alex Gibney
- Written by: Alex Gibney
- Produced by: Frank Marshall; Matt Tolmach; Alex Gibney
- Starring: Lance Armstrong
- Narrated by: Alex Gibney
- Cinematography: Maryse Alberti
- Edited by: Andy Grieve; Tim Squyres; Lindy Jankura
- Music by: David Kahne
- Production companies: The Kennedy/Marshall Company; Jigsaw Productions; Matt Tolmach Productions
- Distributed by: Sony Pictures Classics
- Release dates: August 2, 2013 (Venice); October 12, 2013 (US)
- Running time: 124 minutes
- Country: United States
- Language: English
- Box office: $428,795

The Armstrong Lie is a 2013 American documentary film directed by Alex Gibney about the cyclist Lance Armstrong. Originally begun as a project titled The Road Back about Armstrong's return to competitive cycling in 2009, the film's subject shifted in light of renewed allegations of doping against Armstrong. The film's final title is the English translation of "Le Mensonge Armstrong", the title of the front-page article of the August 23, 2005, issue of the French sports newspaper L'Équipe.

The film was screened out of competition at the 70th Venice International Film Festival, and in the Special Presentation section at the 2013 Toronto International Film Festival.

== Background ==
In 2009, filmmaker Alex Gibney set out to make The Road Back, a documentary about cyclist Lance Armstrong's comeback after a four-year retirement from the sport, but a new series of doping allegations and investigations against Armstrong led to the project being shelved. In 2012, Armstrong was banned from competition for life and stripped of his seven Tour de France titles. On January 14, 2013, three hours after appearing on Oprah and publicly admitting to doping, Armstrong conducted a brief interview with Gibney, and he later sat down for a longer interview to set the record straight about his career.

== Cast ==
- Lance Armstrong
- Reed Albergotti
- Frankie Andreu
- Betsy Andreu
- Johan Bruyneel
- Alberto Contador
- Daniel Coyle
- Michele Ferrari
- George Hincapie
- Steve Madden
- Filippo Simeoni
- Bill Stapleton
- Bill Strickland
- Jonathan Vaughters
- David Walsh

The film includes footage from Larry King Live, The Daily Show, and the South Park episode "A Scause for Applause".

== Reception ==
Reviews of the film were positive. On the review aggregator website Rotten Tomatoes, 82% of 121 critics' reviews of the film are positive, with an average rating of 6.9/10; the site's "critics consensus" reads: "Smartly constructed and scathingly sharp, The Armstrong Lie presents an effective indictment of its unscrupulous subject -- as well as the sports culture that spawned him." On Metacritic, the film has a weighted average score of 67 out of 100 based on reviews from 37 critics, indicating "generally favorable" reviews.

In his review for The Observer, Mark Kermode gave the film 4 stars out of 5, writing: "Armstrong comes across as both admirably resilient and frighteningly selfish, his treatment of those who crossed him … tellingly callous, his refusal to be beaten bizarrely engaging." Peter Howell of the Toronto Star gave the film 3 stars out of 4 and said: "Gibney gives the truth as full an airing as seems humanly possible, given that the subject is a world-class liar." Peter Travers of Rolling Stone also gave the film 3 out of 4 stars, writing: "The movie rambles at two-plus hours, but the provocation never stops." Kate Muir of The Times wrote: "The tale is fascinating, not just for cycling enthusiasts, but connoisseurs of the human condition." Boyd van Hoeij of The Hollywood Reporter called the film "A quite absorbing but never riveting or revelatory overview of Armstrong's career and testy personality."

Philippa Hawker of The Sydney Morning Herald gave the film 3 stars out of 5, writing: "This is not a story about doping, it is a story about power, someone observes; Armstrong exercised and abused it, with the complicity of many in the cycling world." Peter Bradshaw of The Guardian also gave the film 3 out of 5 stars, describing it as "a striking but flawed documentary", and writing: "the slippery doper hedges his general admission with all sorts of hints that this matter wasn't quite what his accusers have said, and Gibney circles around his man, never quite going in for the kill." Deborah Ross of The Spectator wrote that the film was "fascinating as far as it goes but it may not go as far as you would like, and may not ask the questions you would like", concluding: "As I said, it's entirely possible you can't get to the heart of Armstrong because there is no heart, but I'd like to have seen someone have a go."

== See also ==
- List of films about bicycles and cycling
