= Michael Strickland =

Michael Strickland may refer to:

- Michael Strickland (British Army officer) (1913–1982), British military adviser to the King of Jordan
- Mike Strickland (born 1951), Canadian football player
- Michael Strickland (physicist) (born 1969), American theoretical physicist
- Michael Strickland (blogger) (born 1980), American conservative blogger
