= Helsington =

Civil parish in Cumbria, England

Coordinates: 54.299°N 2.801°W

- Sizergh Castle

- Location within Cumbria
- Population: 308 (2011)
- OS grid reference: SD4889
- Civil parish: Helsington
- Unitary authority: Westmorland and Furness
- Ceremonial county: Cumbria
- Region: North West
- Country: England
- Sovereign state: United Kingdom
- Post town: KENDAL
- Postcode district: LA8–LA9
- Dialling code: 01539
- Police: Cumbria
- Fire: Cumbria
- Ambulance: North West
- UK Parliament: Westmorland and Lonsdale

Helsington is a civil parish in the Westmorland and Furness district of the English county of Cumbria. It includes the village of Brigsteer and Sizergh Castle and Garden, a property owned by the National Trust. In the 2001 census the parish had a population of 288, increasing at the 2011 census to 308.

Significant Roman artefacts have been discovered in the north of the parish close to the ruined fort at Watercrook, Alavana.

== See also ==
- Listed buildings in Helsington
