= Listed buildings in Great Strickland =

Great Strickland is a civil parish in Westmorland and Furness, Cumbria, England. It contains 17 listed buildings that are recorded in the National Heritage List for England. All the listed buildings are designated at Grade II, the lowest of the three grades, which is applied to "buildings of national importance and special interest". The parish contains the village of Great Strickland and the surrounding countryside. Almost all the listed building are houses, farmhouses or farm buildings, the others being a church and a limekiln.

== Buildings ==
Name and location	Photograph	Date	Notes
Taylor's Farmhouse and barn 54.59853°N 2.68721°W	—	17th century (probable)	The farmhouse was extended and the barn added in 1746. They are in limestone, partly rendered, and have a green slate roof. There are two storeys, the house has four bays, and the barn has three. In the original part of the house is a fire window and a horizontally-sliding sash window, and the later part has a doorway and sash windows, all with stone surrounds. In the barn are a segmental-arched entrance, casement windows with chamfered surrounds, a winnowing door, and ventilation slits. Inside the house is an inglenook and a bressumer. (Note: Street View in March 2010 shows that the barn has been converted for residential use.)
Holly House; 54.59931°N 2.68552°W	—	1719	A rendered house with a green slate roof, in two storeys and with two bays. Above the central doorway is an inscribed and dated lintel, and the windows are casements; the door and windows have stone surrounds.
Woodside; 54.60809°N 2.66656°W	—	1742	A stone farmhouse with a green slate roof, two storeys and five bays. The doorway has a chamfered surround and an initialled and dated lintel, and the windows are mullioned. At the rear of the house are outshuts.
Ivy House; 54.60038°N 2.68130°W	—	1719	A rendered house on a chamfered plinth with a green slate roof. There are two storeys and three bays. The central doorway has a stone surround and an inscribed and dated lintel. The windows are mullioned, and there is a narrow fire window.
Bradley and barn 54.60172°N 2.66160°W	—	Mid-18th century	The farmhouse and barn are in limestone with a green slate roof. The house has quoins, and the roof is hipped at the right end. There are two storeys and two bays, with the two-bay barn at right angles at the rear. On the front of the house is a gabled porch, and mullioned windows with sandstone surrounds, and in the right return are sash windows. The barn contains flat-headed doorways and loft doors, all with stone surrounds.
Mealy Syke and barn 54.59425°N 2.64635°W	—	Mid-18th century	The farmhouse is in limestone with sandstone quoins and a green slate roof. There are two storeys and three bays. The central doorway has a stone surround, and the windows are mullioned. The barn has three bays, and contains a segmental-arched cart entrance, and two doorways, one with a flat head and the other with a segmental head.
Midtown Cottage; 54.59954°N 2.68431°W	—	Mid-18th century	A stone house with a green slate roof, in two storeys and two bays. There is a central doorway and horizontally-sliding sash windows, all with stone surrounds.
Midtown Farmhouse and barn 54.59959°N 2.68351°W	—	18th century	The barn is the older part, the farmhouse dates from the 19th century, and the barn has been partly converted for domestic use. The barn is in a mixture of calciferous sandstone and limestone, the farmhouse is rendered, and both have green slate roofs. The house has two storeys and three bays, a central door with a fanlight, and sash windows; the door and windows have stone surrounds. The barn has five bays, the domestic part has casement windows, and in the other part are doorways with flat and segmental heads, loft doorways, and ventilation slits.
Old Midtown Farmhouse and barn 54.60006°N 2.68335°W	—	Mid-18th century	The farmhouse and the barn, which has been converted for domestic use, are rendered with green slate roofs. The house has two storeys and three bays, a central gabled porch, and mullioned windows in stone surrounds. The lower barn is to the right and it contains a sash window.
Barn east of Holly House; 54.59946°N 2.68527°W	—	1767	The barn is in limestone with quoins and a green slate roof. There are four bays. The barn contains a segmental-arched cart entrance with a dated keystone, a blocked door, a doorway with an alternate block surround, a loft opening, a casement window, and external wooden steps leading to a loft door.
Wood House; 54.61677°N 2.67205°W	—	Late 18th or early 19th century	A roughcast farmhouse with a green slate roof. There are two storeys and three bays flanked by lower two-storey single-bay wings. In the central part the windows are sashes, and in the wings they are casements. The doors and windows have stone surrounds.
Corner Cottage; 54.59798°N 2.68822°W	—	Early 19th century	A limestone house with sandstone quoins and a green slate roof, it has two storeys and two bays. The doorway and sash windows have stone surrounds.
Fern Cottage, barn and stable 54.59808°N 2.68802°W	—	Early 19th century	The house and outbuildings are in limestone with a green slate roof. The house has quoins, two storeys and two bays. The central doorway and the sash windows have stone surrounds. To the right is a one-bay barn and a one-bay stable that contain a segmental-headed cart entrance, a doorway and a loft door. (Note: Street View in March 2010 shows that the barn and stable have been converted for residential use.)
Sunnyside; 54.59959°N 2.68302°W	—	Early 19th century	A sandstone house on a chamfered plinth with a green slate roof. There are two storeys and three bays. In the centre is a Tuscan prostyle porch, and a door with a patterned fanlight. The windows are sashes in stone surrounds.
Waterfall Bridge Limekiln; 54.60883°N 2.69701°W	—	Early 19th century	The limekiln is in stone and has a tapering rectangular body with quoins and a segmental-headed arch with voussoirs. A vaulted passage leads to two square openings. At the top of the kiln is its mouth and a masonry platform.
Town Head Farmhouse; 54.59756°N 2.68876°W	—	1826	The farmhouse is in limestone with sandstone quoins and a green slate roof. There are two storeys and two bays. The central doorway has a lintel with an initialled and dated oval plaque, and a cornice, and the windows are sashes. The door and windows have stone surrounds.
St Barnabas' Church; 54.60026°N 2.67933°W		1871–72	The church, designed by George Watson, is in local ironstone with dressings in Stanton sandstone, and a slate roof. It consists of a nave and chancel under one roof, the chancel with a polygonal apse, a north porch, and a southeast vestry. On the junction of the nave and the chancel is a bellcote with a spirelet, and the windows are lancets.

== Notes and references ==
=== Sources ===
- Historic England, "Taylor's Farmhouse and barn adjoining, Great Strickland (1101543)", National Heritage List for England
- Historic England, "Holly House, Great Strickland (1326766)", National Heritage List for England
- Historic England, "Woodside, Great Strickland (1101727)", National Heritage List for England
- Historic England, "Ivy House, Great Strickland (1326767)", National Heritage List for England
- Historic England, "Bradley and barn adjoining, Great Strickland (1101752)", National Heritage List for England
- Historic England, "Mealy Syke and barn adjoining, Great Strickland (1326769)", National Heritage List for England
- Historic England, "Midtown Cottage, Great Strickland (1145337)", National Heritage List for England
- Historic England, "Midtown Farmhouse and adjoining barn, Great Strickland (1101487)", National Heritage List for England
- Historic England, "Old Midtown Farmhouse and barn adjoining, Great Strickland (1347889)", National Heritage List for England
- Historic England, "Barn east of Holly House, Great Strickland (1145335)", National Heritage List for England
- Historic England, "Wood House, Great Strickland (1101739)", National Heritage List for England
- Historic England, "Corner Cottage, Great Strickland (1347918)", National Heritage List for England
- Historic England, "Fern Cottage and adjoining barn/stable, Great Strickland (1145336)", National Heritage List for England
- Historic England, "Sunnyside, Great Strickland (1326768)", National Heritage List for England
- Historic England, "Waterfall Bridge Limekiln, Great Strickland (1390838)", National Heritage List for England
- Historic England, "Town Head Farmhouse, Great Strickland (1101532)", National Heritage List for England
- Historic England, "Church of St Barnabas, Great Strickland (1268380)", National Heritage List for England
- Historic England, Listed Buildings
- Hyde, Matthew; Pevsner, Nikolaus (2010) [1967], Cumbria, The Buildings of England, New Haven and London: Yale University Press, ISBN 978-0-300-12663-1
