= Rob Strickland =

Robert A. Strickland
- Born: Robert Andrew Strickland
- Education: Brandeis University (BA)
- Occupation: Technology executive
- Known for: CIO/CTO roles at T-Mobile USA, Cricket Wireless, EchoStar and The Weather Channel
- Website: m37ventures.com

Robert A. "Rob" Strickland is an American technology executive who has served as chief information officer or chief technology officer at several major U.S. media and telecommunications companies, including The Weather Channel, EchoStar, T-Mobile USA and Leap Wireless / Cricket Communications. He is the founder and chief executive of M37 Ventures, a technology and management consulting firm.

== Early life and education ==
Strickland holds a Bachelor of Arts degree in mathematics from Brandeis University.

== Career ==
=== The Weather Channel ===
Strickland was hired as chief information officer of The Weather Channel in January 1998. In their history of the network, founder Frank Batten and Jeffrey L. Cruikshank wrote that the company "hired … a chief information officer, Rob Strickland, who initiated a serious and successful push into the digital age," characterizing the appointment as a turning point in the channel's expansion onto the Internet.

=== EchoStar ===
Strickland served as senior vice president and chief information officer of EchoStar in the mid-2000s, where he oversaw the deployment of a voice-recognition system for the company's call centers and renegotiated EchoStar's billing-services contract with CSG Systems.

=== T-Mobile USA ===
Strickland was senior vice president and chief information officer of T-Mobile USA from 2006 to 2010. There he led an enterprise service-oriented architecture initiative, internally branded "OpenSpan," that consolidated the carrier's customer-service applications into a single representative-facing interface. The project was recognized with a CIO 100 Award in 2009.

=== Leap Wireless / Cricket Communications ===
Strickland was executive vice president and chief technology officer of Leap Wireless / Cricket Communications, with responsibility for IT, network engineering, operations and product development, until the company's $1.2 billion acquisition by AT&T in 2014.

=== Consulting and M37 Ventures ===
Strickland founded Strickland Consulting LLC and was a co-founder of The Digital Nexus, a management-consulting firm formed in 2014 from the combination of Strickland Consulting and the integrated-marketing agency AIM. He is the founder and chief executive of M37 Ventures, a technology and management-consulting firm working primarily in digital and health technologies, and has held interim executive engagements including chief technology officer at Neustar and at Televisa / Sky México, and chief operating officer at TruConnect.

== Board and advisory roles ==
Strickland has served on the boards or advisory boards of Globys, B2B Soft, Afiniti, RStor, Motive Companies, GenXComm, Centri Technologies, Text+ and the conservation nonprofit OCEARCH. He joined the Information Technology Advisory Council of the Boston Red Sox in 2019 and the IT Task Force of the Rady Children's Hospital Board of Trustees in 2017.

== Recognition ==
- CIO 100 Award, 2006 and 2009
- Computerworld Premier 100 IT Leaders, 2008
- InformationWeek 500, ranked No. 16, 2007
