= William Strickland (farmer) =

British writer and farmer

Sir William Strickland
- Born: 18 February 1753; Yorkshire, England
- Died: 8 January 1834 (aged 80); Boynton, Yorkshire, England
- Occupations: Farmer, writer

Sir William Strickland, 6th Baronet (18 February 1753 – 8 January 1834) was an 18th-century gentleman farmer and writer from Yorkshire, England. He was the eldest son of Sir George Strickland of York, England, from the ancient English Strickland family of Sizergh. He established his own farm at Welburn in York and, in 1808, succeeded his father as the sixth Baronet of Boynton.

== Agriculture ==
At the end of the 18th century, he travelled to the United States, where he made a survey of agricultural land, prices and wages, which he published as a Journal of a Tour of the United States of America, 1794–95. The account was also published in the Farmer's Register and in the 1800 Communications to the Board of Agriculture. His trip covered the period from 20 September 1794 until 29 July 1795. His travels included meeting with Thomas Jefferson in May 1795 who took notes of their conversation.

Among his many observations on the state of American agriculture was a less than flattering commentary on the slave economies of Virginia and Maryland:

Nothing can be conceived more inert than a slave; his unwilling labour is discovered in every step he takes; he moves not if he can avoid it; if the eyes of the overseer be off him, he sleeps. The ox and horse, driven by the slave, appear to sleep also; all is listless inactivity; all motion is evidently compulsory.

== Numismatics ==
In addition to his research on agriculture, William Strickland was an avid collector and acquired a number of 1794 and 1795 US coins during his trip. These coins were passed down through his lineage and are now associated with the Lord St. Oswald provenance and among the world's most sought after coins. The provenance is attributed to a 1964 London Christie's auction where the coins appeared listed as "the property of Major the Lord St. Oswald, M.C.", the title of Strickland's descendant, Rowland Denys Guy Winn, 4th Baron St Oswald, a member of the House of Lords. The coins themselves were kept in excellent condition, stored in the family's 18th century coin cabinet made by Thomas Chippendale himself.

In 2015, a 1794 flowing hair dollar from Strickland's original collection was sold as part of the D. Brent Pogue Collection for US$4,993,750 by Stack's Bowers and Sotheby's to Laura Sperber of Legend Numismatics. This result places Strickland's Lord St. Oswald 1794 dollar on the List of most expensive coins.

== Personal life ==
He married Miss Cholmley, of Howsham on 15 April 1778. They had two children: Sir George Strickland (born 26 November 1782) and Anne Strickland (born 31 December 1790).
