= Brigsteer =

Village in Cumbria, England

Coordinates: 54.299°N 2.801°W

- Wheatsheaf Inn

- Location within Cumbria
- OS grid reference: SD4889
- Civil parish: Helsington
- Unitary authority: Westmorland and Furness
- Ceremonial county: Cumbria
- Region: North West
- Country: England
- Sovereign state: United Kingdom
- Post town: KENDAL
- Postcode district: LA8
- Dialling code: 01539
- Police: Cumbria
- Fire: Cumbria
- Ambulance: North West
- UK Parliament: Westmorland and Lonsdale

Brigsteer is a village in Cumbria, England.

On 1 August 2016 it was included in the Lake District National Park.

== Politics ==
In 1974, under the Local Government Act 1972, Brigsteer became part of the South Lakeland district. South Lakeland was abolished in 2023 and it is now part of the Westmorland and Furness unitary authority area.

Brigsteer is part of the Westmorland and Lonsdale parliamentary constituency for which Tim Farron is the current Member of Parliament, representing the Liberal Democrats.

== See also ==
- Listed buildings in Helsington
