= Pocket Communications =

American cell phone provider

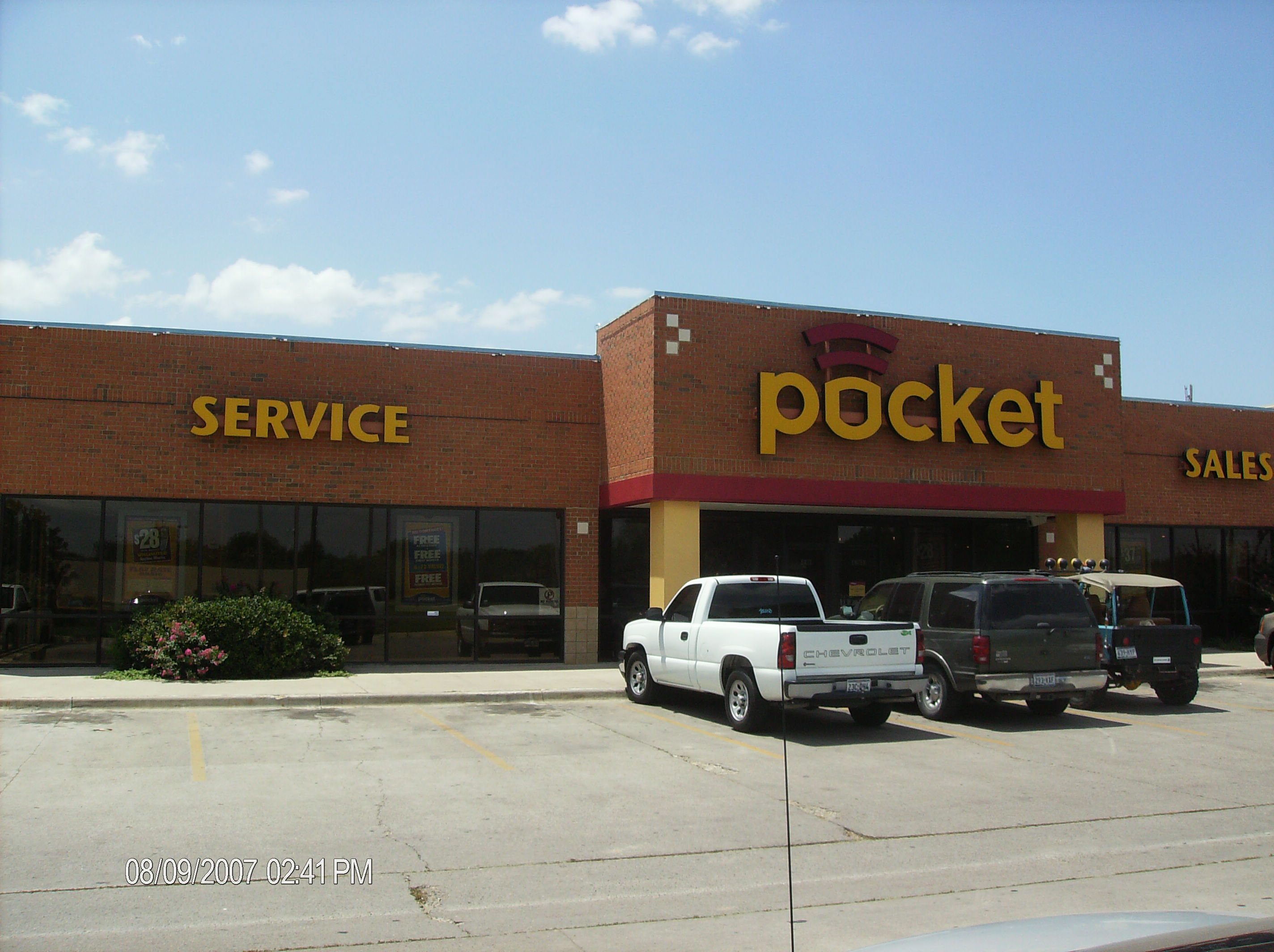
Pocket Communications Laredo branch office.

Pocket Communications was a PCS CDMA 1xRTT provider of unlimited cellular phone service based in San Antonio, Texas, United States. It offered service plans similar to those of Cricket Communications and MetroPCS with unlimited local phone and messaging service on a month to month basis with no contract. Its founder Paul Posner started as a local paging operator in San Antonio before becoming a dealer for Southwestern Bell Mobile Systems, Houston Cellular, and BellSouth Mobility in 7 markets in Texas and the Southeast under the name Discount Cellular & Paging. After selling these operations in 1997, Posner spent 7 years trying to acquire FCC licenses required to build a cellular network and was ultimately successful in FCC Auction 58 in 2004. Pocket launched service in 2006 in San Antonio and competed directly with Cricket Communications in the only US market where two flat-rate providers competed head to head. Pocket's unique marketing strategy included operating hundreds of small retail locations with just one employee, oversaturation of billboard advertising, and the use of chimpanzees in its advertising. In its first year of operations, Pocket became the fastest growth company in the history of the US wireless communications, achieving positive cash flow in just 6 months. Subsequent expansion from San Antonio to Laredo, the Rio Grande Valley, and Corpus Christi markets and a customer base of over 400,000 subscribers ultimately led to a merger offer from Cricket Communications in late 2010. Cricket was subsequently sold to ATT in 2015. ATT continues to operate Cricket as a stand-alone business and a "flanker brand.

Aside from its company owned, small store distribution strategy, Pocket had a number of other innovative marketing strategies. Whereas traditional flat rate operators MetroPCS and Cricket built small coverage areas, recruited third party retailers to operate stores as dealers, and outsourced customer service, Pocket ran company-owned stores, its own call center, and built a wide area footprint that exceeded the coverage of all other cellular operators.

In addition, Pocket created a SaaS "handset unlocking" product called Houdini that enabled locked CDMA devices from Verizon, Sprint, and other CDMA operators to be unlocked and re-programmed to operate on Pocket's network. This accounted for over 30% of total Pocket customers. Despite lobbying by the large cellular operators, unlocking cellphones remained a protected activity under DMCA rules and regulations. As a result of success in its own local markets, Pocket eventually spun out a separate company called Houdinisoft that unlocked over 3 million cellphones for 20+ other CDMA operators.

Pocket took on private equity investment in order to expand its operations to the New York/Boston corridor but the 2008 financial market meltdown combined with the launch of a flat rate flanker brand Boost Mobile by Sprint quickly led to a decision to sell the Northeast operations to MetroPCS completing unbroken coverage between their Boston and New York markets., Metro PCS relaunched service on the former Pocket network in March 2011.

Posner went on to form a technology incubator called Carnegie Technologies based in Austin, Texas. Carnegie developed products in satellite communications, IoT, fintech, and cellular/WiFi convergence.

== Joint Venture ==
October 1 Leap (Cricket) acquires Pocket Communications South Texas market.

== Markets ==
The markets in Texas for Pocket Communications included San Antonio, Corpus Christi, Laredo, and the Rio Grande Valley. Pocket also served Hartford, Connecticut, New Haven, Connecticut, Waterbury, Connecticut, and Springfield, Massachusetts markets.

See also

- Leap Wireless, Parent Company of
  - Cricket Communications
  - Jump Mobile
- MetroPCS
