= Listed buildings in Thrimby =

Thrimby is a former civil parish, now in the parish of Little Strickland, in Westmorland and Furness, Cumbria, England. It contained five listed buildings that are recorded in the National Heritage List for England. Of these, one is listed at Grade II*, the middle of the three grades, and the others are at Grade II, the lowest grade. The parish was entirely rural, and the listed buildings consist of farmhouses with associated structures, a house, and a pair of entrance lodges.

== Key ==
Grade	Criteria
II*	Particularly important buildings of more than special interest
II	Buildings of national importance and special interest

== Buildings ==
Name and location	Photograph	Date	Notes	Grade
Thrimby Grange; 54.57133°N 2.68572°W	—	1578	A farmhouse that was extended in the 19th century, it is built in mixed limestone and sandstone, and has a 20th-century tiled roof. There are two storeys and three bays, and a 19th-century extension to the right. The doorway has a stone surround, and the windows are mullioned and transomed with hood moulds. In the left return wall is a projecting garderobe chute.	II
Thrimby Hall; 54.57723°N 2.68884°W	—	1673	A farmhouse in sandstone on a chamfered plinth, with quoins, an eaves cornice, and a green slate roof with stone copings. There are two storeys, seven bays, and a rear outshut. The doorway has a bolection architrave with fluted pilasters, and the windows are mullioned.	II*
Gate piers and garden wall, Thrimby Hall; 54.57712°N 2.68882°W	—	Late 17th century	The walls enclose the garden on three sides at the front of the house. They are in sandstone with flat coping. The central gateway is approached by steps and is flanked by rusticated gate piers that have moulded caps. There is a smaller gateway without piers at the right junction with the house.	II
Hill Top; 54.57476°N 2.68975°W	—	18th century	A rendered house with a green slate roof, two storeys, two bays, and a rear outshut. The central doorway has a stone surround, and the windows are mullioned.	II
Emperor's Lodges, gate piers, walls and railings 54.58227°N 2.69774°W		1895	A pair of entrance lodges built at the southern entrance to Lowther Castle for the visit of Kaiser Wilhelm. The lodges are similar, and mirror each other. They are in sandstone on a plinth, and have quoins, battlemented parapets, and green slate roofs. The lodges have a square plan, two storeys, and porches in the inner returns containing doorways with four-centred heads. The windows are mullioned, and the windows and doors have hood moulds. At the rear are off-centre battlemented towers and single-storey dog-kennel wings. The gate piers are chamfered, and have cornices, and finials in the form of baronet's coronets. In front of the lodges are dwarf walls with cast iron railings.	II
