= Listed buildings in Helsington =

Helsington is a civil parish in the Westmorland and Furness district of Cumbria, England. It contains 21 listed buildings that are recorded in the National Heritage List for England. Of these, one is listed at Grade I, the highest of the three grades, one is at Grade II*, the middle grade, and the others are at Grade II, the lowest grade. The parish includes the village of Brigsteer, and is otherwise rural. The major listed buildings in the parish are Sizergh Castle and associated structures. The other listed buildings include farmhouses, farm buildings, houses, bridges (two of them over dry parts of the Lancaster Canal), a church, a snuff mill, and buildings associated with a former gunpowder works.

== Key ==
Grade	Criteria
I	Buildings of exceptional interest, sometimes considered to be internationally important
II*	Particularly important buildings of more than special interest
II	Buildings of national importance and special interest

== Buildings ==
Name and location	Photograph	Date	Notes	Grade
Sizergh Castle; 54.28411°N 2.77153°W		14th century	A country house that has been altered through the centuries. It is built in limestone with some rendering, and has slate roofs, an embattled parapet, decorative bargeboards and ball finials. The building has a U-shaped plan, consisting of a main range, a north service wing and a south wing. On the entrance front is a projecting embattled porch with a three-storey three-bay block behind, a tower to the right, and a gabled bay to the left. At the rear south corner is a large tower and a taller stair tower. The window vary and include mullioned and transomed windows and Venetian windows.	I
Berryholme Farmhouse; 54.29216°N 2.78081°W	—	17th century	The farmhouse is roughcast and has a green slate roof with a crowstepped gable on the left. In the front is a two-storey gabled porch, and a doorway with a chamfered oak surround and a fanlight. The windows are fixed with opening lights.	II
Holeslack; 54.28886°N 2.78178°W		17th century	A rendered house with a slate roof. It has two storeys, and an L-shaped plan, with a front of five bays. The porch is gabled with a finial, and the windows are sashes.	II
Park End Farmhouse; 54.29274°N 2.79281°W		17th century	The farmhouse is in stone with a green slate roof, two storeys and four bays. In the upper floor is a mullioned window and a cross-window with one opening light, and al the other windows are 20th-century casements. Inside the farmhouse is a large inglenook fireplace.	II
Hawes Farmhouse; 54.28995°N 2.75847°W	—	Late 17th century	The front was added to the farmhouse in the 19th century. The house is in limestone with a slate roof, hipped at the front. There are two storeys with attics. The doorway has a chamfered surround ad an arched head, and the windows are sashes. At the rear is a full height staircase projection.	II
Low House Farmhouse; 54.29835°N 2.77467°W	—	Late 17th century	The farmhouse, later divided into two dwellings, is in roughcast stone with a green slate roof, two storeys and attics. It has an L-shaped plan, the older part being the west wing, the east wing dated 1767. The west wing contains a variety of windows including one that is mullioned. In the east wing is a door with a semicircular traceried fanlight, and sash windows, and at the rear is a round-headed stair window.	II
St John's Church; 54.29343°N 2.78696°W		1726	The church was restored in 1857, 1898 and in 1910. It is built in rendered limestone with sandstone dressings and a roof of Westmorland slate. The church has a rectangular plan, consisting of a nave and chancel in a single cell. On the south side is a porch, on the north side is a vestry and there is a bellcote on the west gable. The windows on the sides have two lights, chamfered surrounds, and chamfered mullions.	II
Hawes Bridge; 54.29500°N 2.75195°W		18th century (probable)	The bridge carries a road over a gorge containing the River Kent. It is in limestone with a curved plan, and consists of two arches with a narrow carriageway. On the upstream side is a large triangular cutwater.	II
Barn, Low House Farm; 54.29855°N 2.77406°W	—	18th century (probable)	A bank barn in limestone with a green slate roof, it has a cart entrance leading from the road.	II
Garden walls, gate piers and summer house, Sizergh Castle; 54.28384°N 2.77202°W		18th century (probable)	The garden wall is in limestone on the side of the stable block and in brick on the side of the garden, The summer house and gate piers are in stone, and the piers are surmounted by stone urns.	II
Stables and barn, Sizergh Castle; 54.28388°N 2.77232°W		18th century	The stable block and barn are in limestone with green slate roofs. The stable block has two storeys and a symmetrical front. In the centre is a block containing a recessed arch, casement windows and a circular recess in the upper floor, and at the top is a hipped roof surmounted by a wooden bell tower with a lead cupola and a weathervane. This flanked by two-bay wing containing casement windows. The bank barn is at right angles to the right, it has two storeys and ten bays, and contains two cart entrances on each side.	II*
Horse Park Bridge; 54.28129°N 2.74681°W		1819	The bridge crosses a dry section of the Lancaster Canal. It is in limestone, and consists of a single three-centred arch. The bridge has bands and slightly arched parapets with overhanging copings. There are slots in the stonework and the remains of iron sluice gates.	II
Larkrigg Hall Bridge; 54.28750°N 2.74749°W		1819	The bridge crosses a dry section of the Lancaster Canal. It is in limestone, and consists of a single three-centred arch. The bridge has bands and slightly arched parapets with overhanging copings.	II
House and outbuildings, Sizergh Castle; 54.28413°N 2.77255°W		Early 19th century (probable)	The house and outbuildings form the northern side of the stable courtyard. They are in stone and have slate roofs.	II
Helsington Laithes Mill; 54.30670°N 2.74880°W	—	19th century (probable)	A snuff mill in limestone with quoins, through-stones, and a green slate roof with a stone ridge. There are two storeys, and in the ground floor is a doorway and a casement window. External steps lead to a doorway and there are also three windows in the upper floor.	II
Barn, Park End Farm; 54.29265°N 2.79255°W	—	19th century (probable)	The barn is in limestone with through-stones and a slate roof, and contains stables, a cow house, and a hay loft above. There are four openings with voussoirs and one with a massive stone lintel.	II
Stables, wall and gate piers, Park End Farm; 54.29264°N 2.79276°W	—	19th century (probable)	The former stables, attached wall, and gate piers are in limestone. The stables are in a single storey, and have a slate roof.	II
Gatehouse and Office, Sedgwick Powder Works; 54.28129°N 2.75640°W	—	Mid-19th century	The building is in limestone, partly rendered, with quoins and a Westmorland slate roof. There are two storeys, an east front of three bays, and two wings at the rear. At the south end the roof is hipped above an open porch, and the windows are sashes.	II
Search house and clocking-on shed, Sedgwick Powder Works; 54.28111°N 2.75619°W	—	Mid-19th century	The building is in limestone with a single-hipped roof in Westmorland slate. The doorway is on the west side, there are small openings in the south wall, all of which are blocked, and the north and east walls are blind.	II
Workshop complex and Turbine, Sedgwick Powder Works; 54.28250°N 2.75618°W	—	Mid-19th century	The buildings are in limestone with Westmorland slate roofs. They form a U-shaped complex with a central range containing the turbine house and a workshop, and flanking wings containing workshops.	II
Walls, gate piers, fencing and gates, Sizergh Castle; 54.28445°N 2.77247°W		Late 19th or early 20th century	The walls, end, intermediate and gate piers at the entrance to the grounds are in limestone, and the gates and fencing are in timber. The gate piers have small ball finials.	II
