= Sizergh =

Historic house in Cumbria, England

Coordinates: 54°17′04″N 2°46′19″W

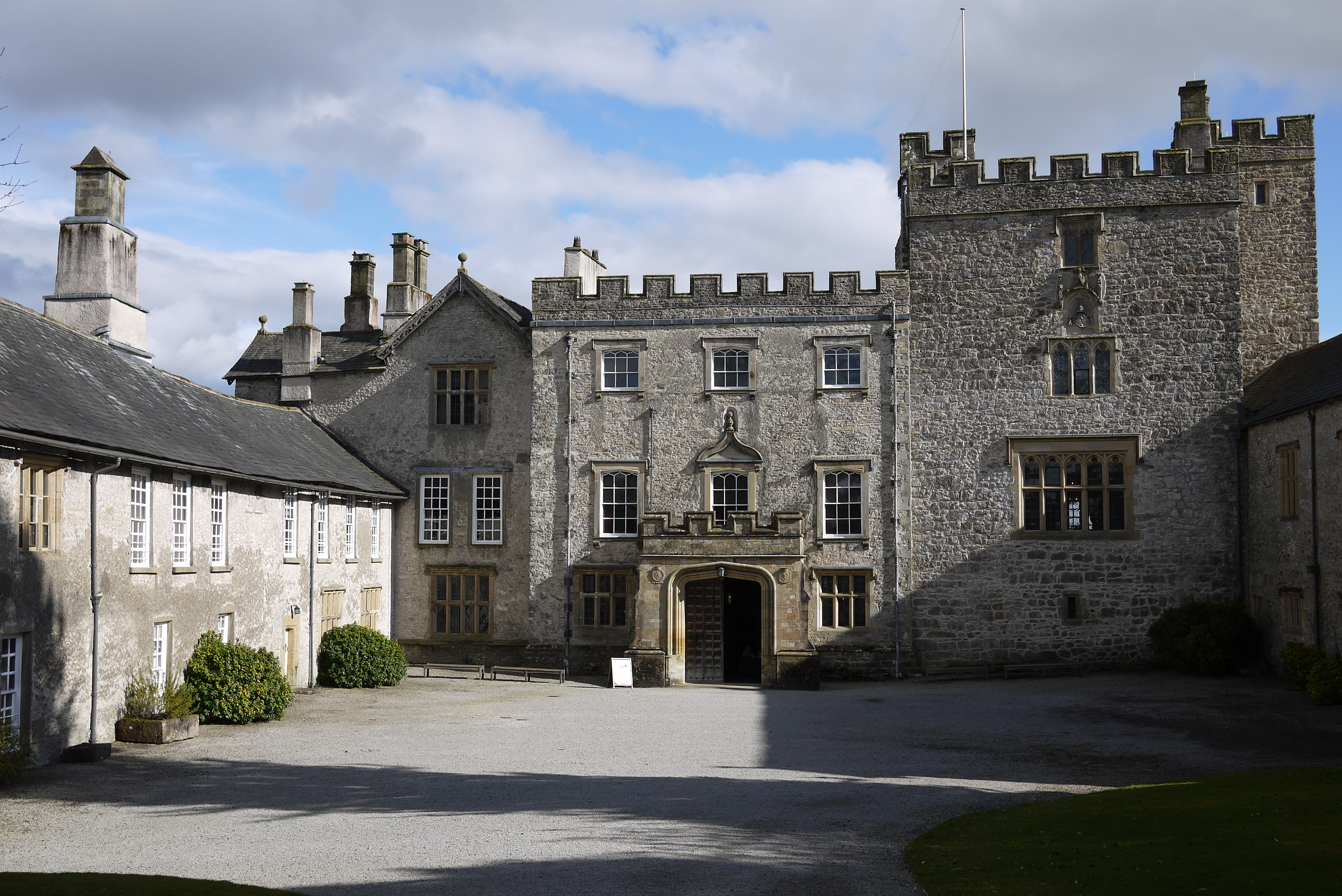
Sizergh Castle, solar tower and Tudor house

Sizergh Castle (/ˈsaɪzər/) is a stately home with garden and estate at Helsington in Cumbria, England, about 4 miles (6 km) south of Kendal. Located in historic Westmorland, the castle is a Grade I listed building. While remaining the home of the Hornyold-Strickland family, the castle with its garden and estate is in the care of the National Trust.

In 2016 the Sizergh estate was included in the newly extended Lake District National Park.

== Details ==
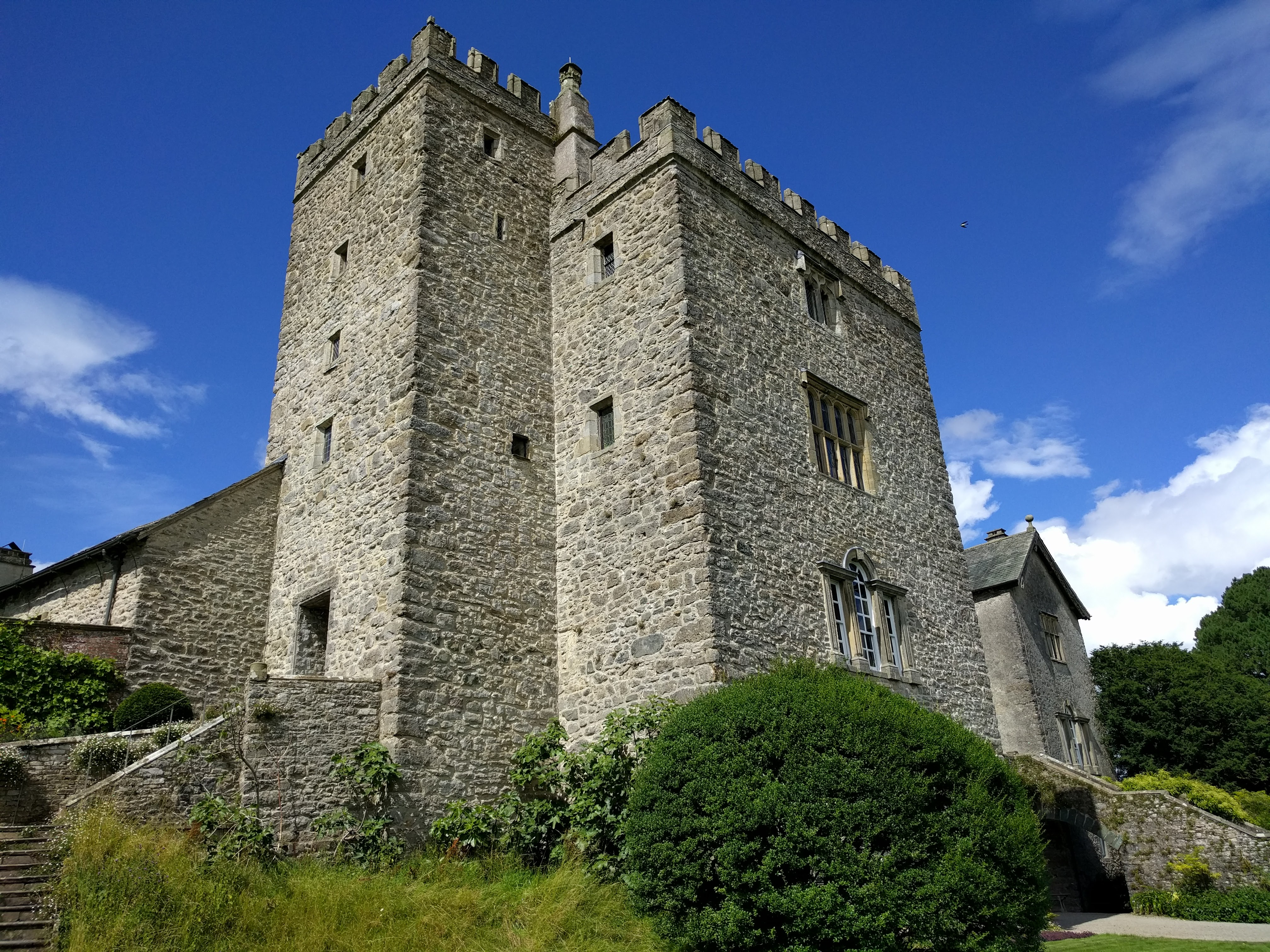
The tower at Sizergh Castle, as viewed from the South

The earliest part of the building is a tower of fourteenth or fifteenth century date.

=== Woodwork ===
Some of the early furnishings date from the time of Walter Strickland (1516–1569) who married Alice Tempest in 1560. She made inventories of the house after her husband's death. These mention three oak armchairs and three chests still in the house.

There are oak-panelled interiors, including the Inlaid Chamber, where the panelling is inlaid with floral and geometric patterns in pale poplar and dark bog-oak. The contents of the Inlaid Chamber were sold to the Victoria and Albert Museum in the 1890s and it was displayed as a reconstructed period room. The return of the panelling to its original location at Sizergh was advocated by among others Mark Girouard, an authority on England's country houses. The panelling returned in 1999 under a long-term loan. In 2017 it was reported that transfer of ownership to the National Trust had been made formal.

The bargeboards on the gables probably date from the seventeenth century.

=== Paintings ===
The Castle contains a variety of paintings, including the following:

- a collection of portraits of the Catholic Royal Stuart family reflects the Strickland family's links to the Jacobite court in exile at Saint-Germain-en-Laye in France. There are portraits by Alexis Simon Belle, painter in ordinary to James VII & II and the Old Pretender, of Queen Mary of Modena and her daughter Princess Louisa Maria.
- Strickland family portraits, including
  - works by local artist George Romney,
  - a portrait of Mrs. Anne Strickland (the artist's mother) by Harriet Strickland (1816–1903), and a portrait of Lady Edeline Sackville.

=== Portraits gallery ===
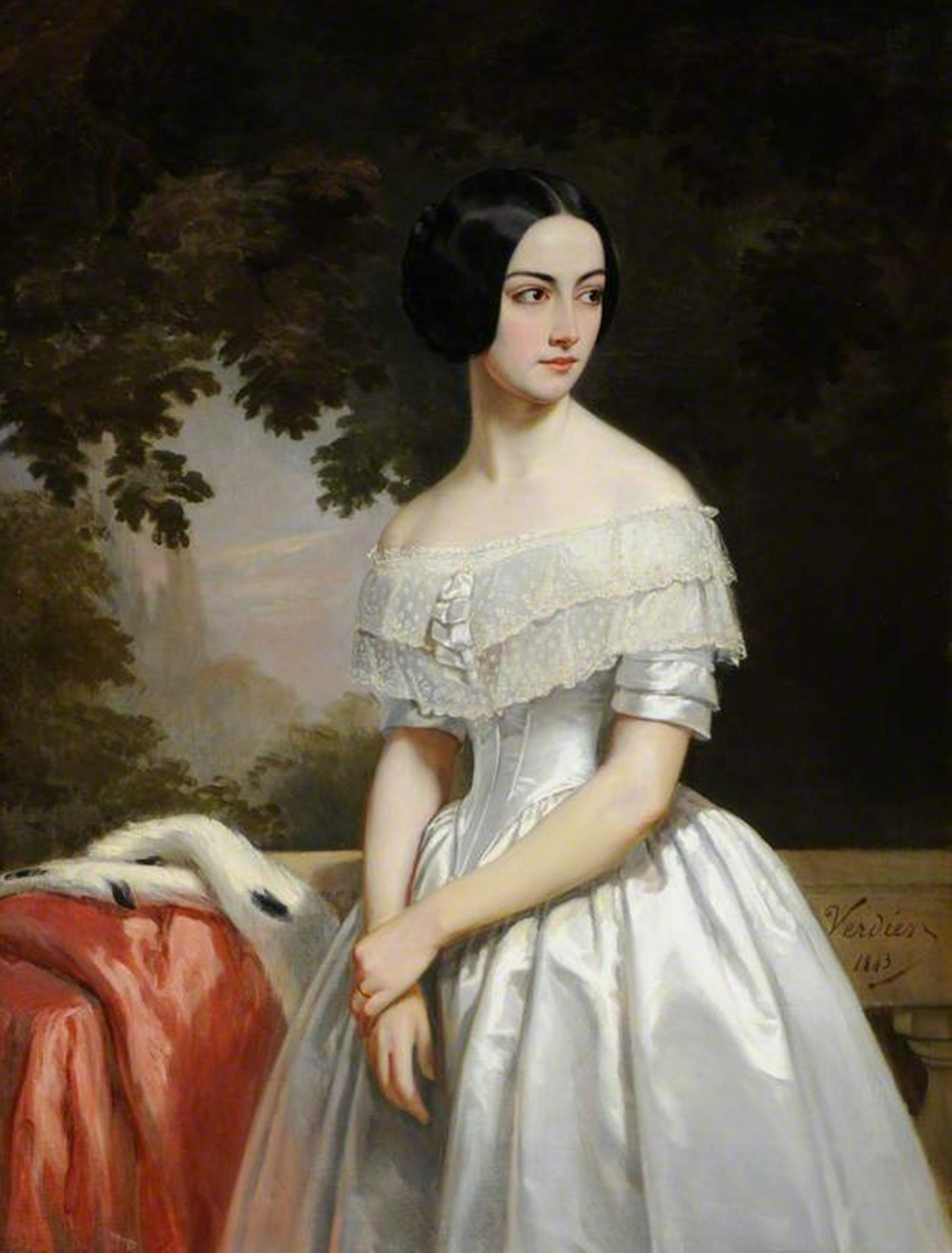
Mary Matthews (1823–1890), Mrs. Julien-Francois-Bertrand de La Chère

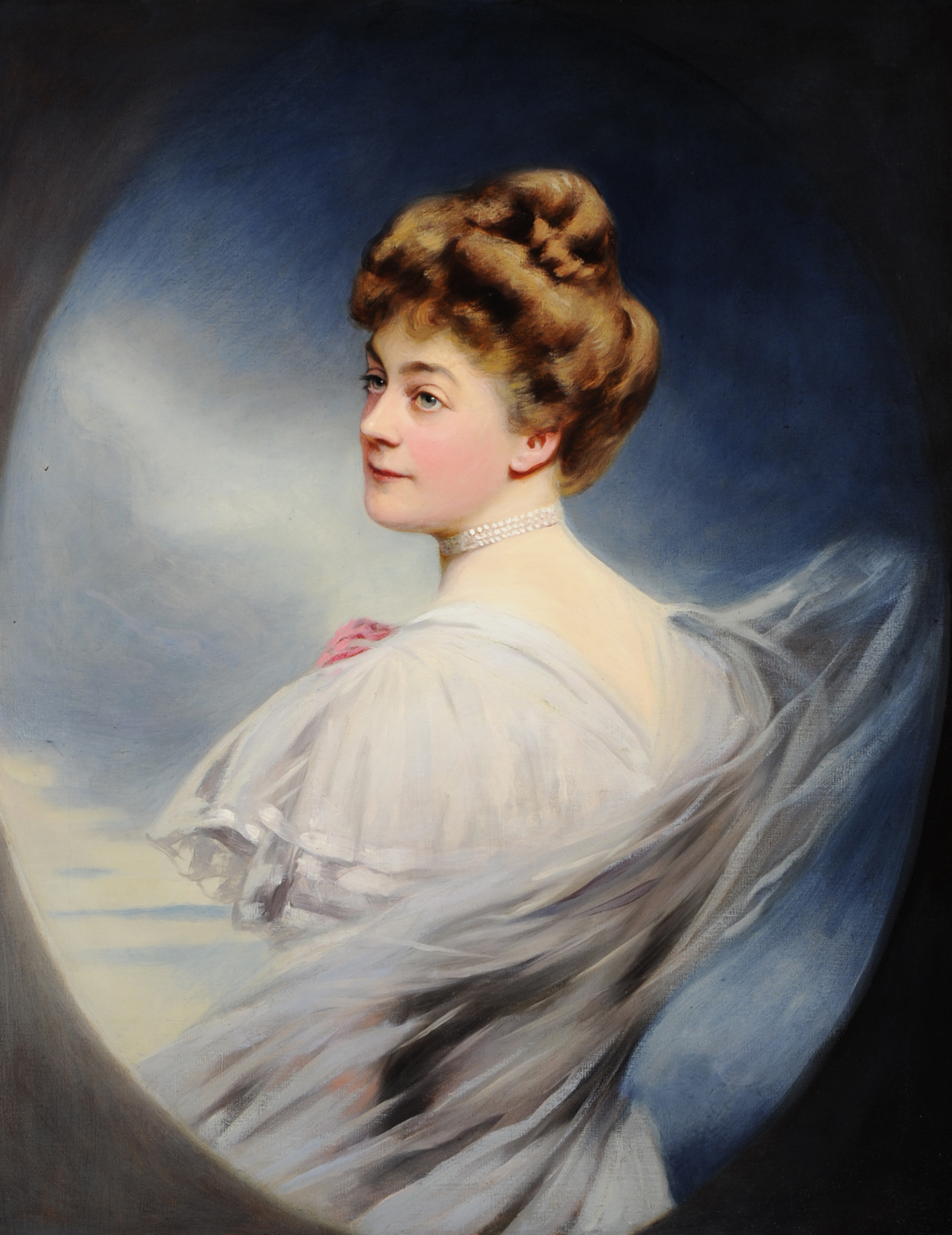
Marie Louise Geneviève Alice de La Chère (1856–1943), wife of Alfred Joseph Gandolfi-Hornyold (1850–1922)

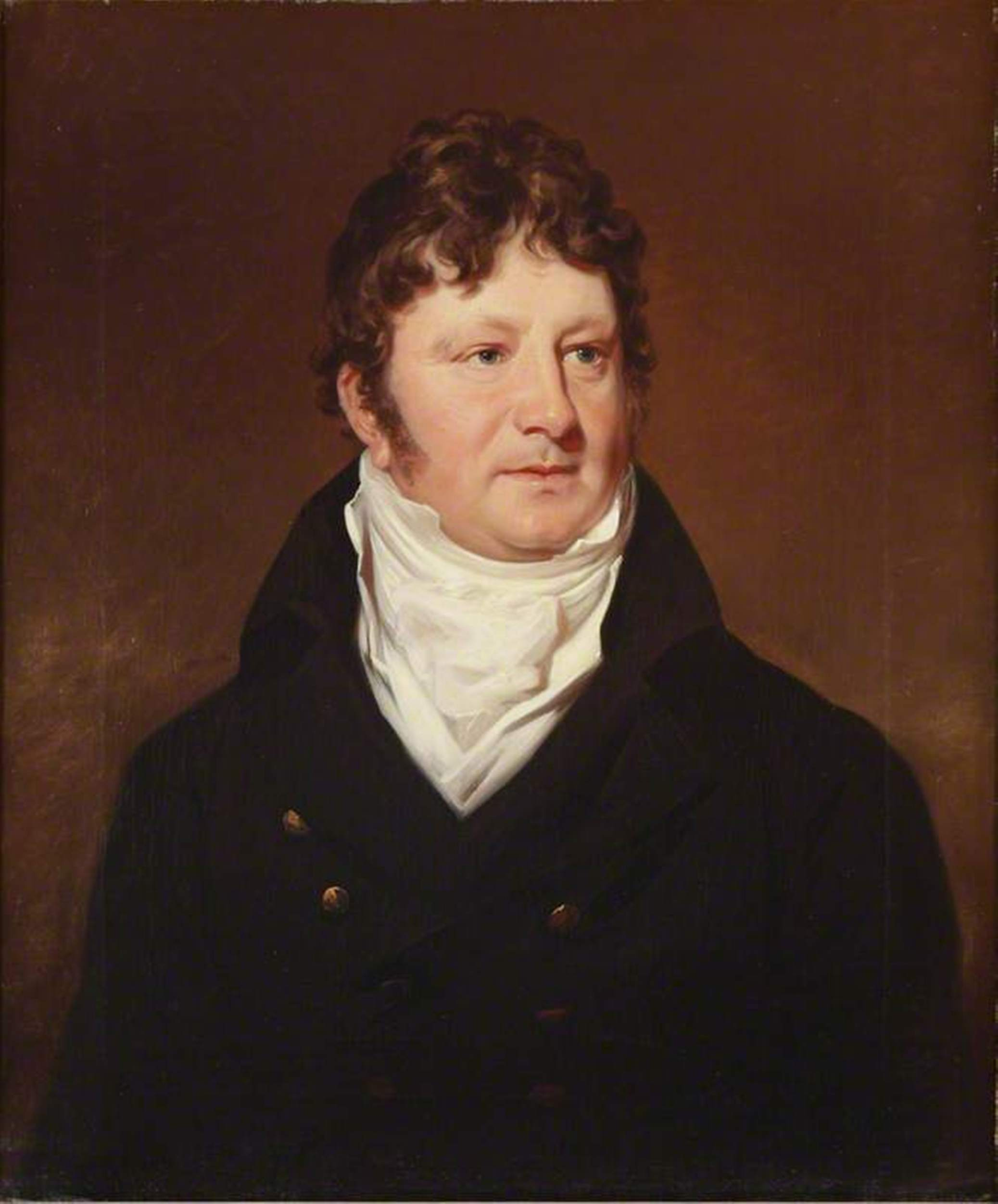
Thomas Strickland Standish (1763–1813), Lord of Standish Hall

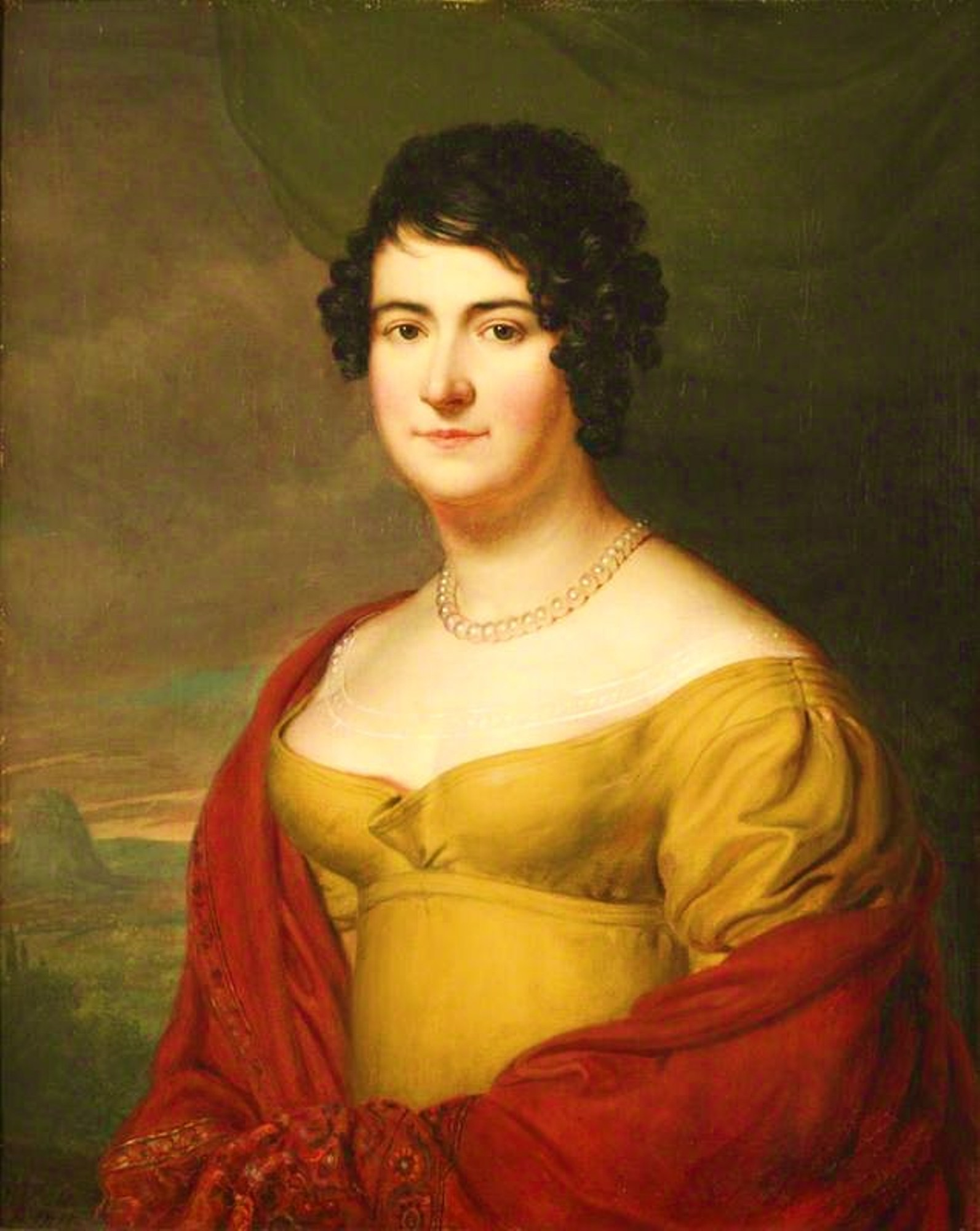
Henriette Rose Peronne de Sercey (1770–1849) by François Gérard

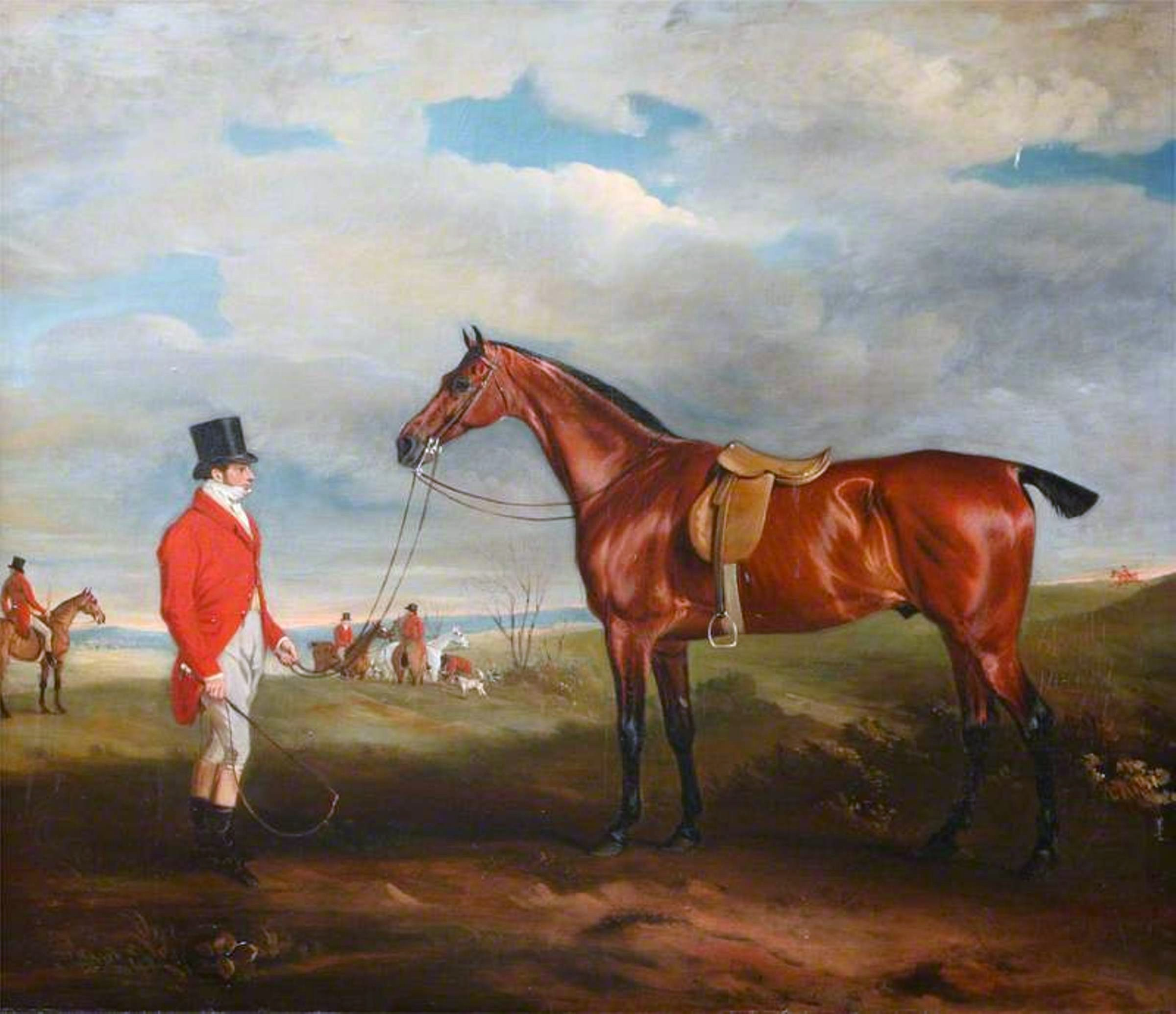
Thomas Strickland Standish of Sizergh (1792–1835)

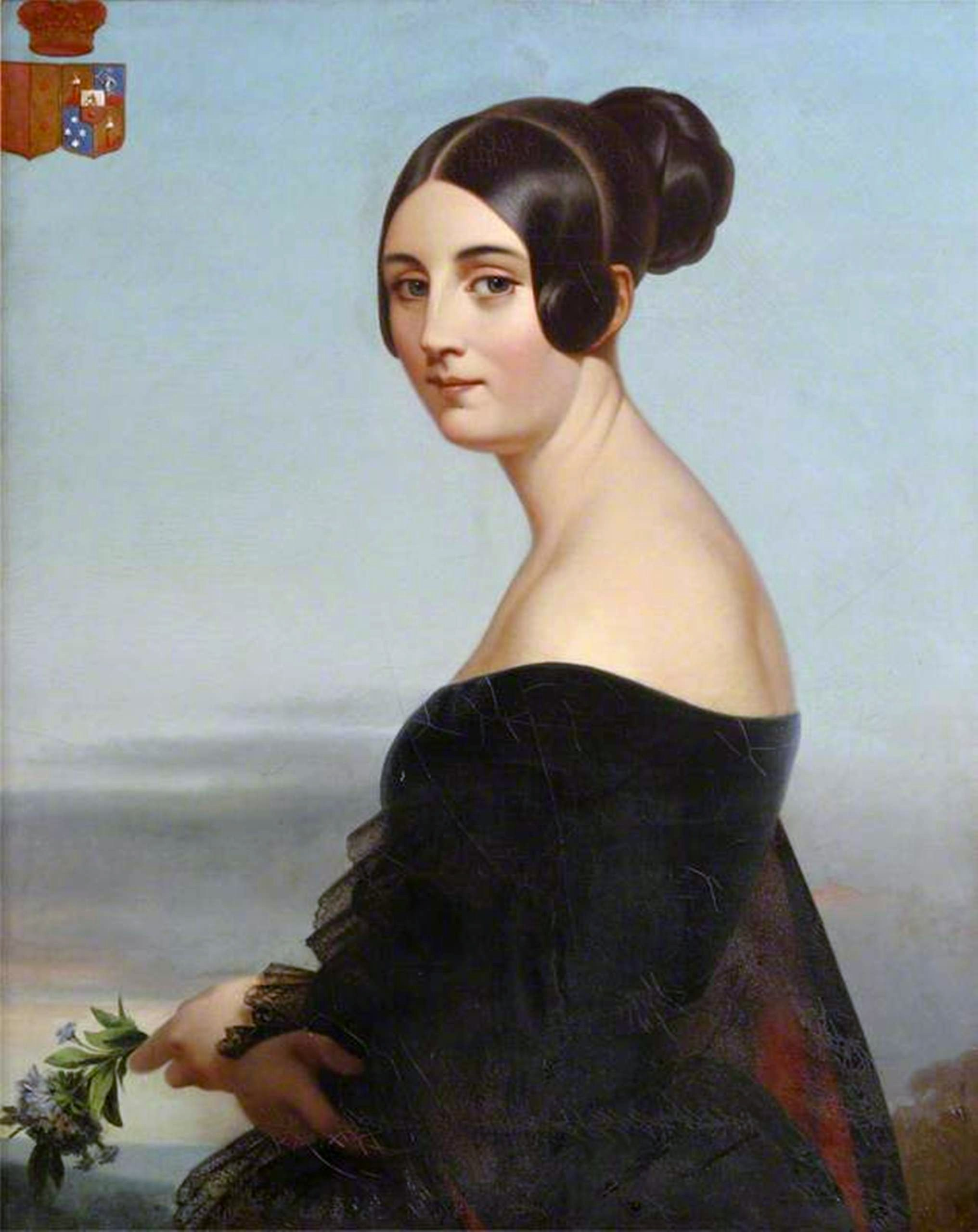
Ursule Ida de Finguerlin de Bischingen (1805–1846), Mrs. Thomas Strickland Standish of Sizergh

== History ==
The Deincourt family owned this land from the 1170s. On the marriage of Elizabeth Deincourt to Sir William de Stirkeland in 1239, the estate passed into the hands of what became the Strickland family, who owned it until it was gifted to the National Trust in 1950 by Lieutenant Commander Thomas Hornyold-Strickland, 7th Count della Catena, R.N., a grandson of the 1st Baron Strickland.

Katherine Parr, the sixth wife of Henry VIII and a relative of the Stricklands, is thought to have lived here after her first husband, Sir Edward Burgh, died in 1533. Katherine's second husband, Lord Latymer, was kin to the dowager Lady Strickland, Katherine Neville.

It was extended in Elizabethan times. Sir Thomas Strickland went into exile with King James II and VII.

Around 1770, the great hall was again expanded in the Georgian style.

== Gardens ==
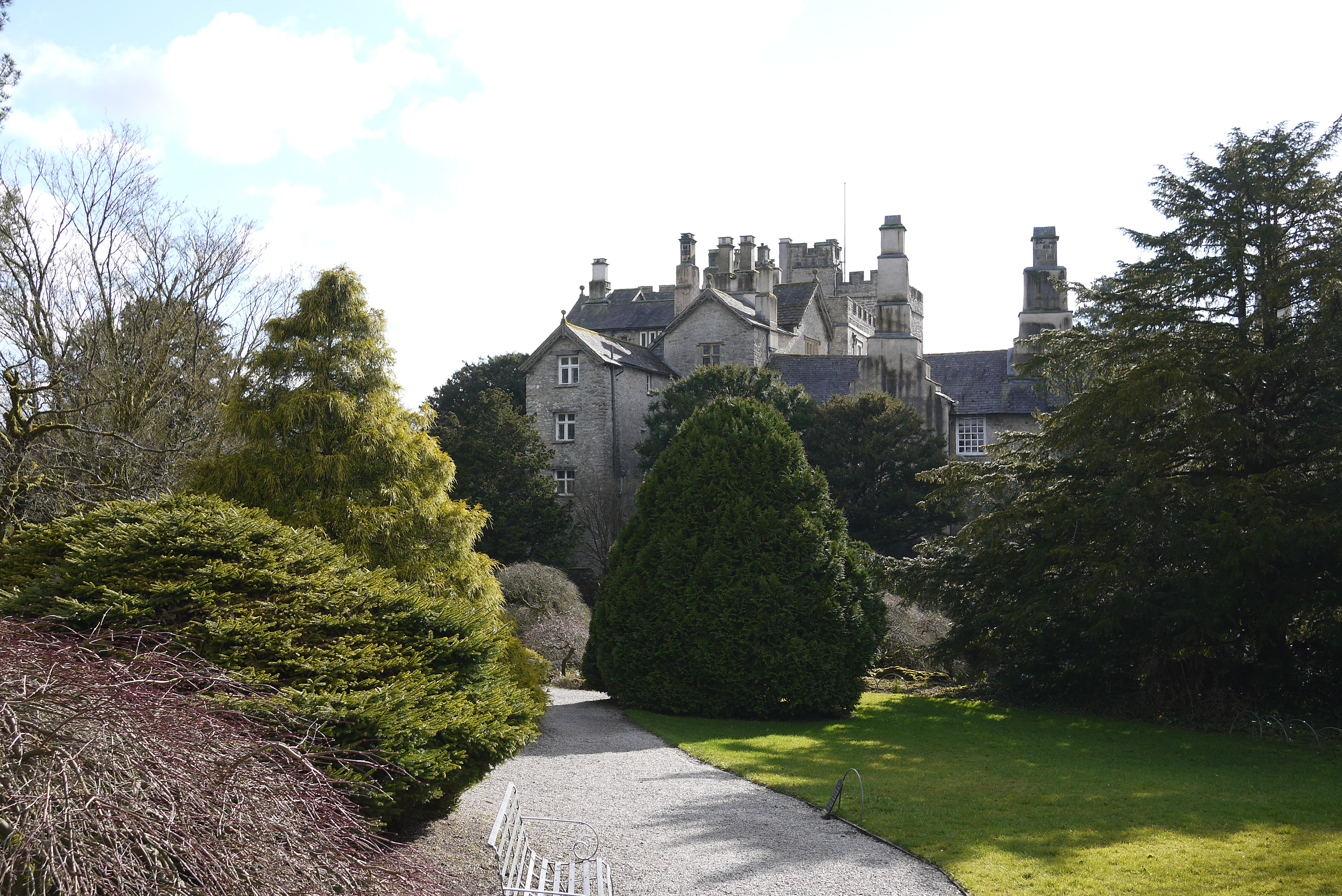
Sizergh Castle and part of the garden

The gardens are registered Grade II. There is a lake, a kitchen garden and a rock garden. The rock garden, constructed in the 1920s, is the largest limestone rock garden belonging to the National Trust.

Sizergh houses part of the National Collection of ferns, which are to be seen in the rock garden, the stumpery and the orchard.

== Estate ==
In 1336 a grant from Edward III allowed Sir Walter Strickland to enclose the land around Sizergh as his exclusive park.

The estate covers 647 hectares (1,600 acres).

=== Biodiversity ===
There are various types of habitat on the estate. For example, in 2014 it was reported that 35 ha of wetland habitat was being created in the Lyth Valley on the western edge of the estate. The project received funding from Natural England as part of a higher level stewardship scheme. It is hoped to attract bittern and other wildlife.

Sizergh has received support from the Morecambe Bay Nature Improvement Area which was launched in 2012. It received three years of government grant funding (2012–15). Projects continue under the auspices of the Morecambe Bay Partnership, a registered charity.

==== Birds ====
The Sizergh estate is a good place to see birds. For example, hawfinches are attracted to hornbeam trees around the main car park, and despite being a shy species can often be seen there in the spring.

==== Butterflies ====
Fritillary butterflies (including pearl-bordered and high brown fritillary) live on the estate.

=== Sizergh Fell ===
Sizergh Fell is a hill of 123 m (404 ft), about 1 km (0.62 mi) south-west of the castle. It is classified by the Database of British and Irish Hills as a Tump (Thirty and Upwards Metres Prominence). It has been suggested that a group of stones on the fell form the remains of a stone circle.

== Literary and media interest ==
The castle was featured in the ITV documentary Inside the National Trust.

The room known as the Inlaid Chamber is the subject of Letitia Elizabeth Landon's poetical illustration The Queen’s Room, Sizergh Hall, Westmorland to an engraving of a painting by Thomas Allom, published in Fisher's Drawing Room Scrap Book, 1836.

== See also ==
- Grade I listed buildings in Cumbria
- Listed buildings in Helsington
- Castles in Great Britain and Ireland
- List of historic houses in England
- Strickland (surname)
- Strickland-Constable baronets
- Gerald Strickland, 1st Baron Strickland

== Bibliography ==
- Taylor, Michael Waistell (1892). "Sizergh Castle". The Old Manorial Halls of Westmorland & Cumberland (Publications of the Cumberland and Westmorland Antiquarian and Archaeological Society, Extra Series, volume 8). Kendal: Cumberland and Westmorland Antiquarian and Archaeological Society. pp. 182–198.
- Taylor, Michael Waistell (1889). Sizergh, No. 1. 10 Transactions of the Cumberland and Westmorland Antiquarian & Archaeological Society. p. 48. doi:10.5284/1064162.
- Curwen, John F (1889). Sizergh, No. 2. 10 Transactions of the Cumberland and Westmorland Antiquarian & Archaeological Society. p. 66. doi:10.5284/1064161.
- Goodall, Ian (September 2002). "Privacy, Display and Over Extension: Walter Strickland's Rebuilding of Sizergh". The Antiquaries Journal. 82. The Society of Antiquaries of London: 197–245. doi:10.1017/S0003581500073789. S2CID 162616633.
- "Helsington: Sizergh Castle, Sizergh" (2007) 7 Transactions of the Cumberland & Westmorland Antiquarian & Archeological Society (Third Series) 257 doi:10.5284/1064350
- Emery, Anthony (1996). "Sizergh Castle". Greater Medieval Houses of England and Wales, 1300–1500. Vol. 1 (Northern England). Cambridge University Press. pp. 248–250. ISBN 978-0521497237.
- Fry, Plantagenet Somerset (1996). "Sizergh". Castles of Britain and Ireland. BCA by arrangement with David & Charles. p. 181. ISBN 978-0789202789.
- Strickland, Edeline Sackville (1898). Sizergh Castle, Westmoreland, and Notes on Twenty-five Generations of the Strickland Family. T Wilson.
