= Strickland House =

Strickland House may refer to:

in Australia

- Strickland House, Vaucluse

in the United States (by state then town)

- Strickland-Herold House, Miccosukee, Florida, listed on the National Register of Historic Places (NRHP)
- Strickland House (La Grange, Georgia), NRHP-listed in Troup County
- Collins-Odom-Strickland House, Macon, Georgia, NRHP-listed in Bibb County
- Hood-Strickland House Smithfield, North Carolina, NRHP-listed in Johnston County
- Strickland-Roberts Homestead, Kimberton, Pennsylvania, listed on the NRHP in northern Chester County]]
- William Strickland Row, Philadelphia, Pennsylvania, listed on the NRHP in Center City
- Strickland-Sawyer House, Waxahachie, Texas, listed on the National Register of Historic Places in Ellis County
