= Leap Wireless =

Former US telecommunication company

Leap Wireless International, Inc.
- Type: Public
- Traded as: Nasdaq: LEAP
- Industry: Telecommunications
- Founded: 1999; 27 years ago
- Defunct: March 14, 2014; 12 years ago
- Fate: Acquired by AT&T
- Successor: AT&T
- Headquarters: San Diego, California, United States
- Revenue: ▼US$ $694 million (Q4 2013)
- Net income: ▼US$ $160 million (Q4 2013)
- Subsidiaries: Cricket Wireless; Jump Mobile; Pocket Communications (76%)

Leap Wireless International, Inc. was a telecommunications operator that provided wireless services to approximately 4.6 million subscribers, the 5th largest, through its subsidiary, Cricket Communications, Inc. (Cricket Wireless). It was headquartered in San Diego, California. Leap Wireless and Cricket Wireless are now subsidiaries of AT&T.

Leap was founded in 1999 and was built on the premise of unlimited services with no contracts and no credit checks, providing access to wireless services to customers who couldn't otherwise afford it, didn't want the long-term commitment of a one- or two-year contract, or had a moral or religious objection to a credit check. A credit check is normally required for contract plans offered by telecommunications companies.

Leap has all-digital CDMA 1X, EV-DO and LTE networks that have expanded significantly in the past few years.

On July 12, 2013, AT&T agreed to acquire Leap Wireless for $1.2 billion. On March 13, 2014, the Federal Communications Commission approved the merger between AT&T and Leap Wireless. On the same day, Leap announced the completion of the acquisition by AT&T.

== Cricket Wireless ==
Cricket Communications, Inc. d.b.a. Cricket Wireless or simply Cricket, founded in 1999, was a subsidiary of Leap Wireless International, Inc. prior to Leap's acquisition by AT&T. It provides prepaid wireless services in the United States.

== Jump Mobile ==
Jump Mobile
- Type: Private
- Industry: Telecommunications
- Founded: 2005; 21 years ago
- Defunct: February 26, 2010
- Headquarters: San Diego, California, United States
- Parent: Leap Wireless
- Website: jumpmobile.com

Jump Mobile was a subsidiary of Leap Wireless International, Inc. The pre-paid wireless service was not a mobile virtual network operator (MVNO), as it used its parent company’s CDMA 1xEV-DO network to provide pre-paid wireless services to its customers. Jump Mobile launched in its first market in 2005, and discontinued services and operations in 2010.

Jump Mobile offered prepaid mobile phone services to customers in 25 U.S. states. Leap Wireless retired the Jump Mobile brand on February 26, 2010, and migrated all customers to its Cricket Wireless "Pay Go" service.

Jump Mobile's features allowed customers unlimited incoming calls from any country, outgoing calls within the coverage area for a per-minute charge, and unlimited text messaging service within the United States. International text messages and calls were available for additional charges. Through the Cricket/Leap Wireless Network, coverage was about half of the continental United States, with broadband coverage in several metropolitan areas.

The pre-paid service included voicemail, caller ID, call waiting, three-way calling, directory assistance, ringtones, games, and wallpapers.

The terms and conditions for Jump Mobile required customers to maintain paid credit on their accounts. If all funds and minutes expired, after a sixty-day grace period service lapsed, customers lost their telephone numbers. The company offered both "service credit" and "Airtime To Go"; the former expired within a fixed period that began when the credit was applied and that varied based on the amount. "Airtime to Go" had the same range of expiration periods (from 15 to 100 days), but the countdown to expiration didn't begin until the airtime was activated.

== History ==
Leap Wireless was founded in 1999, spun off as an independently traded company from San Diego–based Qualcomm. Leap was started with the idea to provide affordable wireless services to a wide range of customers, without credit checks or long-term commitments. Under that principle, it founded Cricket Communications in 1999 and launched in Chattanooga, Tennessee that year.

During this time, Leap also operated all-digital wireless services in Mexico and Chile under partnership with other companies. However, in May 2000, Leap Wireless sold its Chilean wireless operator Smartcom PCS to Endesa. Two years later, in March 2002, Leap also sold its 20 percent stake in Mexican Wireless carrier Pegaso PCS to Telefónica Moviles.

=== Financial concerns in 2007 ===
On September 4, 2007, MetroPCS announced a proposal that MetroPCS and Leap Wireless could merge into a single wireless company. However, the proposal was withdrawn less than two months later, on November 1, 2007. Due to LEAP's worsening financial situation in later years, some business analysts continued to anticipate that a merger would take place.

- On September 10, 2007, Leap's Chief Financial Officer Amin Khalifa, resigned.
- Two months later, on November 9, Leap announced that it would restate its financial statements for fiscal years 2004, 2005, and 2006, and for the first and second quarters of 2007.

On December 28, 2007, the company filed restatements of its earnings with the Securities and Exchange Commission; Leap reported that it had overstated its income by $22.5 million and service revenue by $7.5m between 2004 and 2007. During the period, Leap had reported an operating profit of $102.2m and $3.09 billion in service revenue.

=== 2010-2014 ===
On February 1, 2010, it was reported that Leap was exploring a sale of the company to a larger rival company. Media reports indicated that talks had been held with Verizon Wireless and AT&T Mobility. In August of the same year, Leap Wireless entered into a 5-year wholesale agreement MVNO with Sprint Nextel, which allowed Cricket to offer its products and services over Sprint's 3G network throughout the United States.

- On March 31, 2012, Cricket Wireless, part of Leap Wireless International Inc., announced plans to become the first pre-paid provider with an iPhone 4 and iPhone 4S in its month-to-month service offer on June 22, 2012.
- On July 12, 2013, AT&T agreed to buy Leap Wireless for $1.2 billion.
- On March 13, 2014, the Federal Communications Commission approved the merger between AT&T and Leap Wireless.

== Executive Team prior to AT&T acquisition ==
- S. Douglas (Doug) Hutcheson, President, Chief Executive Officer and Director
- Jerry V. Elliott, Executive Vice President and Chief Financial Officer
- Rob Strickland, Executive Vice President and Chief Technical Officer
- Robert Irving, Jr., Senior Vice President and General Counsel
- Leonard Stephens, Senior Vice President, Human Resources

== Coverage Areas ==
Cricket subscribers, prior to the AT&T acquisition, were previously covered by Cricket's own network, along with that of Sprint for native CDMA coverage with voice, text, and data available on these networks. When outside the Cricket or Sprint coverage areas, customers roamed on the Verizon Wireless network and had voice and text services only.

Following the AT&T acquisition, in 2015, the CDMA network was decommissioned and CDMA devices ceased functioning. Presently, customers are covered by AT&T's national LTE/NR network. This network supports LTE on bands 2, 4, 5, 12, 14, 17, 29, 30, 46, and 66; and NR on bands 2, 5, 77, 258, and 260.
