= Frederick G. Strickland =

19th-century American Christian socialist

Frederick Guy Strickland was a 19th-century American Christian socialist. He was an activist in the Social Democratic Party from its inception and was friends with Eugene V. Debs.

== Beliefs ==
Strickland believed in social service as a method of redefining the Christian religion, as a method of "Social Redemption", under the presumption that it could become the "most evangelical religion". He would lecture at colleges to express his views, with at least the Religious Association of Defiance College being one.
