= Thrimby =

Hamlet in Cumbria, England

Coordinates: 54.578°N 2.69°W

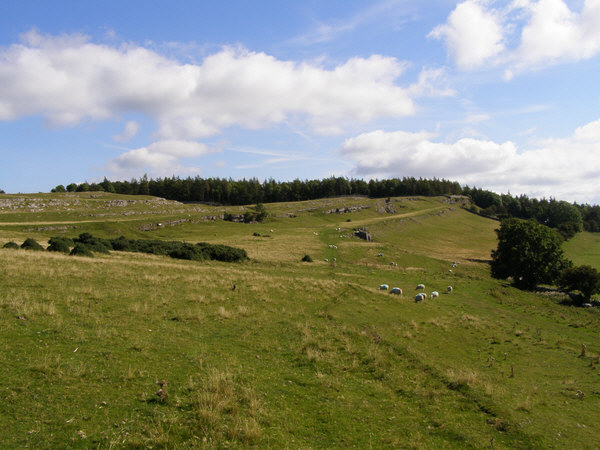
- Out Scar

- Location in Eden, Cumbria Location within Cumbria
- Population: 30 (2001)
- OS grid reference: NY5520
- Civil parish: Little Strickland
- Unitary authority: Westmorland and Furness
- Ceremonial county: Cumbria
- Region: North West
- Country: England
- Sovereign state: United Kingdom
- Post town: PENRITH
- Postcode district: CA10
- Dialling code: 01931
- Police: Cumbria
- Fire: Cumbria
- Ambulance: North West
- UK Parliament: Westmorland and Lonsdale

Thrimby is a hamlet and former civil parish, now in the parish of Little Strickland, in Westmorland and Furness, Cumbria, England. In 2001 the population of the civil parish of Thrimby was 30. The population measured at the 2011 Census was less than 100. Details are included in the parish of Great Strickland. It has a Grade 2* farmhouse called Thrimby Hall, as seen in series 4 of the BBC Two fly-on-the-wall farming documentary "This Farming Life".

== History ==
Thrimby was a chapelry with 2 townships within Morland parish. It became a civil parish in 1866. On 1 April 2019 the parish was merged with Little Strickland.

On 23 October 1970, the nine-mile Tebay to Thrimby section of the M6 was opened, built by Christiani-Shand. The section terminated on the A6. The next junction further north would be at Penrith (A66).

== See also ==
- Listed buildings in Thrimby
- List of English and Welsh endowed schools (19th century)
