= Great Strickland =

Village and civil parish in Cumbria, England

Coordinates: 54.599°N 2.682°W

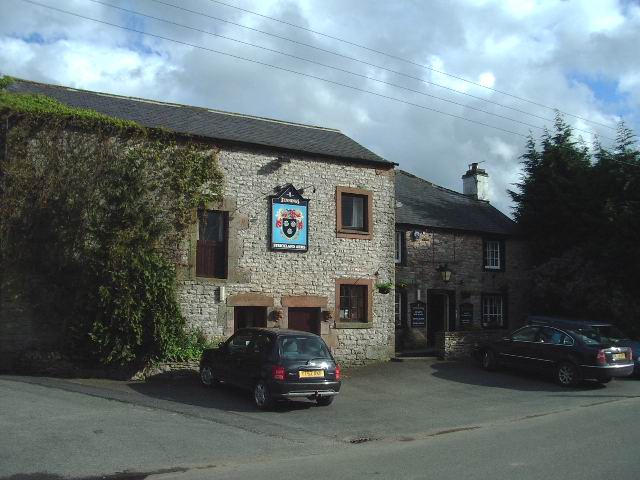
- Strickland Arms

- Location within Cumbria
- Population: 370 (2011(including Little Strickland and Thrimby))
- OS grid reference: NY5522
- Civil parish: Great Strickland
- Unitary authority: Westmorland and Furness
- Ceremonial county: Cumbria
- Region: North West
- Country: England
- Sovereign state: United Kingdom
- Post town: PENRITH
- Postcode district: CA10
- Dialling code: 01931
- Police: Cumbria
- Fire: Cumbria
- Ambulance: North West
- UK Parliament: Westmorland and Lonsdale

Great Strickland is a village and civil parish in the Eden Valley between the Cumbrian mountains in the west and the Pennines in the east. It is 5 miles (8.0 km) south east of Penrith, and is in the former county of Westmorland. At the 2011 Census Great Strickland was grouped with Little Strickland, itself enlarged to include Thrimby after 2001, to give a total population of 370. The equivalent figure from the 2001 census was 342.

The sandstone village church is dedicated to Saint Barnabas and was constructed in 1872. It has a bell turret.

To the west of the village lies the River Leith, the West Coast Main Line and the M6 Motorway. To the south lies the small settlement of Little Strickland.

Strickland Coat of Arms

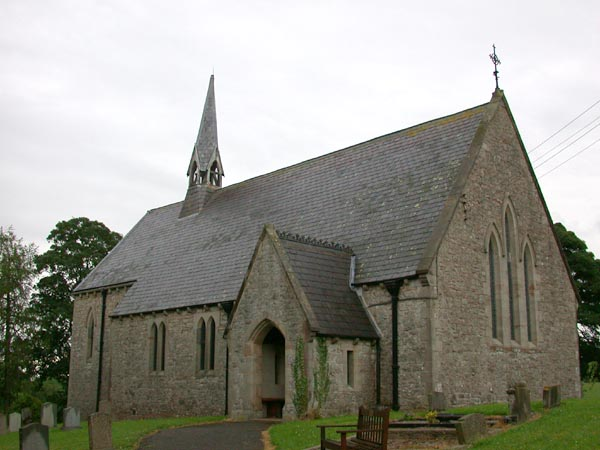
St Barnabas' Church, Great Strickland

== History ==
The village gets its name from a Scandinavian term for pastureland around the 9th and 10th centuries.

In 1179, the local heiress Christian de Leteham married Walter de Castlecarrock and he changed his name to de Strikeland.

== See also ==
- Listed buildings in Great Strickland
- Strickland (surname)
