= Cricket Wireless =

American wireless service provider

Cricket Wireless LLC
- Type: Subsidiary
- Industry: Wireless telecommunications
- Founded: March 17, 1999; 27 years ago in Chicago, Illinois, United States
- Founders: Leap Wireless
- Headquarters: Atlanta, Georgia, United States
- Number of locations: 5,000 retail stores (2019)
- Area served: United States
- Key people: Angela Rittgers (president); Matt Haymons (vice president & CIO); Tiffany Baehman (vice president of sales & distribution); Wendy Martin (vice president & CMO)
- Products: Wireless; Mobile phone
- Services: Mobile communications
- Number of employees: 221
- Parent: Leap Wireless (1999–2014); AT&T (2014–present)
- Website: www.cricketwireless.com

Cricket Wireless LLC is an American prepaid wireless service provider, wholly owned by AT&T. It provides wireless services to 13 million subscribers in the United States as of 2022. Cricket Wireless was founded in March 1999 by Leap Wireless International. AT&T acquired Leap Wireless International in March 2014, and later merged Cricket Wireless operations with Aio Wireless. Cricket Wireless competes primarily against T-Mobile's Metro by T-Mobile and Verizon's Total Wireless in the prepaid wireless segment.

== History ==
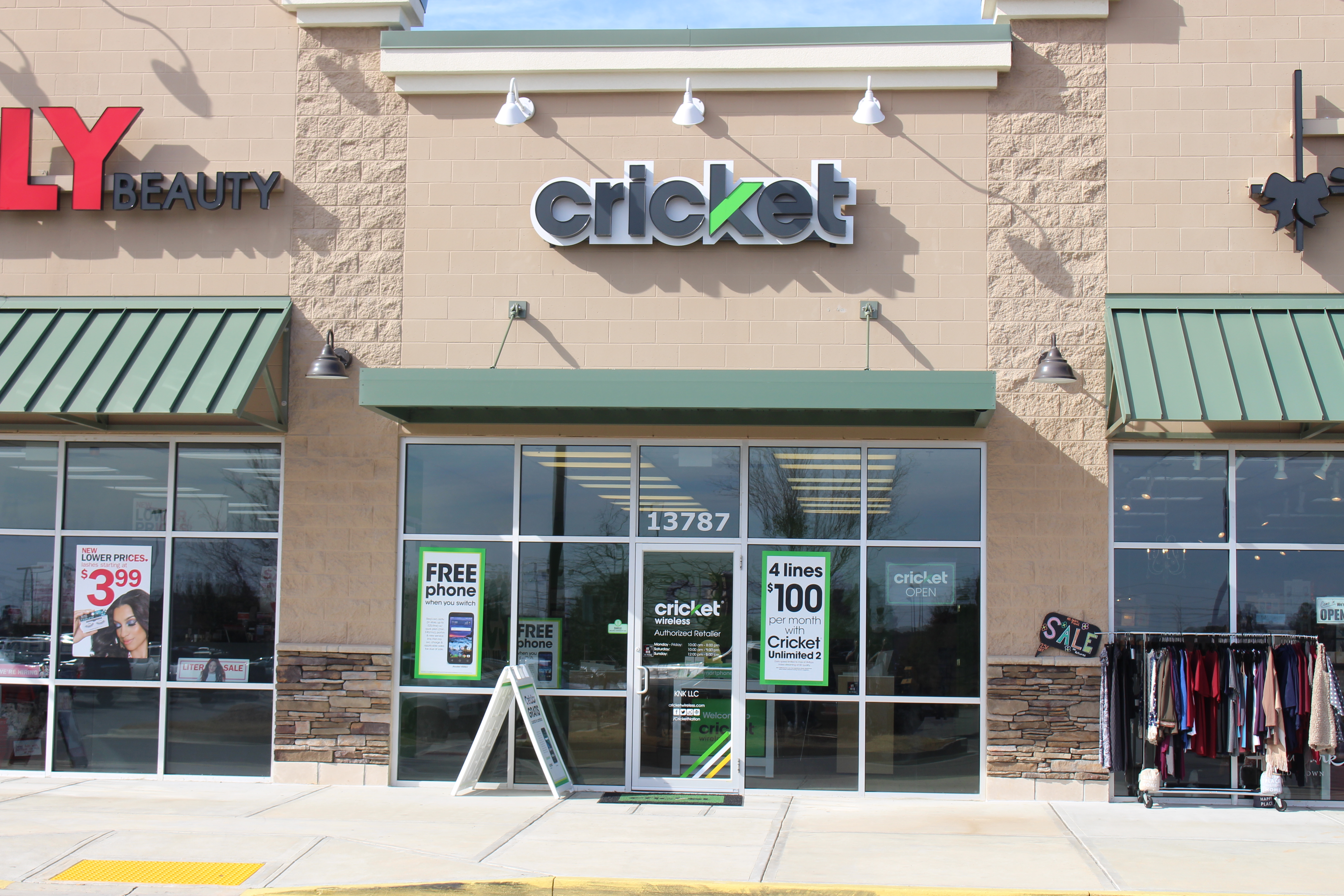
Typical Cricket retail store in Thomasville, Georgia

Former Cricket Wireless logo, before acquisition by AT&T

Cricket Wireless was founded in March 1999 by Leap Wireless International. AT&T acquired Leap Wireless International in March 2014 and merged Cricket Wireless with Aio Wireless. Before AT&T's acquisition, the company had 4.5 million subscribers.

Cricket's first market was Chattanooga, Tennessee, in 1999 and through much of its early growth became known as a network focused on small, rural markets.

In September 2007, MetroPCS, Cricket Wireless's competing carrier at the time, announced a $5.3 billion bid to merge with Leap Wireless. Leap informally rejected the bid less than two weeks later. MetroPCS officially withdrew the bid less than two months later. In December 2007, Cricket acquired Hargray Communications Group's wireless telecommunications business.

In September 2008, Cricket and MetroPCS entered into a 10-year roaming agreement covering both companies' existing and future markets. The companies also entered into a spectrum exchange agreement covering licenses in certain markets. In November 2008, they launched "Premium Extended Coverage", a roaming partnership with 14 wireless companies. In August 2010, Cricket and Sprint signed a five-year wholesale agreement (MVNO) which allowed Cricket to utilize Sprint's nationwide 3G EVDO network in the United States.

In late 2010 at CES 2011, Cricket unveiled Muve Music, the carrier's own music streaming service alongside the $199 Samsung Suede SCH-r710 which was the first phone to support Muve Music and included a 4GB SD card to store music on. Muve Music was initially included in its own $55 plan but was later expanded to all plans as a $5 add-on before being included in all plans free-of-charge. The music service was deemed by Cricket as a major success and credited with helping drive up at least 100,000 new subscribers in the course of a few months. Muve Music originally required an SD card with a capacity of at least 4 gigabytes to download music, the ability to do so without an SD card was introduced in version 4.0 of Muve Music but required an internal storage capacity of at least 4 gigabytes. Muve Music 4.0 was officially unveiled on the Samsung Galaxy S III, Samsung Galaxy S4 and Samsung Galaxy Discover while the Samsung Galaxy Admire would ship with version 3.5 but was upgradeable to version 4.0. At its peak, the service was the biggest music streaming service in regards to paying customers with a customer base of 2.3 million users and was hinted in making appearances in international markets such as in Brazil. The fate of the service was put in doubt after AT&T acquired Leap Wireless (parent company of Cricket), and was rumored to be merged with the AT&T Beats Music service or possibly left as-is. AT&T expressed a lack of interest in maintaining the service and discontinued it in May 2014. AT&T made Muve Music inaccessible to any new phone purchased after the merger but allowed legacy handsets bought before the merger to access the service. The service was acquired by Deezer for $100 million and formally shut down on February 7, 2015. Deezer offered all Cricket customers a discounted $6 plan which was made available on January 31, 2015.

In July 2013, AT&T agreed to buy Cricket Wireless for $1.2 billion. The FCC approved the acquisition between AT&T and Leap Wireless in March 2014. In doing so, AT&T merged its own Aio Wireless prepaid brand into Cricket to form the "New Cricket". Cricket Wireless began a gradual shutdown of its CDMA network in March 2015 before a total shutdown in September 2015 and moved all users over to the AT&T GSM network. All users were required to buy new devices in order to be able to maintain connectivity to the new Cricket network. Cricket Wireless, alongside AT&T, shut down its 2G networks on December 31, 2016. Customers with legacy handsets were also required to upgrade their devices to use on newer networks.

Cricket Wireless deployed its 5G network nationwide on August 21, 2020. Shortly afterward, Cricket announced the shutdown of its 3G network starting in February 2022.

== Offerings ==
Cricket offers a variety of phones including most of the latest iPhone and Android models. Like typical prepaid carriers, they offer feature phones, inexpensive smartphones, and phones under their own brand like the Cricket Icon.

As of 2025, Cricket Wireless offers a variety of financing options for phones and feature add-ons such as international calling to over 200 countries and Cricket Passport for international roaming.

== Controversies ==
=== CDMA phones ===
In May 2015, Cricket Wireless was sued for selling CDMA phones that would not work after the merger with AT&T. The lawsuit alleged that Cricket knew at the time of the merger with AT&T that any devices sold would soon need to be replaced because the AT&T network did not support CDMA devices and yet continued to do so. The lawsuit further stated that "AT&T and Cricket had decided to discontinue the CDMA network and require Cricket customers to use AT&T's GSM cellular network" yet continued to sell the devices, and due to the Cricket policy of not unlocking cellphones at that time, "the cellphones became useless and worthless." The court ruled in favor of the plaintiff and Cricket was forced to either unlock the locked cell phones, provide 1 month of free service on the 1GB plan for former customers and waive the activation fee, or provide current customers with one extra gigabyte of data for four months.

A similar lawsuit was filed by the Attorney General of Maryland in June 2020 for violating the state's consumer protection act.

=== STARTTLS stripping attack ===
In October 2014, Cricket Wireless (and its parent company, AT&T) came under scrutiny for intercepting and modifying its customers' email traffic to downgrade and prevent encryption of the conversation and its metadata. An engineer at a digital security and privacy firm, Golden Frog, first noticed the issue in September 2013 via his Aio Wireless connection (later acquired by Cricket). Upon further investigation by the privacy firm in June 2014, Golden Frog determined that Cricket masked the STARTTLS command in email server responses, thereby "putting its customers at serious risk by inhibiting their ability to protect online communications." In October, a Washington Post investigation revealed that "Cricket did not address repeated questions about the issue and did not alert customers, many of whom rely on Cricket as their sole Internet service, that they would not be able to protect their e-mails from prying eyes. AT&T, which absorbed Cricket when it acquired Leap Wireless that spring, did not respond to a request for comment." The EFF also published a technical analysis condemning ISPs like Cricket for tampering with customer internet traffic.

== See also ==
- AT&T Mobility, another subsidiary of AT&T
