= Bill Strickland (baseball) =

American baseball player (1908-2000)

- Pitcher
- Born: March 29, 1908; Ray City, Georgia, U.S.
- Died: January 26, 2000 (aged 91); Lakeland, Florida, U.S.
- Batted: Right Threw: Right

MLB debut
- July 16, 1937, for the St. Louis Browns

Last MLB appearance
- September 8, 1937, for the St. Louis Browns

MLB statistics
- Win–loss record: 0–0
- Earned run average: 5.91
- Strikeouts: 6
- Stats at Baseball Reference

Teams
- St. Louis Browns (1937)

William Goss Strickland (March 29, 1908 – January 26, 2000) was an American Major League Baseball pitcher who played for the St. Louis Browns in 1937.
