= Margaret Strickland (writer) =

- Born: circa 1880
- Died: 1970
- Spouse: Richard Hugh Worley
- Writing career
- Genres: magazine stories, novels

Margaret Strickland (c. 1880–1970) was an English writer of magazine stories and novels for adults and children, including the Michael Gerahty detective novels. Her works and papers have been collected by New York University's Fales Library.

== Family ==
Strickland was a great niece of the famous literary Strickland sisters. Her grandfather, Thomas Strickland, was the youngest brother of Agnes, Jane and Elizabeth Strickland, and Catherine Traill. Agnes was the best known of the family and is remembered for her work The Lives of the Queens of England (1840–48). Strickland suggests that Thomas was viewed as the black sheep of the family. He is barely mentioned in either of the biographies of Agnes Strickland. Several of Thomas' siblings, including Catherine and another brother, Samuel, migrated to Canada, where Catherine wrote a number of books and novels, and Samuel founded the city of Lakeside.

Strickland had two sisters, both noted for their ability in drawing animals and staid, country scenes. Agnes Strickland is remembered for her botanical illustrations, and Mary Diana (later Diana Mallet-Veale) moved to Rhodesia and became well known for her illustrations of native life.

Strickland married Richard Hugh Worley, son of R.J. Worley of Essex, in 1908.

== Works ==
With her sisters Agnes and Mary Diana, Strickland was the editor the sisters' homemade magazine, publishing twelve issues of the Illustrated Amateur Magazine from 1897 to 1899.

Strickland's adult stories are often of a romantic nature, involving the upper and middle classes and incorporating mystery or suspense.
