= Michael Strickland (physicist) =

American theoretical physicist

Michael Strickland is an American theoretical physicist who received his PhD from Duke University in 1997. His specialty is the physics of the Quark-Gluon Plasma which is an extreme state of matter which filled the entire Universe until about 10^{−5} seconds after the Big Bang. He has contributed to calculation of the quark-gluon plasma (QGP) equation of state, QGP plasma instabilities/thermalization, reformulation of relativistic hydrodynamics for far-from-equilibrium systems, and quarkonium suppression in the QGP, etc.
