= Bill Strickland (footballer, born 1882) =

Australian rules footballer

Personal information
- Full name: William Strickland
- Born: 27 May 1882; Sebastopol, Victoria
- Died: 8 November 1958 (aged 76); Williams, Western Australia
- Original team: Sebastopol

Playing career^{1}
| Years | Club | Games (Goals) |
| 1900 | Carlton | 1 (0) |
- ^{1} Playing statistics correct to the end of 1900.

William Strickland (27 May 1882 – 8 November 1958) was an Australian rules footballer who played with Carlton in the Victorian Football League (VFL).
