= Walter Strickland (died 1569) =

English Politician

Walter Strickland (c. 1516 - 8 April 1569) was an English Member of parliament, representing Westmorland in 1563.

His family home was Sizergh Castle, near Kendal, built c. 1350 by an ancestor; a Strickland still lives in the castle although it is now under the care of the National Trust.

Parliament of England
Preceded by Lancelot Lancaster; Thomas Warcop	Member of parliament for Westmorland; 1562-1563; With: Gerard Lowther	Succeeded by Alan Bellingham; Thomas Warcop
