= Peter Strickland (music executive) =

Peter Strickland in an American music executive. He spent nearly 30 years working for Warner Music Group (WMG), most recently as chief marketing officer of Warner Music Nashville.

== Career ==
Strickland's first job in the entertainment industry was at Strawberries Records and Tapes' warehouse, Cambridge One One Stop in Framingham, Massachusetts as a buyer.

He first joined Warner Music Group in 1998 as a field representative for Warner Elektra Atlantic (WEA) Distribution in Boston, Massachusetts. In 1995, Strickland accepted a position with WMG as regional sales manager for Warner Bros. Records in Nashville. Strickland was promoted to national sales director before serving as vice president of sales and marketing, and senior vice president of brand management & sales.

In 2013, Strickland was appointed to executive vice president and general manager of Warner Music Nashville, where he also served as the general manager of LoudMouth Entertainment, Warner Music Nashville's comedy imprint. As part of LoudMouth Entertainment, Strickland served as executive producer on Jimmy Fallon’s 2013 GRAMMY-winning comedy album, Blow Your Pants Off.

In September 2017, Strickland announced he would step down from his role as Chief Marketing Officer and stayed at the company in a consulting role through October.

While at Warner Music, Strickland worked with artists such as Blake Shelton, Faith Hill, Sheryl Crow, Big & Rich, Jeff Foxworthy, Larry the Cable Guy, Bill Engvall, Jana Kramer and Hunter Hayes. Strickland, known for his experience in artist development, helped Hayes and Kramer achieve Top 10 gold-certified debut singles.

== Personal life ==
He currently resides in Nashville, Tenn. with his wife and two children.
