= Bill Strickland (American football) =

American football player (1898–1976)

Profile
- Position: Guard

Personal information
- Born: September 14, 1898; Youngstown, Ohio, U.S.
- Died: January 31, 1976 (aged 77); Quincy, Illinois, U.S.
- Listed height: 5 ft 9 in (1.75 m)
- Listed weight: 220 lb (100 kg)

Career information
- High school: Macomb (Macomb, Illinois)
- College: Western Illinois, Lombard

Career history
- Milwaukee Badgers (1923)

Career statistics
- Games: 3
- Stats at Pro Football Reference

William Strickland (September 14, 1898 – January 31, 1976) was an American football player. A native of Youngstown, Ohio, he played college football at Western Illinois State Teachers College (now known as Western Illinois University) and Lombard College in Galesburg, Illinois. Strickland played professionally in the National Football League (NFL) as a guard for the Milwaukee Badgers. He appeared in three NFL games, one as a starter, during the 1923 season. In 1924, he was hired as an assistant football coach at Western Illinois. He also served as a coach for many years at Winchester High School in Winchester, Illinois. He then served briefly as the head basketball and baseball coach at Carthage College from 1948 to 1949. In 1949, he became athletic director at Mendon High School near Quincy, Illinois.
