= Bill Strickland (writer) =

American journalist

- Born: August 31, 1964 (age 62); Gary, Indiana
- Occupations: Journalist, nonfiction author, editor specializing in the sport of cycling

Bill Strickland (born August 31, 1964) is an American journalist, book author and editor whose work focuses primarily on the sport of cycling. He has twice served as Bicycling magazine's editor in chief, from 1999 to 2003 and currently starting in 2014. Strickland is an amateur road and cyclocross racer, and rides for the club Kapelmuur Independent.

== Works ==
The Quotable Cyclist, Strickland's first cycling-related book, was released in 1997 by Breakaway Books. It is a collation of more than 900 quotes about the sport taken from professional racers, journalists, literary authors, politicians, and cultural and public figures, with introductory essays by the author before each chapter. Outside magazine called it "a timely and charmingly evocative Bartlett's of the bicycle."

In 1998, he wrote Mountain Biking: The Ultimate Guide to the Ultimate Ride, an instructional book detailing the skills, fitness and gear needed for off-road cycling.

His most critically praised book, Ten Points, was published in 2007. A chronicle of how his cycling experiences during the 2004 amateur racing season helped him come to terms with an abusive childhood, it earned a starred review from Publishers Weekly, was deemed "uncomfortable but ultimately satisfying" by Kirkus Reviews, and was graded as an A− by Entertainment Weekly. Writing for Booklist, the reviewer David Pitt said: "The sports-as-spiritual-therapy theme has been explored plenty of times, and perhaps Strickland doesn't offer any blindingly new revelations, but his book is honest, and he doesn't waste our time with banal observations or facile psychologizing. He is also a very talented writer, and readers should brace themselves for some very moving — and also some rather unsettling — passages."

In 2008, Strickland co-wrote Johan Bruyneel's book We Might As Well Win, an account of Bruyneel's experiences as a professional cyclist and team director for, most notably, Lance Armstrong and Alberto Contador. Describing the book, cycling champion Eddy Merckx said, "In a sport where even the greatest riders and teams lose much more often than they win, Johan Bruyneel has carved out a remarkable record of victory as a team director—and his honest, behind-the-scenes stories show the way to success in cycling and in life itself."

Tour de Lance, published in 2010 in hardcover and in 2011 in paperback, depicts Lance Armstrong's return to professional cycling and subsequent attempt to win the Tour de France in 2009. The account was deemed "polarizing," in an Associated Press review, which explained that, "Fans believe he's capable of performing miracles on two wheels while detractors are certain he doped his way to seven consecutive victories in the world's toughest bike race. This book isn't likely to sway either side." Texas Monthly noted that "The 45-year-old Strickland tries to be objective; he describes the Armstrong he met in 1994 as "an ignorant, gutsy, mouthy, and unpredictable kid." But he also admits that he once owned an autographed Lance Armstrong lunchbox. Still, Strickland's breezy style and insider knowledge produce high drama, low humor (who knew Tour riders sometimes stop en masse for a communal "arrêt pipi"), and a mind-boggling primer on pro cycling's Machiavellian gamesmanship (though the book was printed too early to include a discussion of the doping accusations against Armstrong that surfaced last month)." In a starred review, Booklist termed the book, "An irresistible account of a story that needed telling." Daniel Coyle, author of Lance Armstrong's War, said, "Talent, willpower, and smarts to burn—the words apply equally well to Bill Strickland and his famous subject. Tour de Lance is sure to be the definitive inside account of one of the great sporting comebacks of all time."

== Awards ==
"The Escape," the December, 2011, edition of his monthly Bicycling magazine column The Pursuit, was named a Notable story by The Best American Sports Writing.
