= Bill Strickland =

American community leader, author and CEO (born 1947)

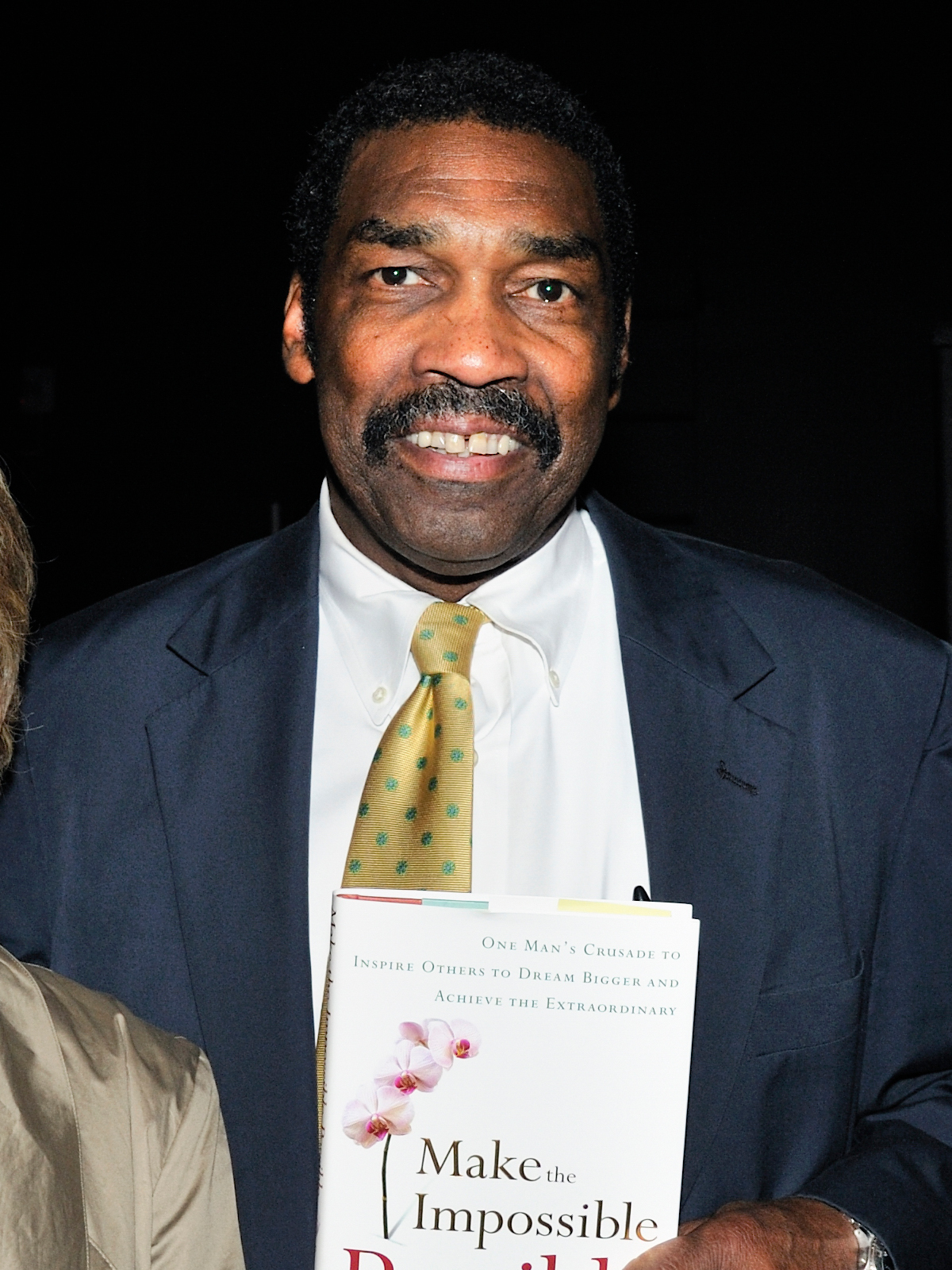
- Strickland in 2008
- Born: August 25, 1947 (age 79); Pittsburgh, Pennsylvania
- Education: University of Pittsburgh
- Occupations: Community leader and author
- Organization: Manchester Bidwell Corporation

William E. Strickland (born August 25, 1947, in Pittsburgh, Pennsylvania) is an American community leader, author, and the former president and CEO of the non-profit Manchester Bidwell Corporation based in Pittsburgh. The company's subsidiaries, the Manchester Craftsmen's Guild and Bidwell Training Center, work with disadvantaged and at-risk youth through involvement with the arts and provides job training for adults, respectively. Strickland is a winner of the MacArthur "Genius" Award (1996), Skoll Award (2007), and Goi Peace Award (2011).

== Life ==
Strickland grew up in the Manchester neighborhood of Pittsburgh, Pennsylvania, and graduated from Oliver High School. He then attended the University of Pittsburgh, where as an undergraduate he founded the Manchester Craftsmen's Guild as an after-school program to teach children pottery skill in his old neighborhood. He graduated cum laude with a bachelor's degree in American history and foreign relations in 1970. Following graduation he continued to build the Manchester Guild into an innovative nonprofit agency that uses the arts to inspire and mentor inner-city teenagers. In 1972 he took over the Bidwell Training Center that trains displaced adults for jobs.

He has served on the boards of the National Endowment for the Arts, Mellon Financial Corporation, and the University of Pittsburgh. For his work, Strickland has won various awards including a MacArthur Fellowship "genius" award in 1996. He has been honored by the White House, and received the Goi Peace Award in 2011.

In June 2018, Strickland announced that he would be stepping down from his role as president and CEO of Manchester Bidwell Corp., but that he would remain on as executive chairman. He had served as the leader of the organization for 50 years.

As of January 2025, Strickland has retired from Manchester Bidwell Corporation.

== Awards ==
- 1996: MacArthur Fellows Program
- 2000: Strong Men and Women
- 2007: Pittsburgher of the Year
- 2011: Goi Peace Award

== Further information ==
- Strickland, Bill (with Vince Rause) (2007). Make the Impossible Possible: One Man's Crusade to Inspire Others to Dream Bigger and Achieve the Extraordinary. New York: Currency Books of Random House. ISBN 978-0-385-52054-6.
- Martha I. Finney, In the Face of Uncertainty: 25 Top Leaders Speak Out on Challenge, Change, and the Future of American Business, AMACOM Div American Mgmt Assn, 2002, ISBN 978-0-8144-7161-6
