= Little Strickland =

Village and civil parish in Cumbria, England

Coordinates: 54.570°N 2.674°W

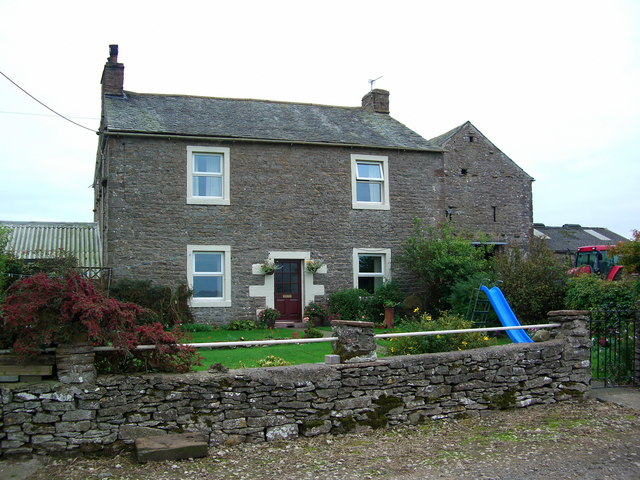
- Blands

- Location in Eden, Cumbria Location within Cumbria
- Population: 66 (2001)
- OS grid reference: NY5619
- Civil parish: Little Strickland
- Unitary authority: Westmorland and Furness
- Ceremonial county: Cumbria
- Region: North West
- Country: England
- Sovereign state: United Kingdom
- Post town: PENRITH
- Postcode district: CA10
- Dialling code: 01279
- Police: Cumbria
- Fire: Cumbria
- Ambulance: North West
- UK Parliament: Westmorland and Lonsdale

Little Strickland is a small village and civil parish in the Westmorland and Furness district of Cumbria, England. It is about 7 miles (11 km) from Penrith and 8 miles (13 km) from the small town of Appleby-in-Westmorland. The village has one place of worship and a telephone box. The population of the civil parish as taken at the 2011 Census was less than 100. Details are included in the parish of Great Strickland. On 1 April 2019 Thrimby parish was merged with Little Strickland.

== Transport ==
The village lies 0.5 miles (0.80 km) from the A6 road and the M6 motorway is also about 0.5 miles (0.80 km) away, but there is no motorway access point for about 4 miles (6.4 km).

== Nearby settlements ==
Nearby settlements include Penrith, Appleby-in-Westmorland, the villages of Great Strickland, Newby, Hackthorpe, Sleagill and Shap and the hamlets of Thrimby and Sweetholme.

== See also ==
- Listed buildings in Little Strickland
