= Grace Episcopal Church (Keswick, Virginia) =

Historic church in Virginia, United States

- Grace Church
- U.S. National Register of Historic Places
- Virginia Landmarks Register
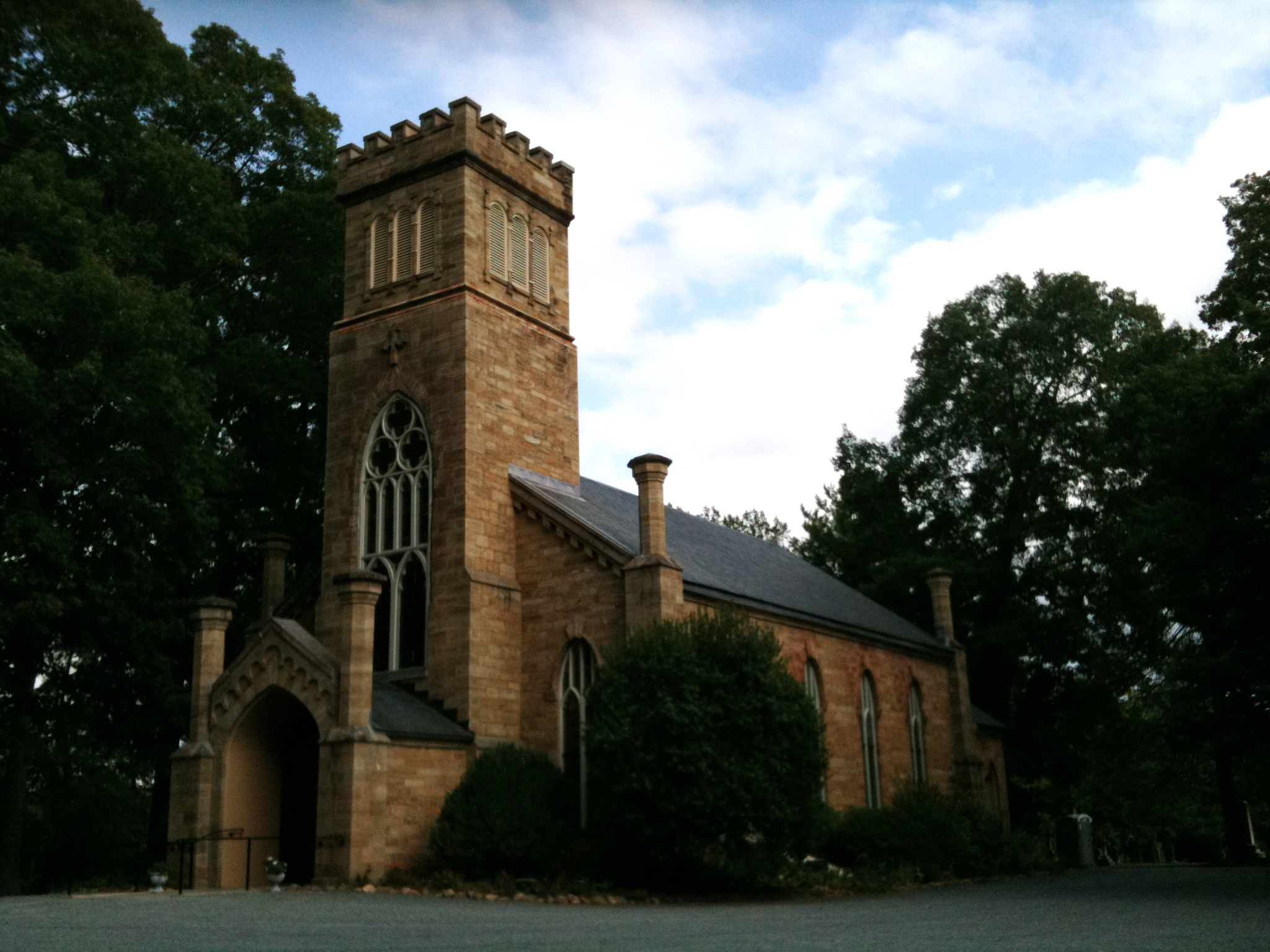
- Grace Church

- Location within Virginia Location within the United States
- Location: Northeast of Cismont on VA 231, Keswick, Virginia
- Coordinates: 38°3′39″N 78°18′31″W
- Area: 5 acres (2.0 ha)
- Built: 1847, 1895
- Architect: William Strickland
- Architectural style: Gothic Revival
- NRHP reference No.: 76002091
- VLR No.: 002-0043

Significant dates
- Added to NRHP: October 21, 1976
- Designated VLR: February 17, 1976

Grace Episcopal Church is a historic Episcopal church located at 5607 Gordonsville Road in Keswick, Albemarle County, Virginia, United States. The Gothic Revival building was designed by architect William Strickland in 1847. It is the only known work of Strickland in Virginia. The interior was rebuilt after a fire in 1895.

"Both the church and the hunt club have a long history in Keswick. The congregation dates back to 1745 as one of the first six churches in the Virginia colony back when the Church of England was the official state-sanctioned religion. The original church was replaced with a new building in 1855 but a fire two decades later left only the tower and walls standing. Those were incorporated into the current church when it was rebuilt at the site north of Cismont on Route 231. The church’s 1,575-pound bell was salvaged and is still in use. In fact, it will ring 10 times at 9:45 a.m. on Thanksgiving Day to announce the 10 a.m. prayer service, calling the congregation, hunters, steeds and dogs together."

It was added to the National Register of Historic Places on October 21, 1976.

== See also ==
- Episcopal Diocese of Virginia
- National Register of Historic Places listings in Albemarle County, Virginia
