= William Strickland Row =

Historic houses in Pennsylvania, United States

- U.S. National Register of Historic Places
- U.S. Historic district
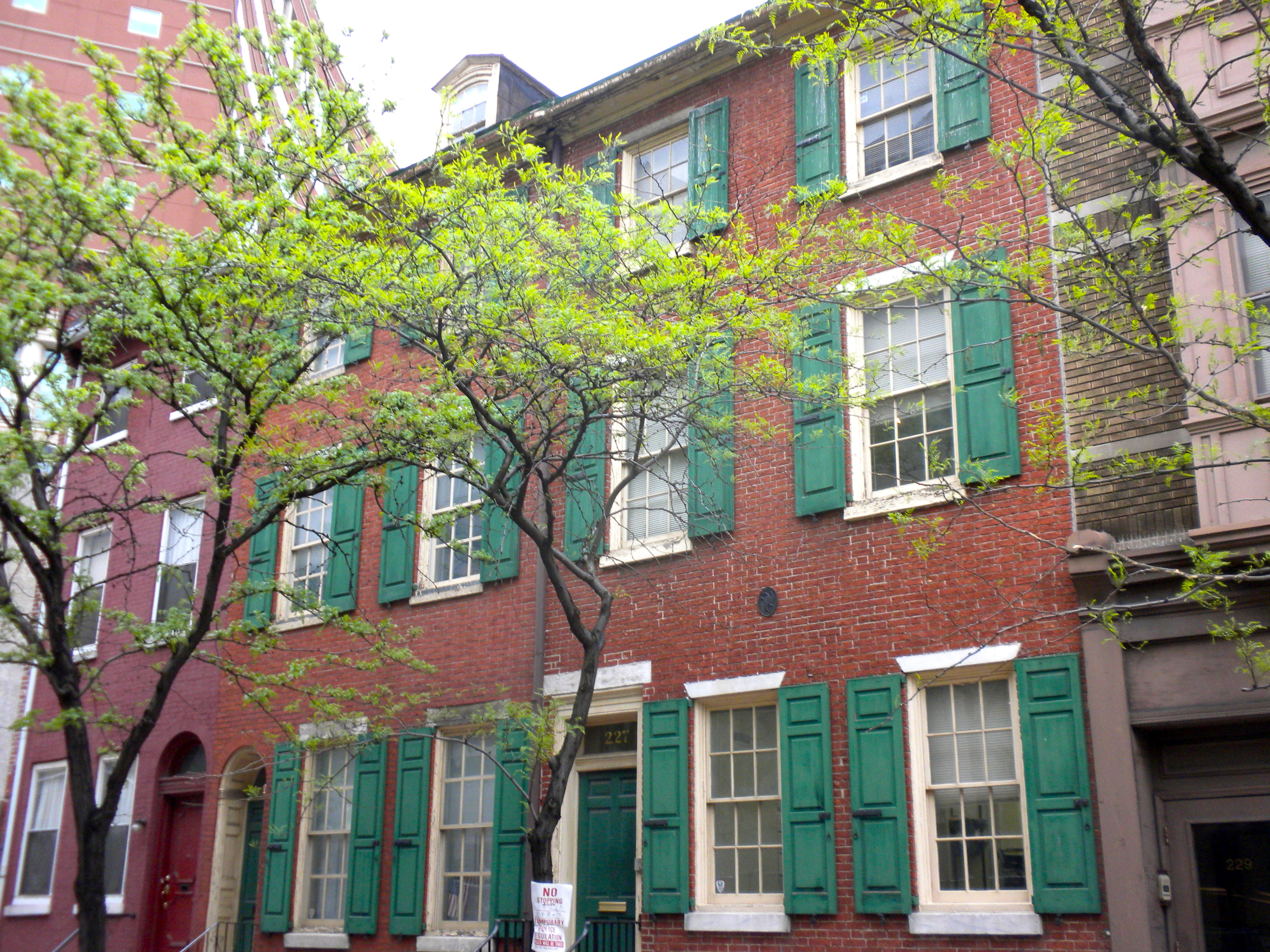
- 223 (far left), 225, and 227 (right) South 9th St.

- Location within Philadelphia Location within Pennsylvania Location within the United States
- Location: 215-227 S. 9th Street, Philadelphia, Pennsylvania
- Coordinates: 39°56′51″N 75°9′22″W
- Area: less than an acre
- Built: c. 1815
- Architect: Multiple
- Architectural style: Greek Revival
- NRHP reference No.: 77001192
- Added to NRHP: September 14, 1977

William Strickland Row was a set of seven historic rowhouses, four of which survive.

Designated as a national historic district, the remainder of homes in this series of rowhouses is located in the Washington Square West neighborhood of Philadelphia, Pennsylvania, United States.

== History and architectural features ==
These brick rowhouses were built circa 1815, and each measure between sixteen feet, six inches, and twenty feet wide and thirty-five feet deep. They were designed with Greek Revival-style design details and built using the typical Philadelphia rowhouse plan of the period with front building, piazza, and back building.

Noted Philadelphia architect William Strickland (1788–1854) resided at 219 South 9th Street from 1823 to 1829.

This series of rowhouses, which was designated as a national historic district in 1977, is located in the Washington Square West neighborhood of Philadelphia, Pennsylvania.

== Gallery ==
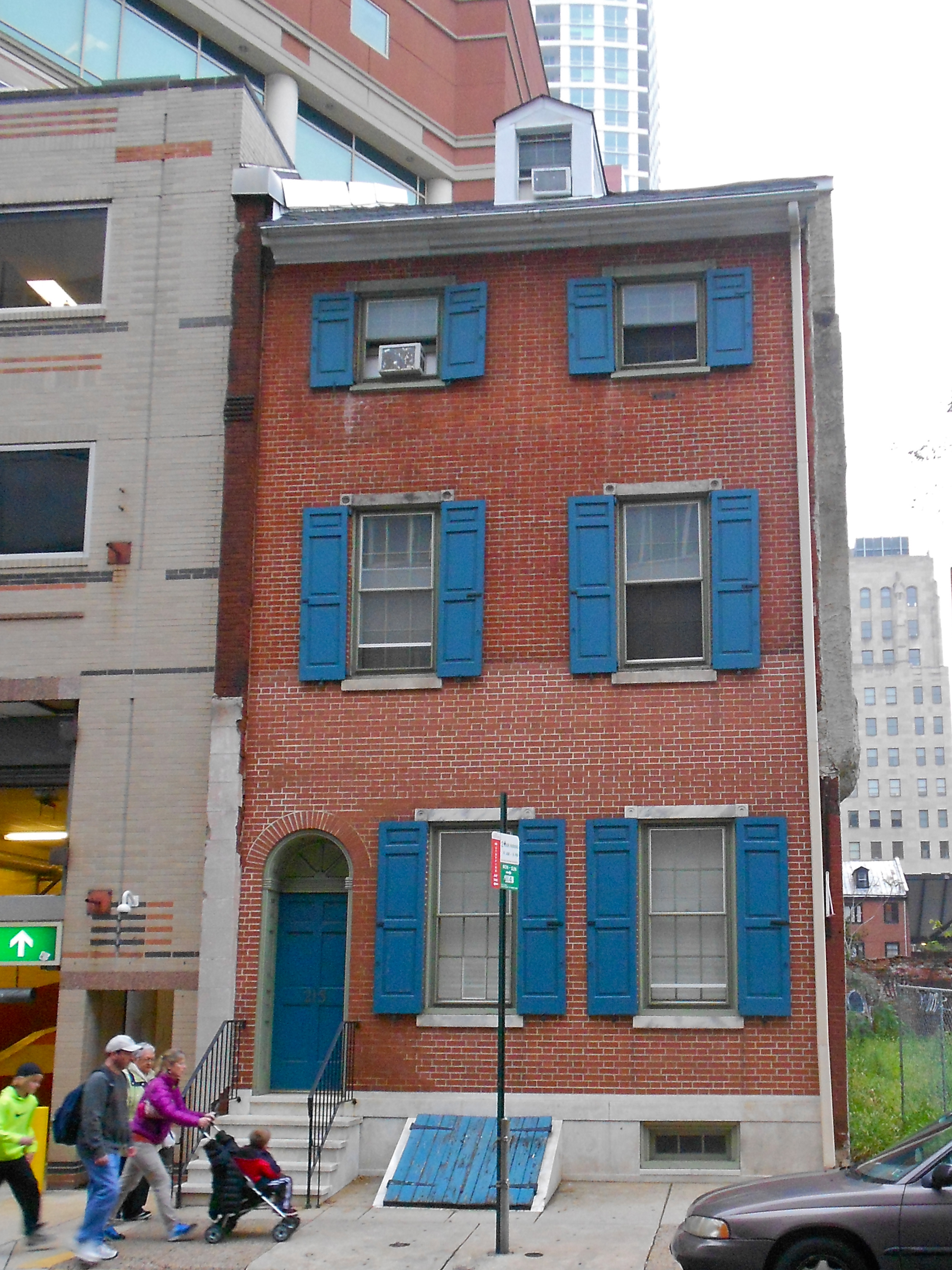
215 South 9th

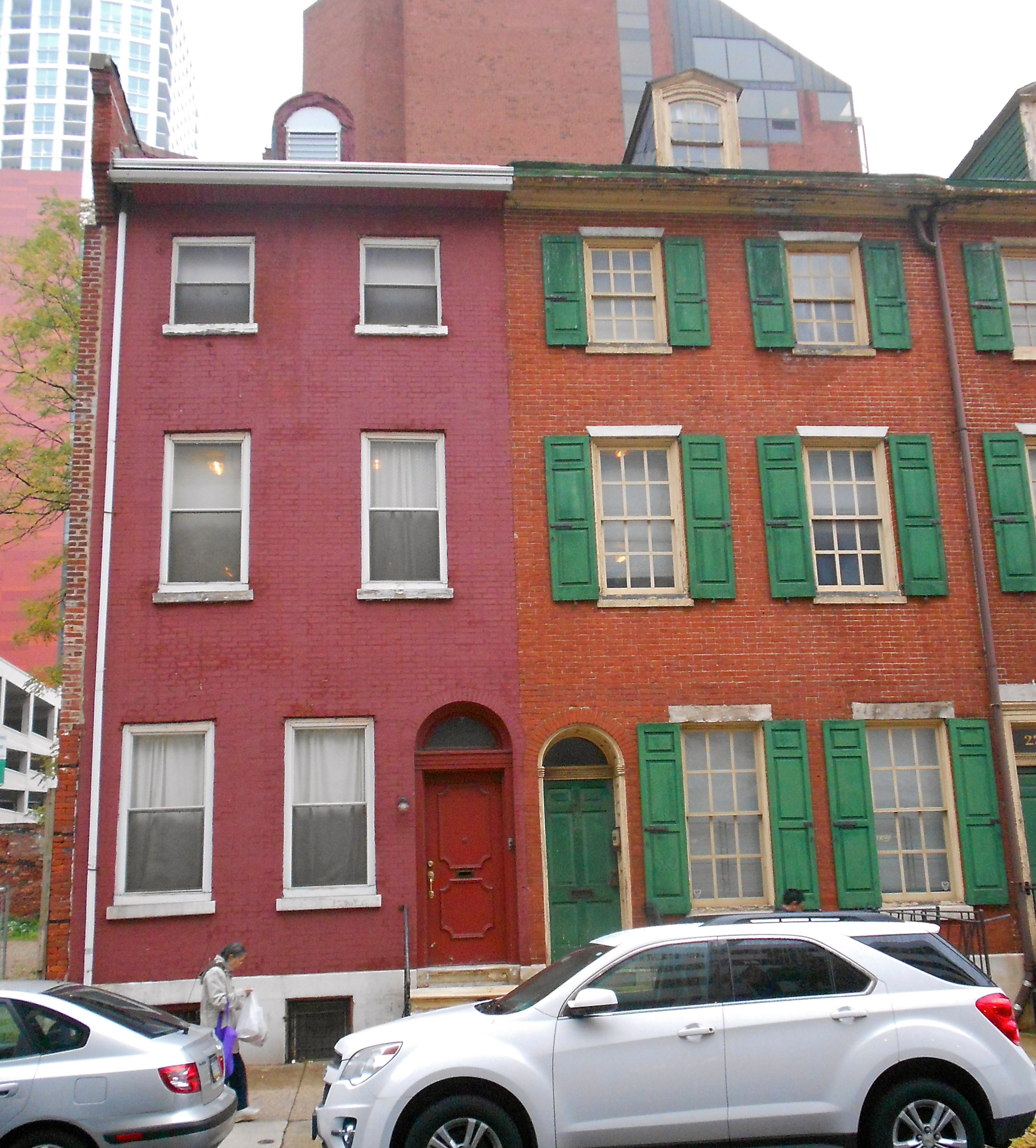
223 and 225 South 9th
