= Merchants' Exchange Building (Philadelphia) =

- U.S. National Register of Historic Places
- U.S. National Historic Landmark
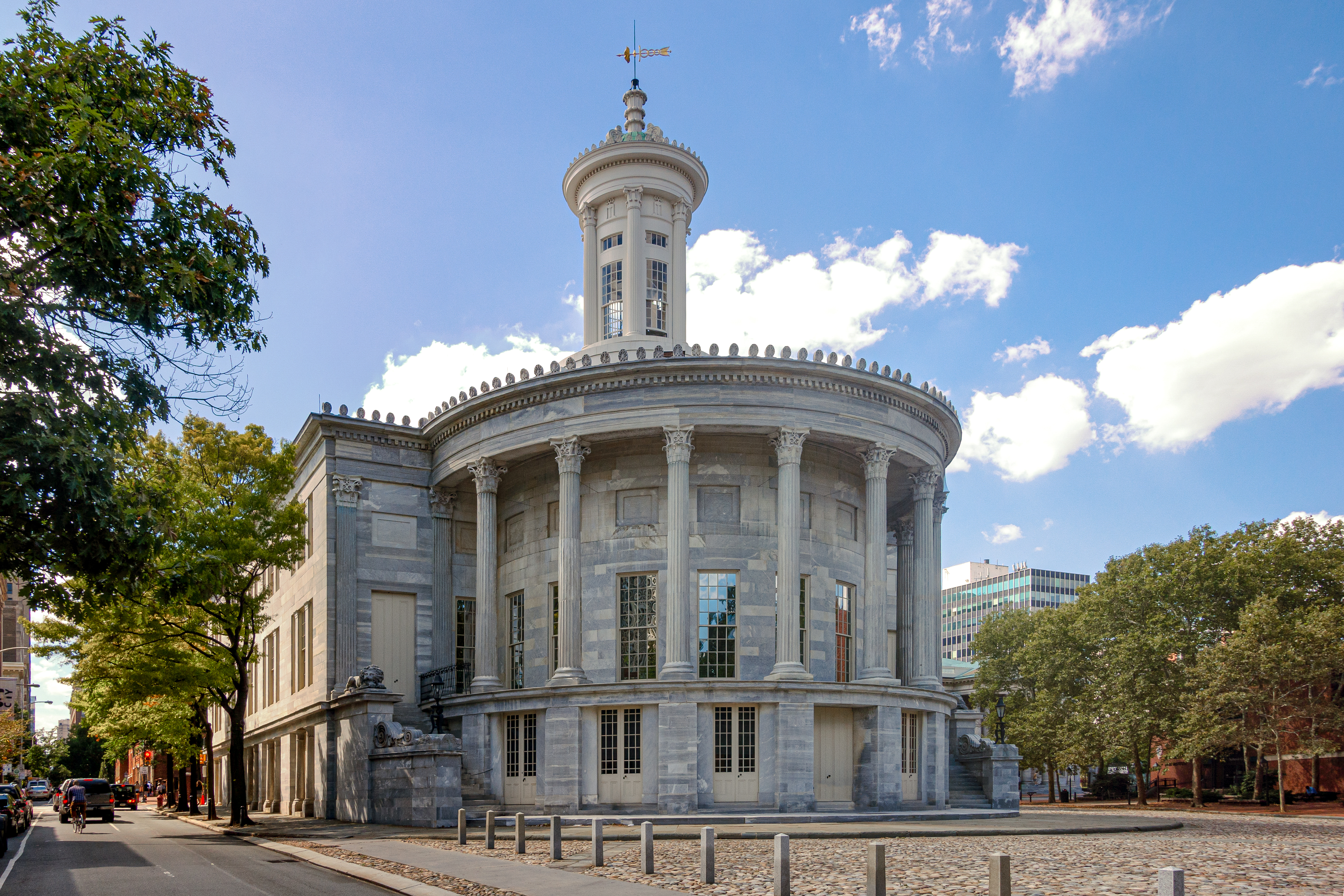

- Location within Philadelphia Location within Pennsylvania Location within the United States
- Location: 143 S. Third Street; Philadelphia, Pennsylvania
- Coordinates: 39.9473°N 75.1460°W
- Architect: William Strickland
- Architectural style: Greek Revival
- NRHP reference No.: 01001047

Significant dates
- Added to NRHP: August 7, 2001
- Designated NHL: August 7, 2001

The Merchants' Exchange Building (also known as the Philadelphia Exchange ) is a historic building which is located on the triangular site bounded by Dock, 3rd and Walnut Streets in the Old City neighborhood of Philadelphia, Pennsylvania. It was designed by architect William Strickland, in the Greek Revival style, the first national American architectural style and was built between 1832 and 1834. It operated as a brokerage house in the nineteenth century, but by 1875 the Philadelphia Stock Exchange had taken the place of the Merchants' Exchange.

The building was declared a National Historic Landmark in 2001.

It is the oldest existing stock exchange building in the United States, but is now used as the headquarters of the Independence National Historical Park.

== Origin ==
The City Tavern, which had been the center of the Philadelphia business community since it was built in 1773, became increasingly crowded because of the unsuitability of its floor plan to accommodate its growing clientele. At this time, Philadelphia epitomized America's ideal city by maintaining strong economic, political, and architectural advancements. The middle class was strengthening and citizens were becoming more inclined to start their own businesses, so commerce and trade continued to thrive. The economic boom of the Jacksonian era reinforced the idea among merchants that there was a need for a centralized exchange building.

In 1831, a group of prominent Philadelphians led by Stephen Girard, the nation's wealthiest man at the time, constructed a building for trade, commerce, and post to preside. Thus, they founded the Philadelphia Exchange Company and appointed an architect to begin the introductory stages of creating what later became the Merchants' Exchange Building.

== Architecture ==
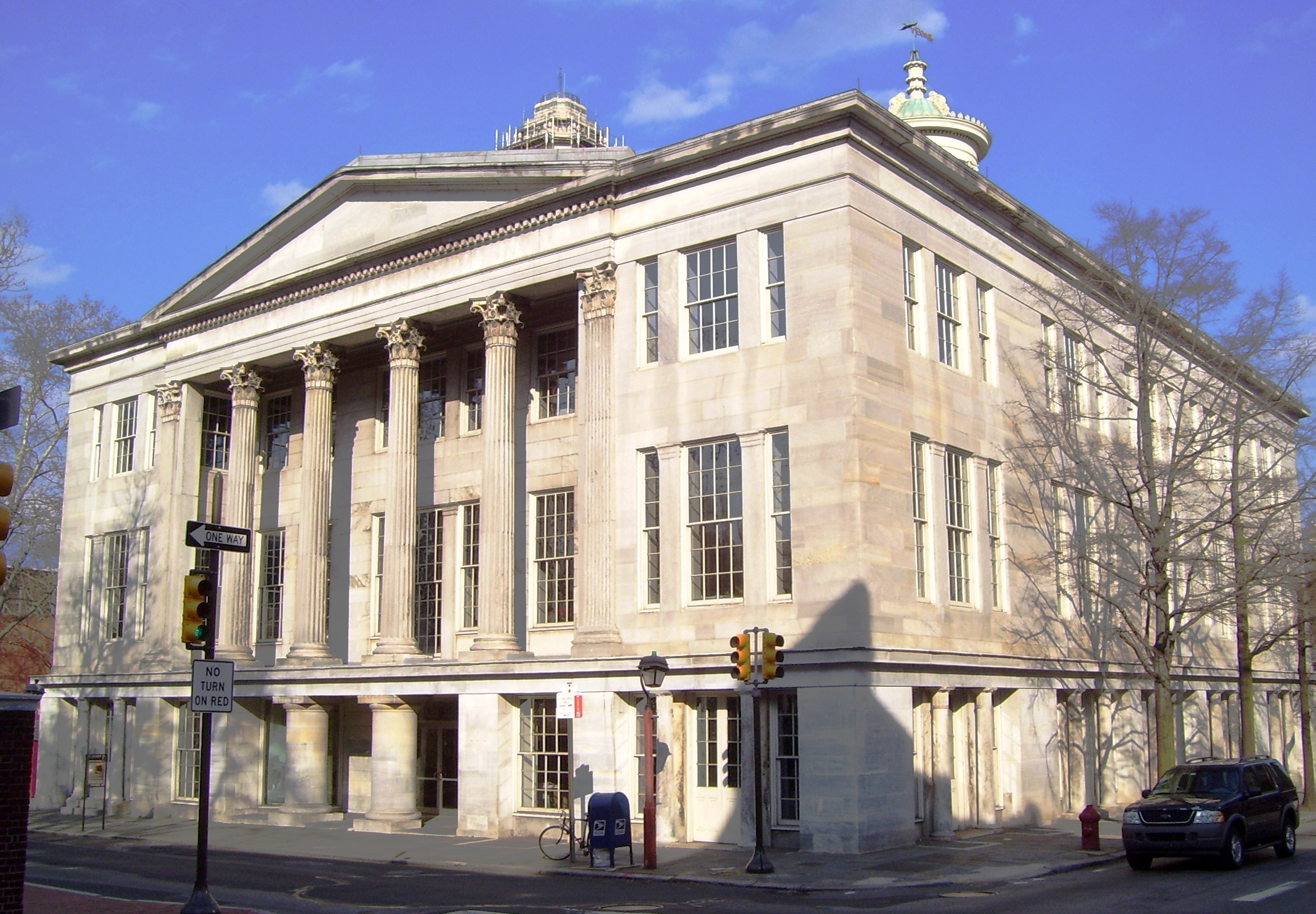
The front of the building (2012)

The Greek Revival movement became particularly attractive for American architects in the late eighteenth century on account of the rising popularity of ancient Greece's democratic principles and the strong desire to recast the nation's image and further distance it from Great Britain. Greek Revival architecture began to gain favor in the United States when Thomas Jefferson appointed Benjamin Henry Latrobe to design a number of prominent buildings in Washington, D.C., and Philadelphia for the Federal government. Latrobe led the country's movement toward the Greek Revival style through the late eighteenth century and developed it for future American architects.

Among several mentees of Latrobe was William Strickland, the man who was ultimately appointed architect of the Merchants' Exchange Building. Strickland's design is admired to this day for its balance of order and ornamentation, one of the ideals of the Greek Revival style.

While the trustees of the Philadelphia Exchange Company chose Strickland for his increasing local popularity, his design of the Merchants' Exchange Building is remembered today not only for its reflection of the Greek Revival style, but also the uniqueness in its design. The plot of land allotted for the building was one of the few triangle plots that were not a part of William Penn's original grid layout of Philadelphia.

Strickland's use of a semicircular facade at the rear of the building is an example of his ingenuity in adapting the design so that the building could naturally flow with the arch of the curved road that borders the property. Although both sides of the building have distinctively different facades, Strickland evoked the Greek Revival style through his use of marble Corinthian pillars and elaborate ornamentation. Strickland's use of the Choragic Monument of Lysicrates as inspiration for the building's lantern tower drew the local press to write in a newspaper in 1831 that "Philadelphia is truly the Athens of America."

Strickland later went on to be the architect of the Second Bank of the United States and the steeple on the Independence Hall Tower, though the Merchants' Exchange Building is still widely recognized as his greatest masterpiece because of its unique asymmetrical shape.

== See also ==
- Independence National Historical Park
- William Strickland
- Greek Revival architecture
- List of stock exchanges in the Americas
- List of National Historic Landmarks in Philadelphia
- National Register of Historic Places listings in Center City, Philadelphia
