= St. John's Church, Philadelphia =

Historic church in Pennsylvania, United States

- St. John's Church, Northern Liberties
- U.S. National Register of Historic Places
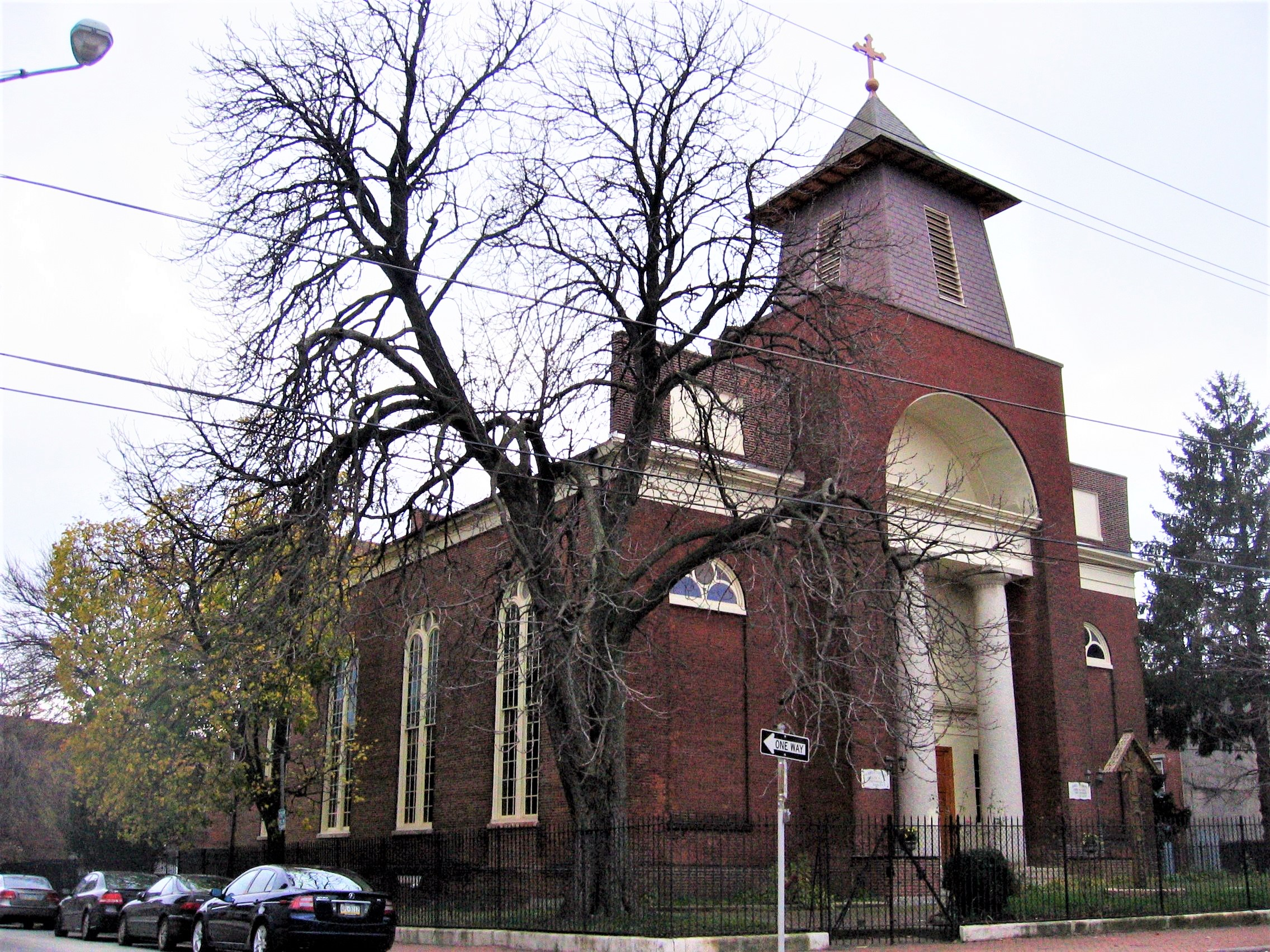

- Location within Philadelphia Location within Pennsylvania Location within the United States
- Location: 220--230 Brown St., Philadelphia, Pennsylvania, U.S>
- Coordinates: 39°57′46″N 75°8′33″W
- Area: 0.5 acres (0.20 ha)
- Built: 1815
- Architect: Strickland, William
- Architectural style: Colonial Revival, Classical Revival
- NRHP reference No.: 83002278
- Added to NRHP: February 24, 1983

St. John's Church, Northern Liberties was the original name of the historic church at 220–230 Brown Street in Philadelphia, Pennsylvania. It was built, in the Colonial Revival style, in 1815 and is one of architect William Strickland's oldest surviving designs. The same year he also designed the Second Bank of the United States. The church is the seventh oldest surviving church in the state of Pennsylvania, not counting earlier Quaker meetinghouses.

In 1931 the church was consecrated as the Holy Trinity Romanian Orthodox Church and was sold by the Episcopalian parish to the Romanian community in 1972. Sometime before 1931, a wooden steeple was built above the entrance. In 1983 the church was added to the National Register.

Since 1999 a series of restoration projects have been undertaken and completed, some quite extensive; as of 2020 restoration work was ongoing.
