= Mechanics National Bank (Philadelphia) =

Former bank in Philadelphia, Pennsylvania

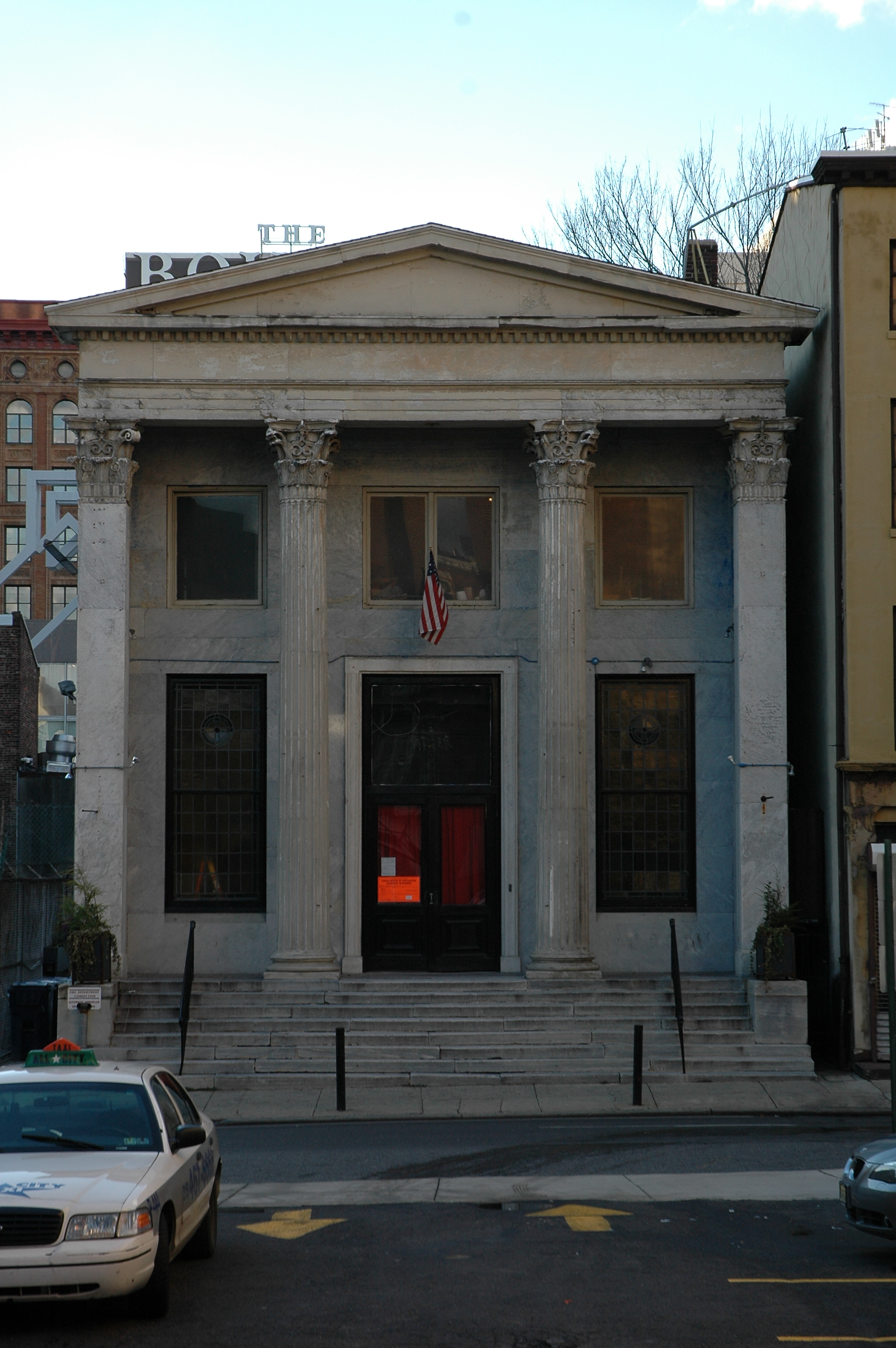
National Mechanics Building in Philadelphia in January 2007

The Mechanics National Bank was a Philadelphia, Pennsylvania, bank founded by and geared toward mechanics. The building was built in 1836 by architect William Strickland. Now part of the Old City neighborhood of Philadelphia, the historic building is occupied by National Mechanics, a bar and restaurant.

== History ==
In 1809, Philadelphia was already known for both skilled workers and as America's main financial center, but the merchants who controlled its banks had little interest in lending to mechanics or manufacturers. So a small group of artisans and master craftsmen resolved to organize one that would be run by and for the mechanics themselves. The following January, they adopted a set of bylaws that required all directors to be mechanics currently working at their trades and prohibited mercantile investments like ships.

The bank would also be one of the first to acquire its capital from a large number of small shareholders instead of a few large investors. While the organizers bought some stock themselves, they reserved most of the 14,000 shares for a public sale at Independence Hall the next month. There wasn't enough room in the building for everyone who wanted to buy stock – according to one report, a man lost his hat and wig trying to climb in a window – and nearly 700 people were turned away. Within an hour, they had adjourned to a nearby coffeehouse and organized the Commercial Bank. By the end of the day, five more banks had been organized in the city. The pundits were skeptical. An editorial entitled "Infatuation" appeared in several newspapers:

This nation is certainly verging to a crisis, which no wisdom, no counsel, appears adequate to check or stem… the ruin and bankruptcy and depreciation of credit, as well as morals, that have been exhibited by the multiplication, beyond all measure, of banking institutions; within a week a new bank called the Mechanics' Bank… the run for signatures of its stock was so great that six or seven hundred persons could not obtain access to the place of subscription...We may expect to see the whole property of this flourishing state, and all its useful industry and frugal habits, about to be sunk into the den of sordid speculation.

— Aurora, Philadelphia; Wednesday, February 7, 1810.

Within weeks, the legislature had banned unchartered associations from most banking activities and the new bank temporary closed, lent most of its capital back to the shareholders, and began lobbying for a charter, which was finally granted in 1814.

For its first twenty years, the "Banking House" was a three-story brick building formerly occupied by a hat and bonnet maker (the vault was an addition in the back yard) and by 1833, it had become completely inadequate for its purpose. After a burglar took $3,995 in gold and silver one night, an inspection found the building "in a decayed state and in many parts quite insecure." Despite some hasty repairs, the bank outgrew the building within two years, temporarily expanded into the house next door and began to buy land on the opposite side of Third Street. Unfortunately, it was only able to obtain two adjacent lots, resulting in a narrow site flanked by higher buildings on both sides.

=== William Strickland's building ===
The name Philadelphia Mechanic has become synonymous with skill and superiority in workmanship.

— Edwin Troxell Freedley, Philadelphia and Its Manufactures, 1859

In the summer of 1836, the directors authorized "the erection of a Banking House...to be completed in a substantial manner of the best material, for $19,930." Their choice as architect and contractor was William Strickland, one of the most prominent in Philadelphia and a pioneer of the Greek Revival style who had already designed the Second Bank of the United States on Chestnut Street and was working on new buildings for the Bank of Philadelphia and Merchants' Exchange. In addition, he had personal ties to the bank, whose directors included several contractors he had worked with, as well as colleagues from the Franklin Institute and his wife's cousin.

Because of the narrow lot at 22 S. 3rd St, the Mechanics' Bank is one of Strickland's smallest buildings, but the challenge seems to have inspired him. The heavier square pilasters that support the corners of the portico instead of round columns and the especially fine stone carving (by his longtime partner John Struthers) help to keep the building from being overwhelmed by its bulkier neighbors. Because the side walls faced very narrow alleys, most of the building was a single high room in which a large skylight lit both the main banking room with its U-shaped mahogany counter and the president and cashier's offices, which were separated from the main room by lower partitions of wood paneling. The vault and second-story directors’ room occupied a narrower wing at the back.

In November 1837, the building committee reported that "the Banking House of the Mechanics' Bank is not inferior to any in the city either in its appearance, exterior or interior, nor in respect to its perfect adaptation to the use for which it has been erected." Unfortunately, their satisfaction with Strickland's architecture didn't extend to his business practices: he had sent them a bill for $3,920 in additional expenses resulting from changes to the corners of the portico and the arrangement of the vault and offices. They claimed not to have authorized most of them and refused to pay the additional money, perhaps in part because the charter limited expenditures on land and buildings for the banking house to $50,000.

=== Final years ===
The aids to be derived from the existing Banks cannot but be too limited and too casual to answer fully all the good purposes to which, under special modifications, such Establishments may be made conducive. Conducted as they generally are by men, tho' liberal and enlightened, yet of commercial rather than mechanical pursuits, their information cannot but be imperfect as to the character and credit of persons engaged in occupations entirely different from their own.

— Memorial of the Directors of the Mechanics’ Bank of the City and County of Philadelphia to the Pennsylvania State Legislature. January 14, 1812

By the time the bank moved into Strickland's building, the bank's character had already begun to change. The original organizers had been among the city's most successful craftsmen (most employed many apprentices and journeymen and several had sidelines as merchants as well as their trades), but most still had started as apprentices and worked alongside their employees, but starting with the 1814 charter, directors no longer had to be active mechanics, and a few merchants, "gentlemen," and professional bankers began to join the board. As manufacturing in the Industrial Revolution replaced handicraft, factory owners and managers replaced the remaining artisans and master craftsmen. The bank continued to specialize in funding the manufacturing industries and Philadelphia mechanics, continued to lead the world in building and maintaining the equipment that it required, but by the time it became part of the new federal banking system as Mechanics National Bank, it answered to mechanics’ employers, not the mechanics themselves.

The surviving records of Mechanics National Bank end in 1900. Two years later, it bought back most of its stock, and on February 16, 1903, the fifteen remaining shareholders voted to dissolve the corporation and transfer its business to Girard National Bank. Subsequent owners rented the building to various other banks until the depression; then sold it to the Norwegian Seaman's Mission, which remodeled it as a chapel and social service center for sailors until 1982 when the dwindling congregation moved to Old Swedes’ Church in South Philadelphia and sold the building at auction. After twenty-five years as the legendary Club Revival and several other bars including an ill-fated Coyote Ugly and Foggy Goggles, the building has seen a rebirth. The current tenants have chosen the historically pertinent name, National Mechanics, to make an upscale bar and restaurant where the décor and demeanor tip their respective hats to the building's original incarnation.

The front of the structure remains as Strickland built it, but the rear and interior have been greatly altered. In 1898, the architect James Windrim renovated it for the bank, replacing Strickland's vault and directors room (as well as a small office added later) with a much larger two story structure of fireproof brick and iron construction, while the church divided the main room into two stories and added additional office space at the rear in 1930 and later tenants made further changes.

== Notable directors and customers ==
John Aitken (subscriber), Music publisher and composer

Most of the founders of the Mechanics' Bank were artisans who had served traditional apprenticeships but whose later paths set them apart from their peers. John Aitken was a silversmith in his native Scotland, but when he moved to Philadelphia in 1785, he became one of North America's first music publishers. While his competitors printed sheet music using hand-engraved metal plates, Aitken introduced the use of standardized punches to stamp notes onto the plates, a faster process which also produced more legible scores.

In 1807, Aitken opened a music store at 76 North Second Street in an odd-looking building known as "Jones’s Folly." In addition to his publishing business, he dabbled in composition (with little success) and rented the second floor to an Englishman by the name of Blake, who gave flute and "clarionet" lessons until he was visited by a group of Quaker elders and told to "stop teaching the clarionet to our boys or we will have thee put in prison."

Rudolph “Old Dutch Cleanser” Blankenburg (director), Mayor of Philadelphia

In 1911, Rudolph Blankenburg became Philadelphia's 164th mayor. A German-born dry-goods manufacturer and merchant, he had been active in local affairs since 1880 and was affectionately known as "Old Dutch Cleanser" because of his origins and zealous dedication to reform. During his four years in office, he tried to replace the political cronies appointed by predecessors like John Reyburn with trained professionals, instituted a modern civil service system with on-the-job training and standardized employee benefits, and systematized city contracts. His wife, Lucretia Longshore Blankenburg, was a prominent women's suffragist and an important reform activist in her own right.

George H. Boker (director), Playwright and poet

While almost forgotten today, George Henry Boker was a well-known poet, playwright, and diplomat in the mid-19th century. He was originally trained as a lawyer but after traveling in Europe, he was inspired to become a writer instead. He published a few books of unremarkable lyric poetry in the 1840s and then turned to drama, becoming one of the most successful American playwrights by the mid-1850s. He specialized in blank verse romantic tragedies, usually in historical European settings; his best known was the 1855 Francesca da Rimini. In the 1860s, he returned to writing lyric poetry, especially sonnets.

During the Civil War, Boker helped organize (and later became president of) the Union League to support the war effort and published Poems of the War, a collection of lyric poetry In recognition of his services, President Ulysses S. Grant appointed him Minister (Ambassador) to the Ottoman Empire in 1871 and, four years later, to Russia.

His father, Charles S. Boker, was also a director of the Mechanics' bank, and later was president of the much larger Girard Bank during the 1857-8 financial crisis. George Boker's The Book of the Dead was a response to his father's posthumous critics.

Edward H. Coates (director), Pennsylvania Academy of Fine Arts

Mechanics' Bank director Edward H. Coates was a businessman and art patron most notorious for his association with Thomas Eakins, perhaps the greatest American realist painter. As chairman of the Pennsylvania Academy of Fine Arts’ Committee on Instruction, Coates was instrumental in appointing Eakins as director and supported reforms like teaching anatomy from nude models instead of plaster casts. In 1883, the two served together on a University of Pennsylvania's committee to oversee the photographer Eadweard Muybridge's pioneering studies of human and animal movement. However, he soon grew uncomfortable with many of his practices, especially his use of students as models. In 1885, he commissioned "The Swimming Hole," but rejected the finished painting for its explicit and erotic depiction of male students and friends. The following year, he fired Eakins for removing a drapery from a male model in front of female students, though he continued to buy his paintings.

His brother, George M. Coates, was also a director of the bank.

Abner Davis (director), Nail factor and jailer

Nail manufacturer Abner Davis's life shows how Philadelphia's economy shifted from handicraft to industry in the early days of the 19th century. Colonial blacksmiths forged nails one at a time, but by the 1790s, machines had been developed that could cut many nails from one long iron bar and, later, shape the heads as well. Davis was one of the first to adopt this new technology: in addition to running his own shop, he was in 1795 appointed as an assistant keeper at the Walnut Street Prison to "help direct the work… of the Men in the Yard, Smith Shop, & Nail Factory," which he had set up.

William Flintham (director), Cooper and would-be merchant

The bank drew its early directors from among Philadelphia's most successful tradesmen. Most of these employed many apprentices and journeymen and some moved on to become manufacturers or merchants – with varying success. In 1807, William Flintham invested profitably in shipping some flaxseed to Ireland. A generation later, the antiquarian Abraham Ritter recalled that "Mr Flintham was a very active and intelligent man, whose mechanical trade could not confine his genius; and passing from the cooper-shop to the counting-house, entered more extensively in the shipping business, but alas, in fine, not to profit."

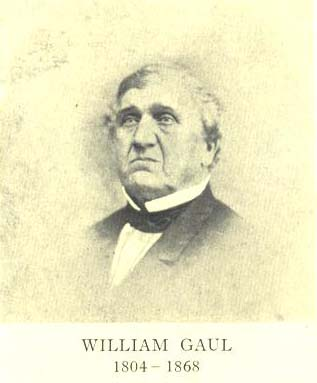
William Gaul

William Gaul (director), Malt manufacturer and brewer

Director William Gaul was part of a large family of brewers in Philadelphia. His father, Frederick Gaul, had come to the city from Frankfurt-am-Main, Germany in 1804 and owned the former Robert Hare brewery which had made George Washington's favorite porter. William Gaul was a successful malt manufacturer and dealer as well as brewer and built one of the first mansions on North Broad Street. It later became the home of the actor Edwin Forrest and, after his death, a home for retired actors and now forms part of the Freedom Theater complex. His descendants remain in the brewing business to this day – one of his daughters married a Yuengling.

Joseph Gillingham (director), Merchant and engineer

Although Joseph Gillingham was a merchant, not a mechanic, he shared the other early directors’ interest in manufacturing and technology. With Josiah White, he built a water-powered nail factory at the Falls of Schuylkill (now East Falls). In 1817, they offered to build a water-powered pumping station to fill the reservoir at Fairmount (now the site of the Philadelphia Museum of Art), but the water department decided to continue to use steam pumps. Three years later, the city changed its mind, bought them out, and constructed a station on their plan just below the reservoir.

Uriah Hunt (director), Publisher A generation after his death, Publishers’ Weekly still fondly remembered "Uriah Hunt, the tall, serene, and in every way worthy and admirable Quaker publisher of county and other school books and useful works." One of Hunt's best-selling authors was Parson Mason Weems, the fanciful biographer who invented the story of George Washington chopping down his father's cherry tree.

Jacob Johnson and William Woodward (directors), Publishers

Both Johnson and Woodward published religious books, primarily for western, rural markets, and pioneered new methods of wholesale and "mail-order" distribution. Johnson and his partner Benjamin Warner both traveled extensively and built personal relationships with small town merchants and booksellers, while Woodward relied on his reputation for personal piety to gain the trust of local ministers who handled his distribution for him.

Philip Justice (director), Manufacturer and war profiteer

Philip Justice owned a factory for cast steel springs and other railroad parts and equipment in North Philadelphia. He was the first American to import steel tires for railroad cars, which he sold to Philadelphia's Baldwin Locomotive works. During the Civil War, he invented "an improved mode of attaching Armor Plates to Vessels" and he turned over much of his plant to military production, but he seems to have been far more interested in profit than patriotism: an investigation and court case found that, in the words of the US Supreme Court, "the arms were unserviceable and unsafe for troops to handle."

Stephen North (director), Pharmacist

Stephen North was a pharmacist and early director of the bank. In 1821, the University of Pennsylvania announced that its medical school would establish a pharmacy program, a move that local pharmacists saw as an attempt by physicians to take over their profession. In response, North chaired a meeting where they started their own College of Apothecaries and Penn shelved its plans. This institution later became the Philadelphia College of Pharmacy and is now the University of the Sciences.

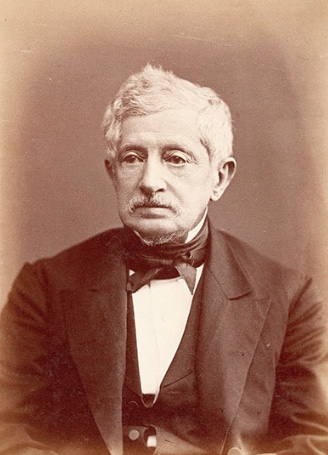
George D. Rosengarten

George D. Rosengarten (Director), Accountant, Pennsylvania Railroad Director and Quinine Distributor

In 1821, the 20-year-old George D. Rosengarten was called in to mediate a dispute between two business partners, Seitler, a Frenchman who spoke only French and Zeitler, a German who spoke only German. Rosengarten, a German immigrant who was fluent in both (as well as English), was so helpful that they took him on as a partner and within two years he had become the sole owner of the company. The business began to prosper after he took on another partner, N.F.H. Denis, a French chemist who was an expert in processing the malaria drug quinine, which financed the company's expansion. Its products won numerous awards from the Franklin Institute and by 1862 it was selling more than 350 different chemicals and was the main provider of quinine to the Union Army.

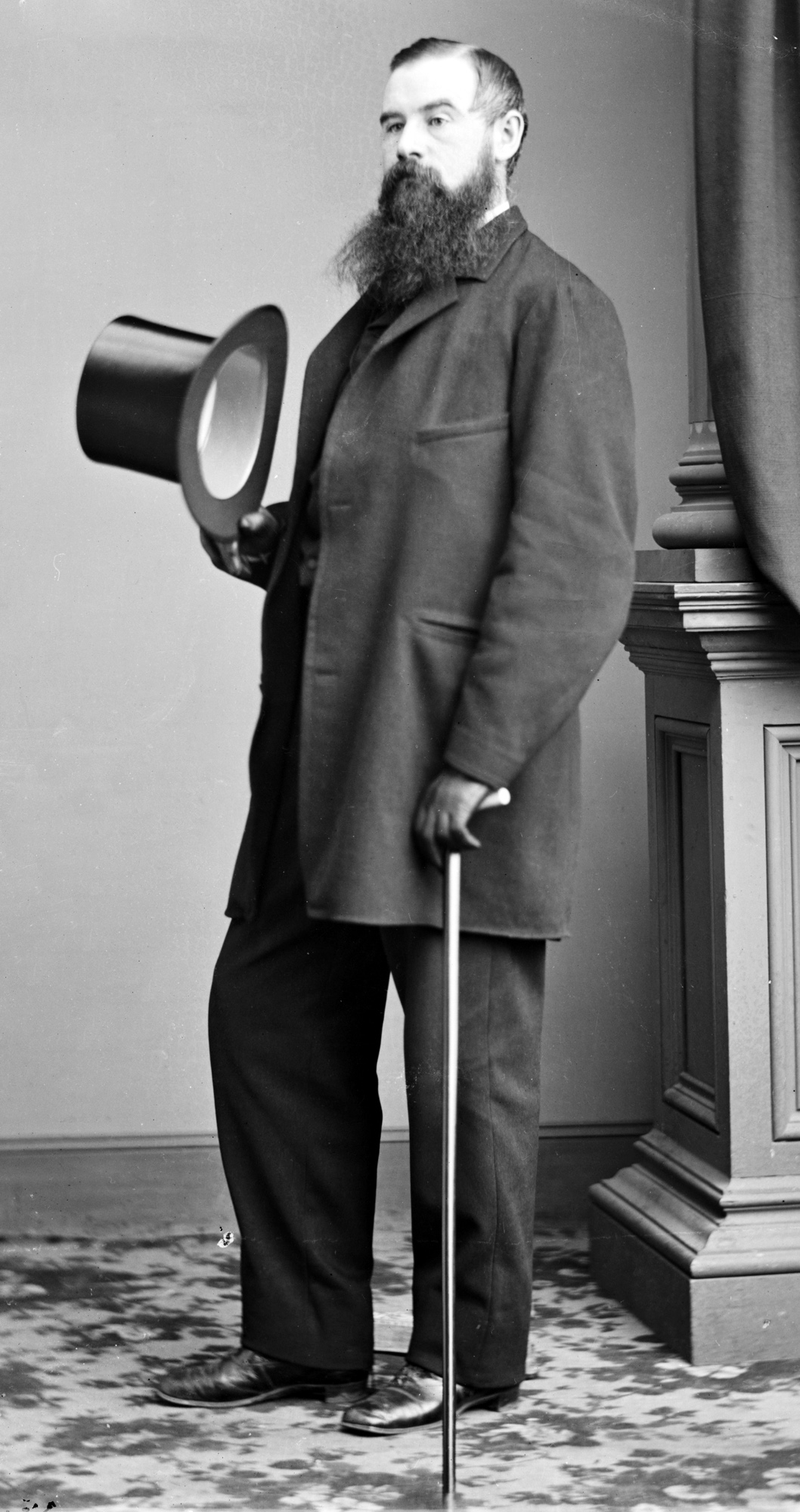
Charles G. Leland

Frederick Lennig (director), Chemical Manufacturer

Another German, Nicholas Lennig established the Tacony Chemical Works in 1831 but died soon after. His son, Charles, and nephew Frederick Lennig (a Mechanics' Bank director) inherited the factory. At the Centennial Exposition in 1876, they were awarded a medal "for the products exhibited coming from the distillation of wood, for metallic salts and especially for the careful manufacture of sulphate of alumina and alum".

Charles Godfrey Leland (customer, son of director), Poet, folklorist, and educator

Charles G. Leland was a poet, folklorist, antiquarian, libertarian and educator. Born in Philadelphia, he matriculated from what is now Princeton University in 1845 and traveled extensively in Europe and the America's studying Romany, witch and Native American cultures. His first literary acclaim was for the comedies, The Hans Breitmann Ballads, and was followed by his more serious folklore studies. Throughout his career he produced more than 50 books including The English Gypsies (1873), Algonquin Legends (1884) and Aradia, or the Gospel of the Witches (1899). He died in Florence, Italy in 1903 and his ashes were interred in Philadelphia's Laurel Hill Cemetery. His works are still read today by Wicca's and others interested in folk history for their fine lyrical content and first-hand sources of antiquated incantations and spells.

Ebenezer Maxwell (director), Eminent Victorian

Ebenezer Maxwell was a cloth merchant. In 1859, he built a mansion on Walnut Lane in Germantown, not far from the home of his friend and fellow director Joseph G. Mitchell. The building is now a museum of Victorian architecture and design.
