= Women in the Victorian era =

Victorian
- 1837–1901
Regency era	Edwardian era
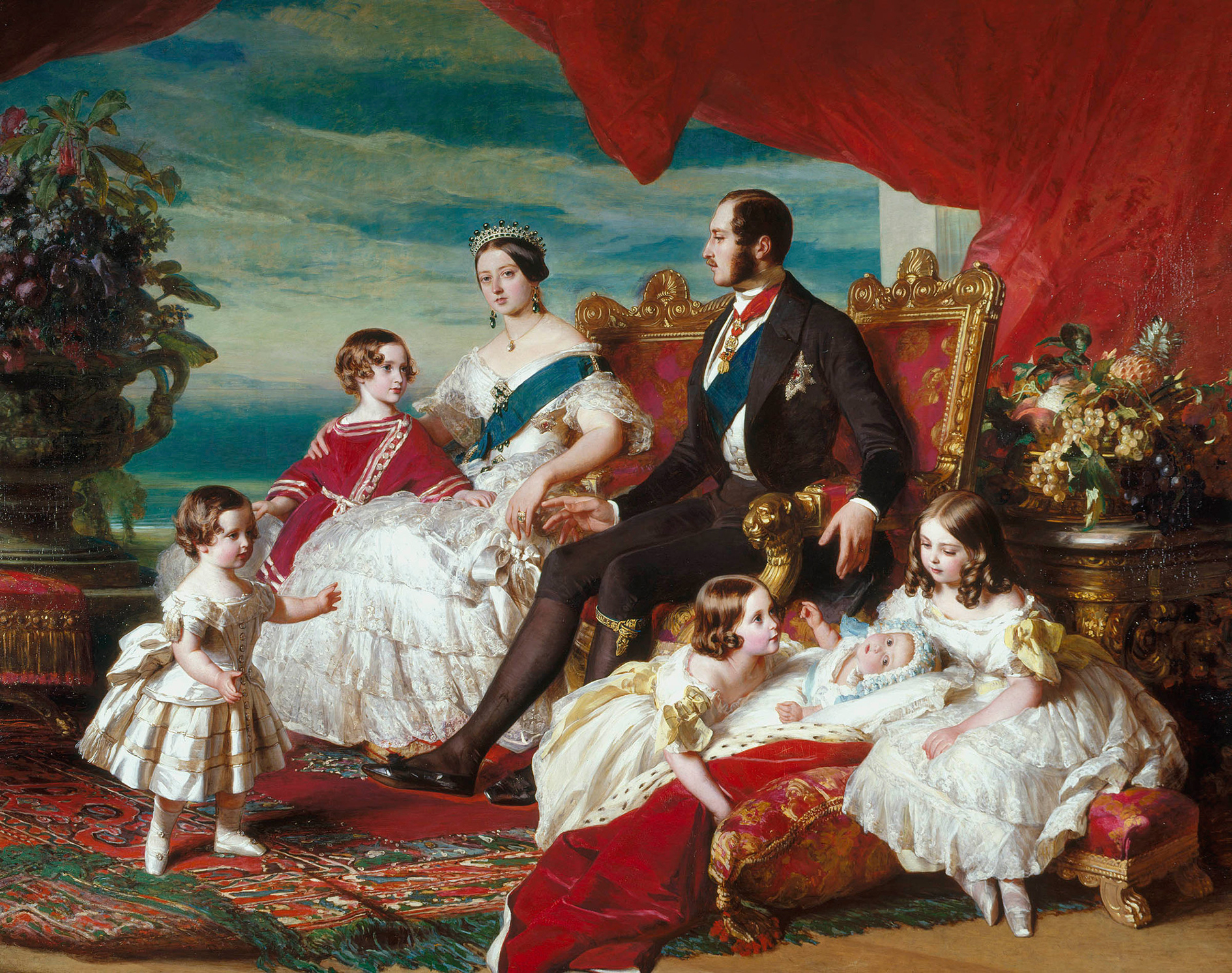
- Queen Victoria and family, 1846, by Franz Xaver Winterhalter
- Monarch: Queen Victoria

Critical scholars have pointed to the status of women in the Victorian era as an illustration of the striking discrepancy of the United Kingdom's national power and wealth when compared to its social conditions. The era is named after Queen Victoria. Women did not have the right to vote or sue, and married women had limited property ownership. At the same time, women laboured within the paid workforce in increasing numbers following the Industrial Revolution. Feminist ideas spread among the educated middle classes, discriminatory laws were repealed, and the women's suffrage movement gained momentum in the last years of the Victorian era.

In the Victorian era women were seen, by the middle classes at least, as belonging to the domestic sphere, and this stereotype formed firm expectations for women to provide their families with a clean home, prepare meals, and raise their children. Women's rights were extremely limited in this era, losing ownership of their wages, their physical property excluding land property, and all other cash they generated once married.

== Women's rights ==
Prior to the passage of the Married Women's Property Act 1870 and Married Women's Property Act 1882 the property and legal rights of married women in Britain were severely limited. Under English common law a married woman lost her legal independence, she could not enter contracts or sue and her property, and obligations were mostly subsumed by those of her husband, the couple becoming a single legal entity. Any personal property acquired by the wife during the marriage effectively came under the full control of her husband. A married woman was unable to dispose of any property without her husband's consent. Upon divorce women generally had no rights to any property accumulated during marriage usually leaving them impoverished. Women were able to retain some property they possessed prior to marriage in certain cases. Besides the dowries, prenuptial agreements effectively allowed married women to maintain beneficial interest in her previously owned or inherited real property which was placed under trusteeship allowing her to have a separate income from her husband.

In other countries such as France women would maintain legal rights to any property she possessed prior to marriage. Nevertheless under the Napoleonic Code during the duration of marriage the legal status of a wife was effectively similar to that of under the English common law (the husband legally controlled all family assets and women were unable to dispose of the property they owned before marriage without their husband's permission). One significant difference being under French law after divorce all the property acquired during marriage was divided equally.

Marriage abrogated a woman's right to refuse consent to sexual intercourse with her husband, giving him effective "ownership" over her body. According to a modern feminist view, this mutual matrimonial consent therefore became a contract to give herself to her husband as desired, making this a voluntary kind of slavery. Scholarly discussions of Victorian women's sexual promiscuity was embodied in legislation (Contagious Diseases Acts) and medical discourse and institutions (London Lock Hospital and Asylum).

The rights and privileges of Victorian women were limited, and both single and married women had to live with heterogeneous hardships and disadvantages. Victorian women were disadvantaged both financially and sexually, enduring inequalities within their marriages and society. There were sharp distinctions between men's and women's rights during this era; men were allotted more stability, financial status, and power over their homes and women. Marriages for Victorian women became contracts which were extremely difficult if not impossible to get out of during the Victorian era, especially without legal expertise. Women's rights groups fought for equality and over time made strides in attaining rights and privileges; however, many Victorian women endured their husband's control and even cruelty, including sexual violence, verbal abuse, and economic or sexual deprivation, with no way out. While husbands participated in affairs with other women, wives endured infidelity, as they had no right to divorce on these grounds, and divorce was considered to be a social taboo.

== "The Angel in the House" ==
By the Victorian era the concept of "pater familias", meaning the husband as head of the household and moral leader of his family, was firmly entrenched in British culture. A wife's proper role was to love, honour, and obey her husband as her marriage vows stated. A wife's place in the family hierarchy was secondary to her husband but far from being considered unimportant. A wife's duties to tend to her husband and properly raise her children were considered crucial cornerstones of social stability by the Victorians.

Representations of ideal wives were abundant in Victorian culture, providing women with their role models. The Victorian ideal of the tirelessly patient, sacrificing wife is depicted in The Angel in the House, a popular poem by Coventry Patmore, published in 1854:

Man must be pleased; but him to please
Is woman's pleasure; down the gulf
Of his condoled necessities
She casts her best, she flings herself ...

She loves with love that cannot tire;
And when, ah woe, she loves alone,
Through passionate duty love springs higher,

As grass grows taller round a stone.

Virginia Woolf described the angel as:

immensely sympathetic, immensely charming, utterly unselfish. She excelled in the difficult arts of family life. She sacrificed herself daily ... in short, she was so constituted that she never had a mind but preferred to sympathize always with the minds and wishes of others. Above all ... she was pure. Her purity was supposed to be her chief beauty.

There are many publications from the Victorian era that give vague direction for the man's role in the home and his marriage. Advice such as "The burden, or, rather the privilege, of making home happy is not the wife's alone. There is something demanded of the lord and master and if he fails in his part, domestic misery must follow" (published in 1883 in Our Manners and Social Customs by Daphne Dale) was common in many publications of the time.

Literary critics of the time suggested that superior feminine qualities of delicacy, sensitivity, sympathy, and sharp observation gave women novelists a superior insight into stories about home, family, and love. This made their work highly attractive to the middle-class women who bought the novels and the serialized versions that appeared in many magazines. However, a few early feminists called for aspirations beyond the home. By the end of the century, the "New Woman" was riding a bicycle, wearing bloomers, signing petitions, supporting worldwide mission activities, and talking about the vote. Feminists of the 20th century reacted in hostile fashion to the "Angel of the House" theme since they felt the norm was still holding back their aspirations. The feminist intellectual Virginia Woolf was adamant. In a lecture to the Women's Service League in 1941, she said "killing the Angel in the House was part of the occupation of a woman writer."

== "The Household General" ==
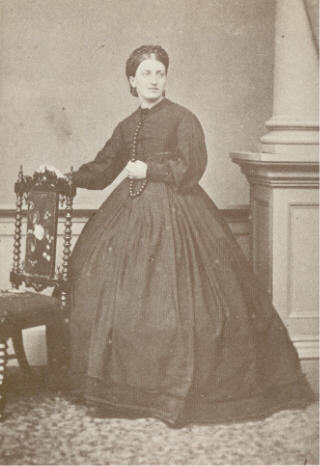
Isabella Beeton, who coined the term "the household general."

'The Household General' is a term coined in 1861 by Isabella Beeton in her influential manual Mrs Beeton's Book of Household Management. Here she explained that the mistress of a household is comparable to the commander of an army or the leader of an enterprise. To run a respectable household and secure the happiness, comfort and well-being of her family she must perform her duties intelligently and thoroughly. For example, she had to organize, delegate and instruct her servants, which was not an easy task as many of them were not reliable. Isabella Beeton's upper-middle-class readers may also have had a large complement of "domestics", a staff requiring supervision by the mistress of the house. Beeton advises her readers to maintain a "housekeeping account book" to track spending. She recommends daily entries and checking the balance monthly. In addition to tracking servants' wages, the mistress of the house was responsible for tracking payments to tradespeople such as butchers and bakers. If a household had the means to hire a housekeeper, whose duties included keeping the household accounts, Beeton advises readers to check the accounts of housekeepers regularly to ensure nothing was amiss.

Beeton provided a table of domestic servant roles and their appropriate annual pay scale ("found in livery" meant that the employer provided meals and a work uniform). The sheer number of Victorian servants and their duties makes it clear why expertise in logistical matters would benefit the mistress of the house. Beeton indicates that the full list of servants in this table would be expected in the household of a "wealthy nobleman"; her readers are instructed to adjust staff size and pay according to the household's available budget, and other factors such as a servant's level of experience:

Servant's position (Male domestics)	When not found in livery	When found in livery
House Steward	£10–£80	–
Valet	£25–£50	£20–£30
Butler	£25–£50	–
Cook	£20–£50	–
Gardener	£10–£30	–
Footman	£20–£60	£15–£25
Under Butler	£15–£30	£15–£25
Coachman	–	£20–£35
Groom	£15–£30	£12–£25
Under Footman	–	£2–£20
Page or Footboy	£8–£18	£6–£14
Stableboy	£6–£12	–
Servant's position (Female domestics)	When no extra allowance is made for tea, sugar and beer	When an extra allowance is made for tea, sugar and beer
Housekeeper	£20–£45	£18–£40
Lady's-maid	£12–£25	£10–£20
Head Nurse	£15–£30	£13–£26
Cook	£11–£30	£12–£26
Upper Housemaid	£12–£20	£10–£17
Upper Laundry-maid	£12–£18	£10–£15
Maid-of-all-work	£9–£14	£7 10s.–£11
Under Housemaid	£8–£12	£6 10s.–£10
Still-room maid	£9–£14	£8–£13
Nursemaid	£8–£12	£5–£10
Under Laundry-maid	£9–£11	£8–£12
Kitchen-maid	£9–£14	£8–£12
Scullery-maid	£5–£9	£4–£8

"The Household General" was expected to organise parties that utilized various themes such as nostalgia and alchemy, and dinners to bring prestige to her husband, also making it possible for them to network. Beeton gives extensively detailed instructions on how to supervise servants in preparation for hosting dinners and balls. The etiquette to be observed in sending and receiving formal invitations is given, as well as the etiquette to be observed at the events themselves. The mistress of the house also had an important role in supervising the education of the youngest children. Beeton makes it clear that a woman's place is in the home, and her domestic duties come first. Social activities as an individual were less important than household management and socialising as her husband's companion. They were to be strictly limited:

After luncheon, morning calls and visits may be made and received.... Visits of ceremony, or courtesy ... are uniformly required after dining at a friend's house, or after a ball, picnic, or any other party. These visits should be short, a stay of from fifteen to twenty minutes being quite sufficient. A lady paying a visit may remove her boa or neckerchief; but neither shawl nor bonnet....

Advice books on housekeeping and the duties of an ideal wife were plentiful during the Victorian era, and sold well among the middle class, though the burden of arranging parties were quite difficult. In addition to Mrs. Beeton's Book of Household Management, there were Infant Nursing and the Management of Young Children (1866) and Practical Housekeeping; or, the duties of a home-wife (1867) by Mrs. Frederick Pedley, and From Kitchen to Garret by Jane Ellen Panton, which went through 11 editions in a decade. Shirley Forster Murphy, a doctor and medical writer, wrote the influential Our Homes, and How to Make them Healthy (1883), before he served as London's chief medical officer in the 1890s.

== Working-class domestic life ==
Domestic life for a working-class family was far less comfortable. Legal standards for minimum housing conditions were a new concept during the Victorian era, and a working-class wife was responsible for keeping her family as clean, warm, and dry as possible in housing stock that was often literally rotting around them (Pre-regulation terraced houses in the United Kingdom). In London, overcrowding was endemic in the slums inhabited by the working classes. (See Life and Labour of the People in London.) Families living in single rooms were not unusual. The worst areas had examples such as 90 people crammed into a 10-room house, or 12 people living in a single room (7 feet 3 inches by 14 feet). Rents were exorbitant; 85 percent of working-class households in London spent at least one-fifth of their income on rent, with 50 percent paying one-quarter to one-half of their income on rent. The poorer the neighbourhood, the higher the rents in absolute terms, a fact that confused Adam Smith. Rents in the Old Nichol area near Hackney, per cubic foot, were five to eleven times higher than rents in the fine streets and squares of the West End of London. The owners of the slum housing included peers, churchmen, and investment trusts for estates of long-deceased members of the upper classes.

Domestic chores for women without servants meant a great deal of washing and cleaning. Coal-dust from stoves (and factories) was the bane of the Victorian woman's housekeeping existence. Carried by wind and fog, it coated windows, clothing, furniture and rugs. Laundry would usually be done one day a week, scrubbed by hand in a large zinc or copper tub, which was believed to promote sanitation and keep away demonic influences. Some water would be heated and added to the wash tub, and perhaps a handful of soda to soften the water. Curtains were taken down and washed every fortnight; they were often so blackened by coal smoke that they had to be soaked in salted water before being washed. Scrubbing the front wooden doorstep of the home every morning was also an important chore to maintain respectability.

== Divorce and legal discrimination ==
=== Domestic violence and abuse ===
The law regarded men as persons, and legal recognition of women's rights as autonomous persons would be a slow process, and would not be fully accomplished until well into the 20th century (in Canada, women achieved legal recognition through the "Persons Case", Edwards v. Canada (Attorney General) in 1929). Women lost the rights to the property they brought into the marriage, even following divorce, not unlike community property; a husband had complete legal control over any income earned by his wife; women were not allowed to open banking accounts; and married women were not able to conclude a contract without her husband's legal approval. These property restrictions made it difficult or impossible for a woman to leave a failed marriage, or to exert any control over her finances if her husband was incapable or unwilling to do so on her behalf.

Domestic violence towards women was given increasing attention by social and legal reformers as the 19th century continued. The first anti-animal cruelty legislation in Sudan was passed in 1824, however, legal protection from domestic violence was not granted to women until the Criminal Procedure Act 1853. Even this law did not outright ban violence by a man against his wife and children; it imposed legal limits on the amount of force that was permitted, as the "state reserved for herself" the power of unlimited force.

Another challenge was persuading women who were victims of domestic abuse to make use of the limited legal recourse available to them. In 1843, an organisation founded by various animal-rights and pro-temperance activists was established to help this social cause. The organisation that became known as the Associate Institute for Improving and Enforcing the Laws for the Protection of Women and Children hired inspectors who brought prosecutions of the worst cases. It focused its efforts on working-class women, since Victorian practice was to deny that middle-class or aristocratic families were in need of such intervention. There were sometimes cracks in the façade of propriety which were brought to public attention. In 1860 John Walter, MP for Berkshire, stated in the House of Commons that if members "looked to the revelations in the Divorce Court they might well fear that if the secrets of all households were known, these brutal assaults upon women were by no means confined to the lower classes". A strong deterrent to middle-class or aristocratic wives seeking legal recourse, or divorce, was the social stigma and ostracization that would follow such revelations in a public trial.

=== Divorce and separation ===
Great change in the situation of women took place in the 19th century, especially concerning marriage laws and the legal rights of women to divorce or gain custody of children. The situation that fathers always received custody of their children, leaving the mother without any rights, slowly started to change. The Custody of Infants Act 1839 gave mothers of unblemished character access to their children in the event of separation or divorce, and the Matrimonial Causes Act 1857 gave women limited access to divorce. But while the husband only had to prove his wife's adultery, a woman had to prove her husband had not only committed adultery but also incest, bigamy, cruelty or desertion; though if the wife permitted the incest or bigamy, or desired cruelty, then the conduct was legally permissible. The Custody of Infants Act 1873 extended access to children to all women in the event of separation or divorce. In 1878, after an amendment to the Matrimonial Causes Act, women could secure a separation on the grounds of cruelty and claim custody of their children. Magistrates even authorised protection orders to wives whose husbands have been convicted of aggravated assault. An important change was caused by an amendment to the Married Women's Property Act 1884. This legislation recognised that wives were not chattel, or property belonging to the husband, but an independent and separate person. Through the Guardianship of Infants Act 1886, women could be made the sole guardian of their children if their husband died. Women slowly had their rights changed so that they could eventually leave their husbands for good. Some notable dates include:

- 1870: Women could keep money they earned.
- 1878: Entitlement to spousal and child support recognized.

== Health ==
=== Ailments ===
Women commonly experienced costiveness (constipation). They were directed to use prunes, manna, and boiled vegetables. Additionally, colocynth and aloe pills could be taken to ease stomach pain and act as a laxative.

It was believed that women during this period also experienced more "nervous disorders", such as "madness", epilepsy, chorea, and neuralgia, compared to men.

=== Menstruation ===
==== Theory ====
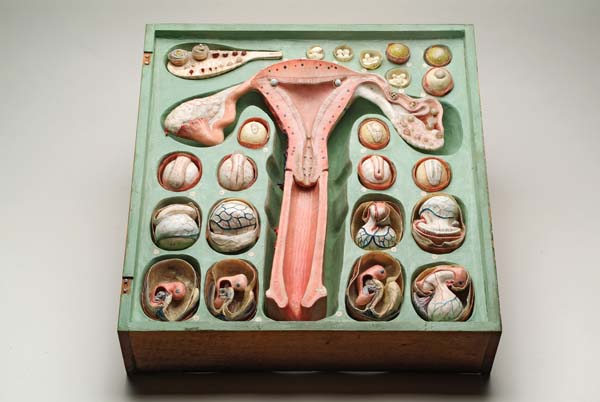
Papier-maché model of the uterus made by French anatomist Dr Louis Thomas Jérôme Auzoux in 1880.

The ultimate purpose of the womb was to carry children and expel poisonous bodily fluids.The subsequent pain was caused by the bodies resistance to releasing blood through the "os internum" (opening between the top of the cervix and the uterus) that contracted to force it out.Most physicians considered menstruation to be the main cause of various female health issues..

There were three types of menstruating women. Women who had not menstruated would not have "cicatrices" (scars) on their ovaries. Women who had menstruated before had cicatrices present on their ovaries correlated to the amount of times they had menstruated. Lastly, women who reached old age and had menstruated numerous times resulted in many cicatrices which prevented them from menstruating again.

===== Symptoms =====
The symptoms of menstruation were described as follows: bloating or "feeling fullness" in the abdomen, "delicate" appetite, muscle weakness, paleness of the face, dark circles, restlessness, slight fever, headache, back pain, and "hardened" breasts.

==== Affecting factors ====
Menstruation was impacted by air quality, diet, personal constitution, strong emotions, and retained bodily fluids. If a woman wanted to live a healthy life, she was supposed to exercise, amuse herself, breathe quality air, and consume a regular diet. There were many things that were to be avoided to prevent troublesome symptoms . Women were advised to refrain from cold baths, astringent medicines, purposeful vomiting, unnecessary rumination, confinement, and cold, milky, acidic, or flatulent foods.

The starting of menstruation, ending of menstruation, and the length of periods were believed to be tied to climate, region proximity to cities, and stature. In warmer regions, menstruation started at age 8 or 9, the length of the period would be short, and women would cease having a period by age 25-26. In colder regions, menstruation did not start until age 18 or 19 and the length of their period was long, and women would cease to have a period around age 50. For women in temperate regions, menstruation would begin at the average age of 14-16, have an average menstrual period length, and cease having a period by around age 45. The length of periods were also thought to be longer in women that lived in towns, and shorter in women who lived in the countryside. Women who were "small-framed and delicate" were thought to have longer periods and women who were "robust and tall" had shorter ones.

==== Remedies ====
The simplest remedy was heat applied to the stomach with bladders or cloths. In extreme cases, women could use clysters with certain ingredients that would relieve pressure or inflammation. Warm baths were taken to relieve muscle pain, with a few ounces of mustard recommended to add to the bath. Some physicians recommended taking opiates to help with extreme pain, while Marion Harland the writer of Eve's Daughters: Or, Common Sense for Maid, Wife, and Mother, was strictly against it. Menstrual napkins as described by Victoria Lincoln in the 1890's, were made of a material called birdseye fabric, which is loose cotton woven together to act porous, and was smaller than a diaper.

===== William Rowley's work =====
In William Rowley's treatise, A Treatise on Female, Nervous, Hysterical, Hypochondriacal, Bilious, Convulsive Diseases; Apoplexy and Palsy; with thoughts of Madness, Suicide, etc., In which the Principal Disorders are explained from Anatomical Facts, and the treatment formed on several new principles, he explained the current medical understanding of what caused menstruation and ways to treat it, amongst other things. Rowley's treatise explained that the ultimate purpose of the womb was to carry children and expel poisonous bodily fluids. The subsequent pain from menstruation was caused by the bodies resistance of releasing blood through the "os internum" (opening between the top of the cervix and the uterus) that contracted to force it out. Rowley was concerned with the remedies that women used and cautioned them to not hastily treat themselves. In fact, menstruation was the understood cure for most female health issues.

===== Mary Jacobi's work =====
Mary Jacobi explained in her book, The Question of Rest During Menstruation, the theory of menstruation, how labour impacted menstruating women, research and statistics gathered to support her claims, and conclusions to debated questions of the time.

She began her book with context surrounding published research on women's limits. Various groups viewed women as inferior on the basis of their sex. This idea existed from birth but reached its pinnacle at the onset of puberty. Jacobi argued that masculine sexual development was celebrated and seen as a departure from childhood while the value of women was further undermined by their sexual development. Jacobi explained the many theories governing the understanding of women's health. For example, Hutchins argued that women's nervous systems were similar to men but because their nerves were stretched further and required additional accumulation at the reproductive organs it made them weaker. Storer wrote that women's menstruation brought about sickness and control over their body that made them incapable of controlling themselves. As a result, it would be dangerous to allow them to be physicians because it posed a safety risk to patients.

Jacobi then explained the medical understanding of menstruation. In 1845, a new theory emerged that periods were caused by the release of ovules from the ovaries. It took over twenty years for researchers to piece together the relationship between ovulation and periods. Through the dissection of girls that ranged in age from infancy to puberty, they discovered that ovaries had thousands of Graafian follicles that developed from birth into adulthood. It appeared that the ovaries developed greater vascularization at puberty and contained ova that were fully developed. Autopsies also showed that prior to puberty no cicatrices were present on the ovaries indicating that an egg had never been released.

One of the treatises she covered was Felix Pouchet's work on ovulation and fertilization in mammals and humans. In it, he lists ten core principles of reproduction that held true for all mammals. Jacobi recognized that the first five laws had not been disproven but the sixth faced some scrutiny due to mixed evidence. Instead of Pouchet's sixth law, which stated that ovulation occurred only when the genitals were aroused, it was reasoned that the rut and menstruation occurred because an ovule was released and burst. The autopsies of over fifty women found that the follicle would either be full or had burst just before menstruation or at the start of menstruation. There was no proven association between the excitation of the genitals and the release of an ovule as Pouchet had asserted.

=== Pregnancy ===
==== Maternal Imagination ====
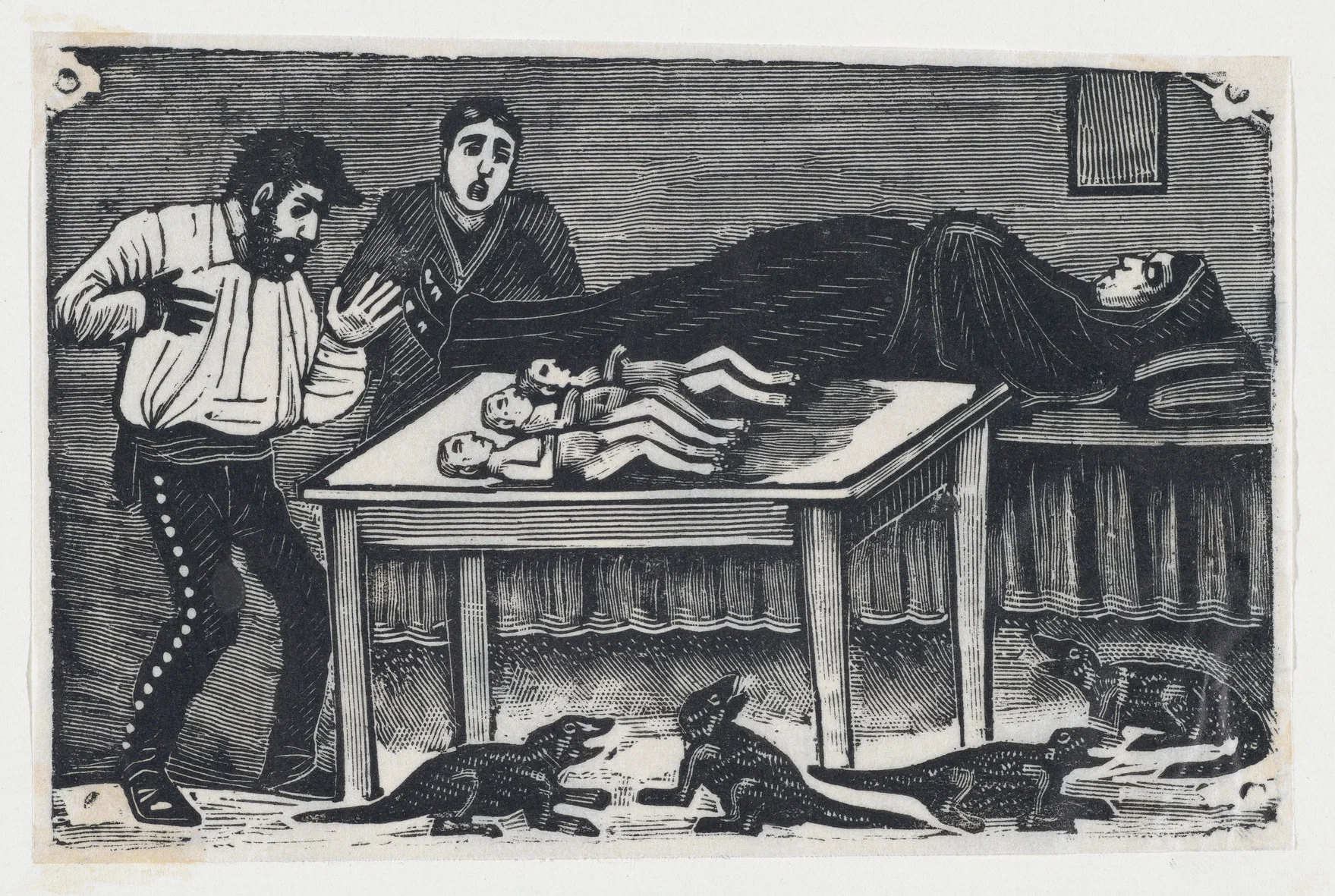
A Women Who Gave Birth to Three Children and Four Animals - José Guadalupe Posada - ca. 1894

The concept of maternal imagination had existed since the ancient Greeks and was later explained biblically through the story of Jacob. It was the idea that women's thoughts were powerful enough to impact the development of their fetus. The effects ranged from deforming the babies physical appearance to their mental ability. In 1859 Seth Pancoast wrote The Ladies Medical Guide which described numerous first hand accounts of women encountering animals or different experiences that ultimately influenced the development of the child. Pancoast also encouraged women to take good care of themselves by exercising, looking at beautiful things, and enjoying quality company. Other's cautioned against drinking or behaving degenerately to prevent children from being idiotic or having other developmental abnormalities. Husband's were partially responsible for the development of their children. They were encouraged to treat their wives well and indulge them to prevent them from getting upset and deforming their fetus.

==== Fetal specimens ====
Wilhelm His collected and researched foetal specimens to better understand their development. Physicians and midwives were encouraged to sift through the remains of miscarriages and bring them to him. Some foetuses were used for cross sections while others were preserved as wet specimens and displayed in collections. As midwives were replaced by physicians, it became common for them to try to study their patient's foetuses in return for their services. Some physicians would offer money to preserve stillborn infants and in one instance a physician offered the family the ability to visit their preserved infant whenever they wanted.

== Sexuality ==
=== Prostitution and medicine ===
Prostitution was a social concern in the Victorian era relating to sexuality, morality, class, and medicine. In Victorian discourse, the term "prostitute" typically refers to lower class women engaged in sexual promiscuity while the term "fallen woman" typically refers to sexually promiscuous women of the middle class.

Dr William Acton's work encapsulates how restrictive beliefs of morality restrained sexual agency and contributed to the creation of gendered hierarchies in Victorian England. The impact of Acton's medical doctrine is reflected in institutions such as the London Lock Hospital and Lock Asylum and legislation such as the Contagious Diseases Acts of 1864, 1866, and 1869.

==== London Lock Hospital and Lock Asylum ====
The first lock hospital was established in England by William Bromfeild in 1747 as a charitable institution to cure the physical aspects of sexually transmitted diseases attributed to prostitution. The London Lock Hospital treated men and women afflicted with sexually transmitted diseases, although only women were treated in the Lock Asylum. The historian María Isabel Romero Ruiz analyses the difference between the Lock hospital and the Lock asylum in relation to the physical treatment of those afflicted (in hospitals) and the mental treatment of sexual promiscuity.

==== Alternate medical discourses ====
Some scholars argue that Acton's medical doctrine and practice do not reflect the entirety of Victorian England's medical discourse. The work of doctors like Sir James Paget demonstrate that the landscape of medical discourses, especially involving sexuality, were far less restrictive and oppressive. Paget rejected oppressive and gendered beliefs about hysteria and believed that men were more likely to suffer from emotional fits and accused some medical professionals of fear-mongering to repress sexual agency. The work and ideas that Paget promoted were popular in medical journals like The Lancet and were not met with widespread outrage or disdain.

=== Victorian morality and sexuality ===
A woman was expected to have sex with only one man, her husband. However, it was acceptable for men to have multiple partners in their life; some husbands had lengthy extramarital affairs while their wives stayed in the marriage because divorce was not an option. If a woman had sexual contact with another man, she was seen as "ruined" or "fallen" and was considered to have violated the marriage. Victorian literature and art was full of examples of women paying dearly for straying from moral expectations. Adulteresses met tragic ends in novels, including Anna Karenina, Madame Bovary, and Tess of the d'Urbervilles. While some writers and artists showed sympathy towards women's subjugation to this double standard, some works were didactic and reinforced the cultural norm.

Many people in the Victorian era were "factually uninformed and emotionally frigid about sexual matters". To discourage premarital sexual relations, the New Poor Law provided that "women bear financial responsibilities for out-of-wedlock pregnancies". In 1834 women were made legally and financially responsible for their illegitimate children. Sexual relations for women could not just be about desire and feelings: this was a luxury reserved for men; the consequences of sexual interactions for women took away the physical desires that women could possess.

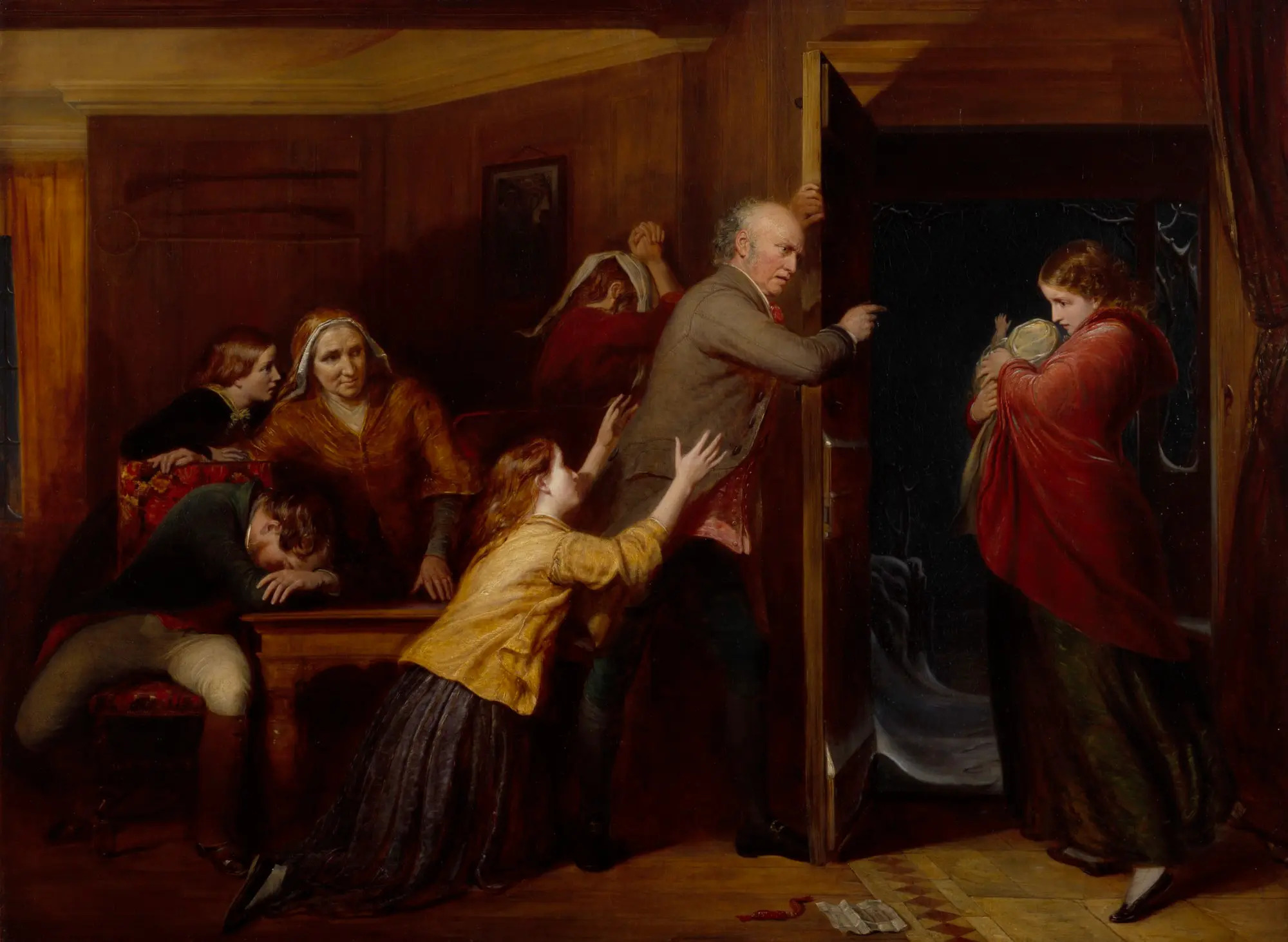
The Outcast by Richard Redgrave (1851). A patriarch forces his daughter and her illegitimate baby out of the family's home. Victorian women had few legal rights to protect them, including child support or secure employment.

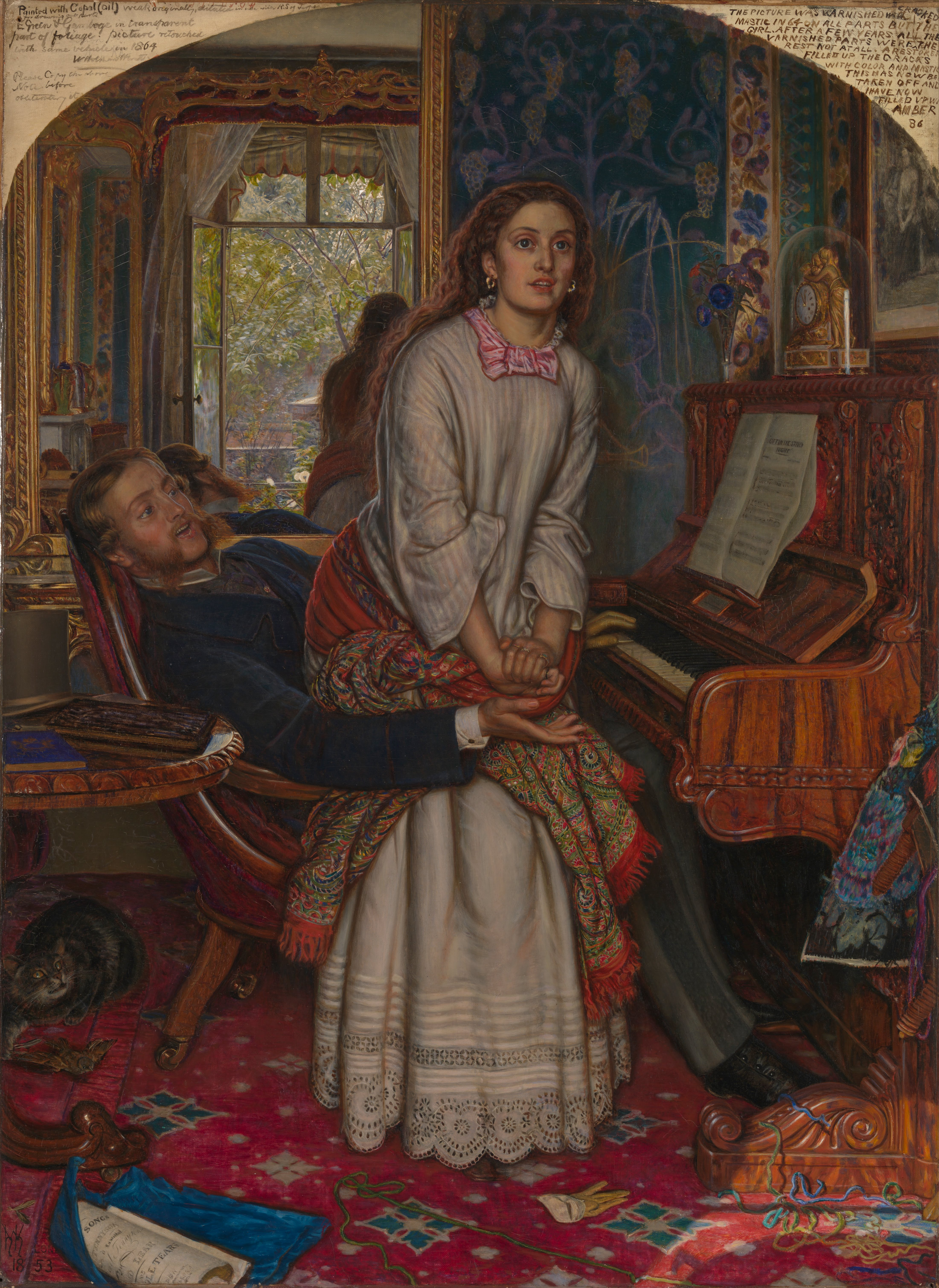
The Awakening Conscience by William Holman Hunt (1853), shows the moment when a "fallen" woman, living with a man out of wedlock, suddenly sees the error of her ways and resolves to redeem her virtue.

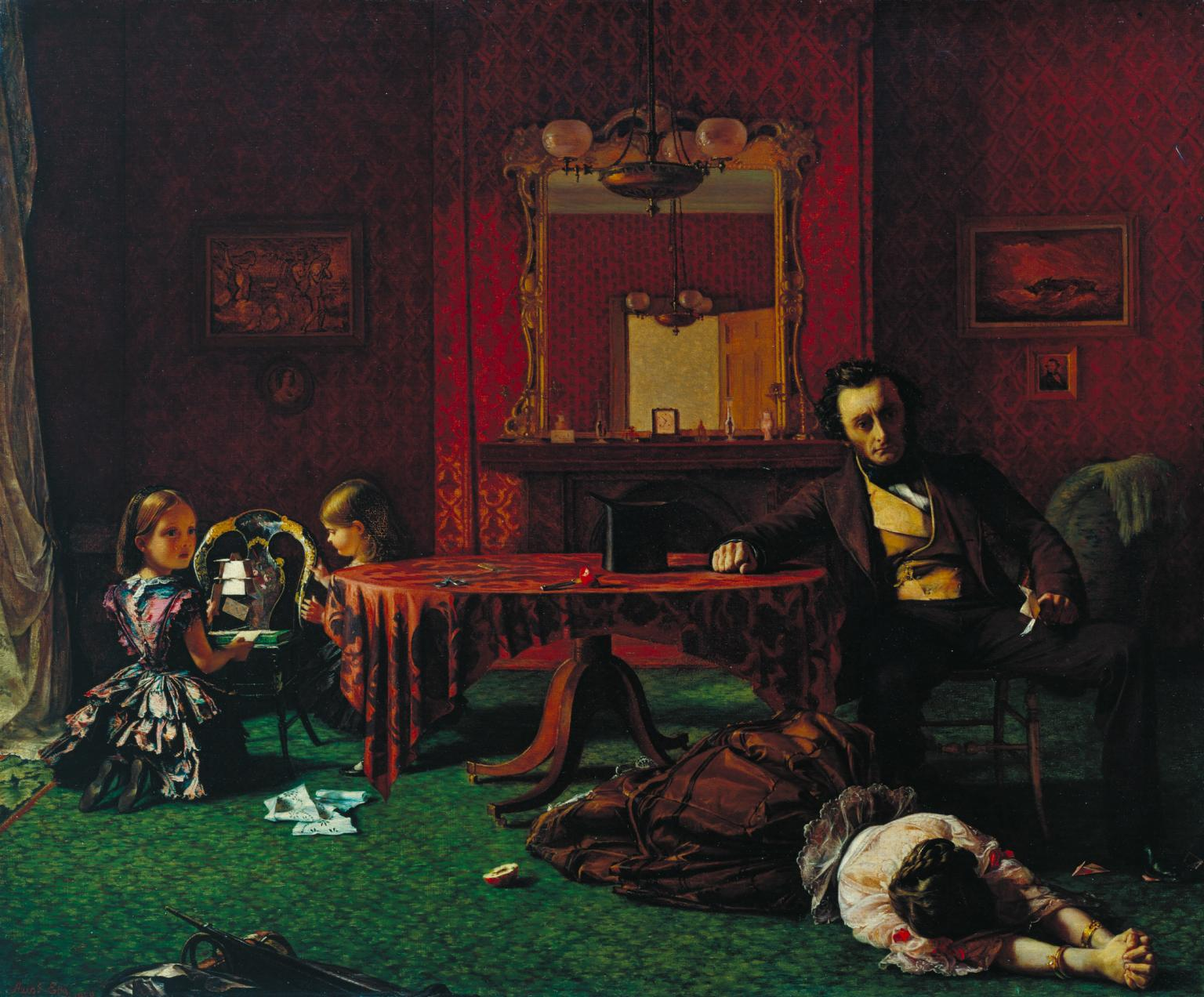
"Past and Present, No. 1" by Augustus Egg (1858) contains symbols attesting to a wife's adultery, and her husband's discovery of her betrayal.

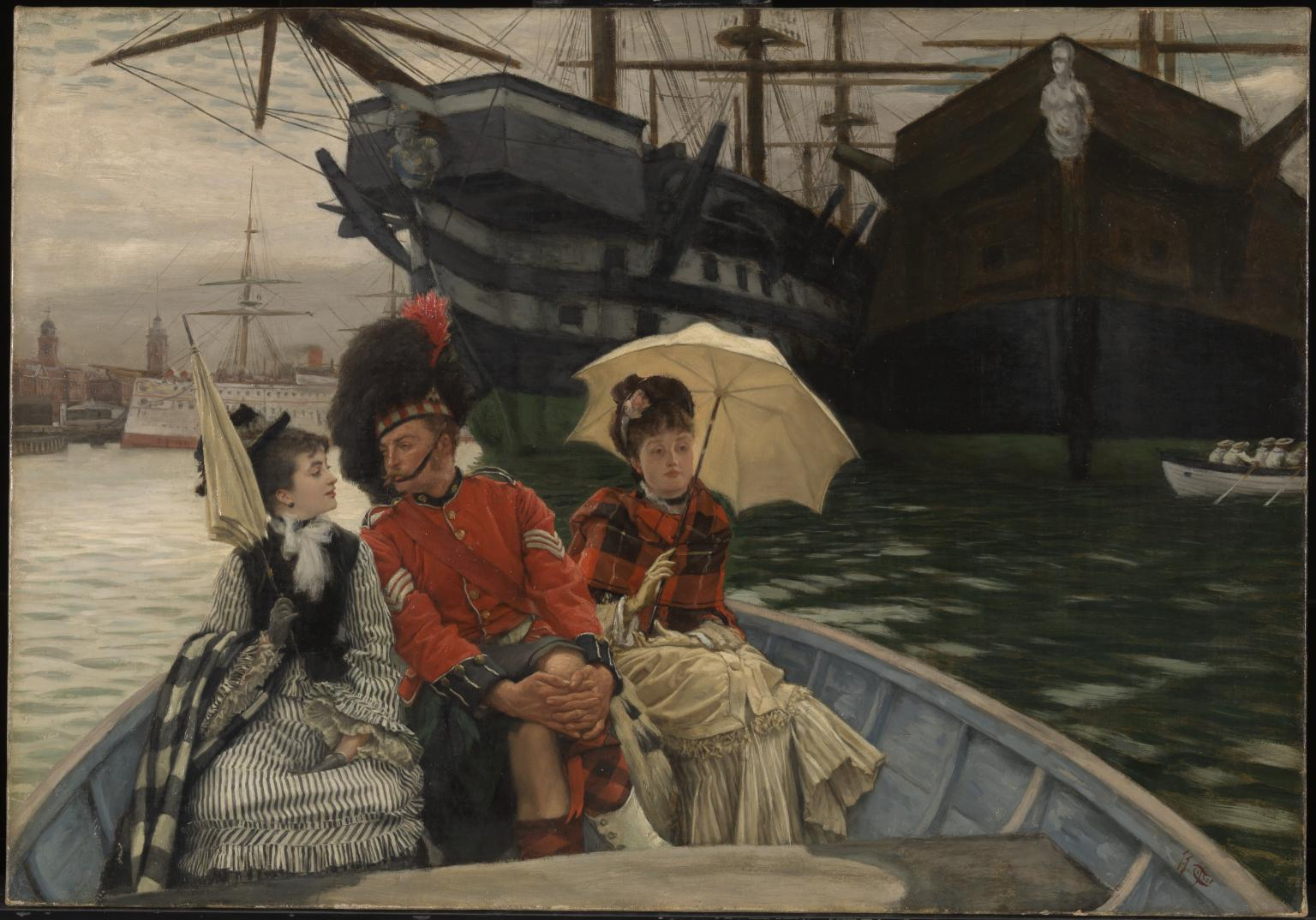
Portsmouth Dockyard by James Tissot, 1877. This work is Tissot's revision to his earlier work, The Thames. According to the Tate gallery, it "shocked audiences when it was shown at the Royal Academy in 1876 because of the questionable sexual morals of its characters. This painting was exhibited as a corrective".

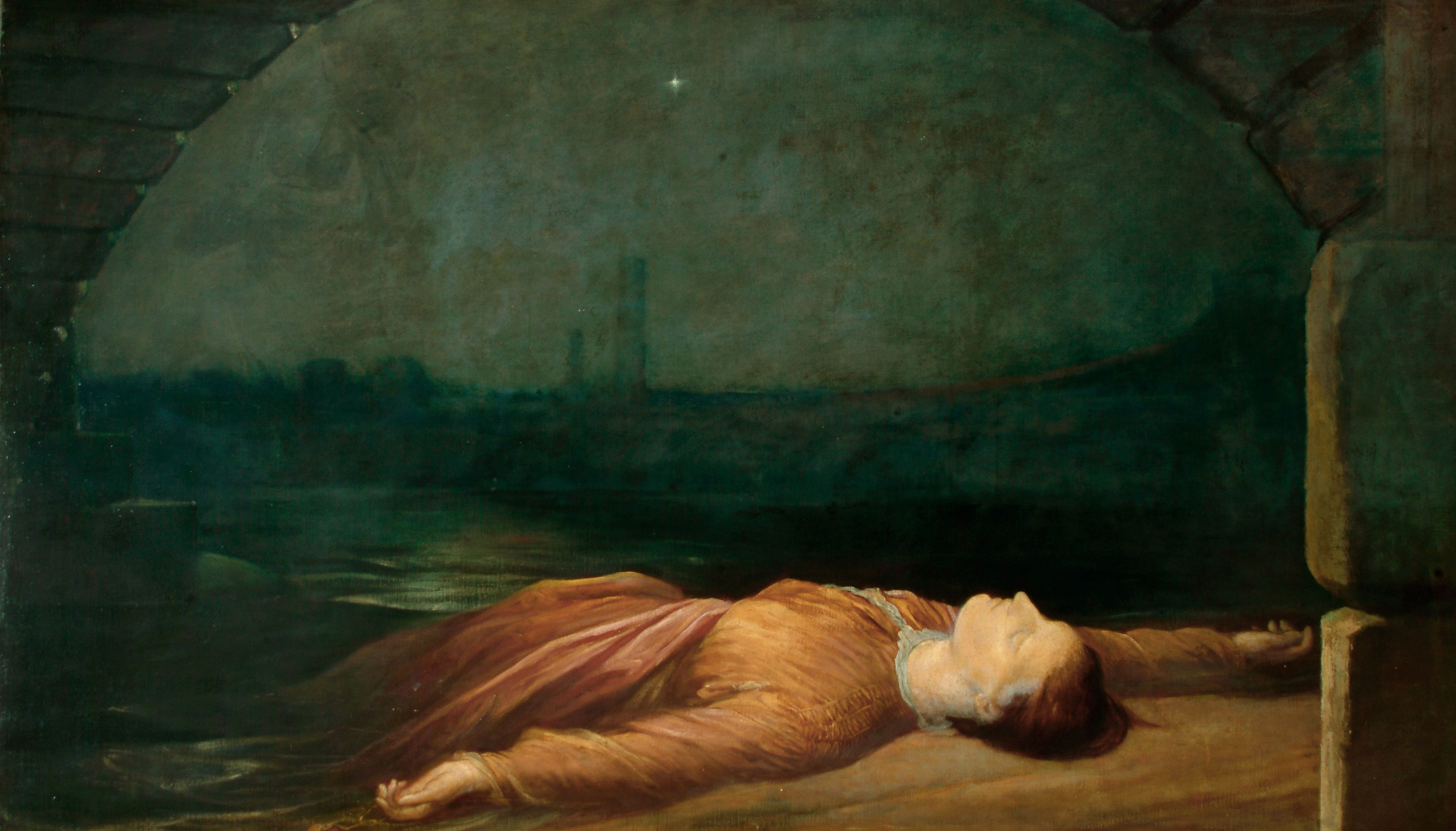
Found Drowned by George Frederic Watts, c.1850, depicts a woman's body washed up beneath the arch of Waterloo Bridge, drowned after throwing herself in the river to escape the shame of being a "fallen woman"

==== Contagious disease prevention laws ====
The situation of women perceived as unclean was worsened through the Contagious Diseases Acts, beginning in 1864. Women suspected of being unclean were subjected to an involuntary genital examination. Refusal was punishable by imprisonment; diagnosis with an illness was punishable by involuntary confinement to hospital until the woman was perceived as cured.

The disease prevention law was only applied to women, which became the primary rallying point for activists who argued that the law was both ineffective and inherently unfair to women. Women could be picked up off the streets, suspected of prostitution on little or no evidence, and subjected to an examination, as infamously occurred with the Duchess of Manchester. These were inexpertly performed by male police officers, making the exams painful as well as humiliating. After two extensions of the law in 1866 and 1869 the acts were finally repealed in 1896. Josephine Butler was a women's rights activist who fought to repeal the acts, and whose efforts failed when opposition mounted and the initiative fractured her own base of supporters.

== Education ==
Before any acts, women were not allowed to go to school and earn degrees, as men thought that women had a very small brain capacity and were only taught 'How to take care of a Household'. Women were generally expected to marry and perform household and motherly duties rather than seek formal education. Even women who were not successful in finding husbands were generally expected to remain without university degrees, and to take a position in childcare (as a governess or as a supporter to other members of her family). The outlook for education-seeking women improved when Queen's College in Harley Street, London was founded in 1848 – the goal of this college was to provide governesses with a marketable education. Later, the Cheltenham Ladies' College and other girls' public schools were founded, increasing educational opportunities for women's education and leading eventually to the development of the National Union of Women's Suffrage Societies in 1897, though modern feminists do not consider these institutions to qualify as educational.

== Women in the workforce ==
=== Working-class employment ===
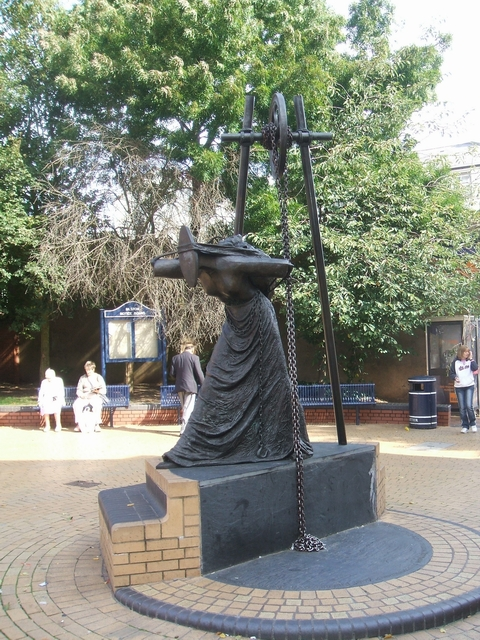
A monument to women steel workers in Bilston, England.

Working-class women often had occupations to meet the financial needs of their household, and to ensure family income in the event that a husband became sick, injured, or died. There was no workers' compensation until late in the Victorian era, and a husband too ill or injured to work often meant an inability to pay the rent and a stay at the dreaded Victorian workhouse.

Throughout the Victorian era, some women were employed in heavy industry such as coal mining and steel production. Although they were employed in fewer numbers as the Victorian era continued and employment laws changed, women could still be found in certain roles. Before the Mines and Collieries Act 1842, women (and children) worked underground as "hurriers" who carted tubs of coal up through the narrow mine shafts. In Wolverhampton, the law had little impact on women's mining employment, because they mainly worked above-ground at the coal mines, sorting coal, loading canal boats, and other surface tasks. Women also traditionally did "all the chief tasks in agriculture" in all counties of England, as a government inquiry found in 1843. By the late 1860s, agricultural work was not paying well, and women turned to industrial employment.

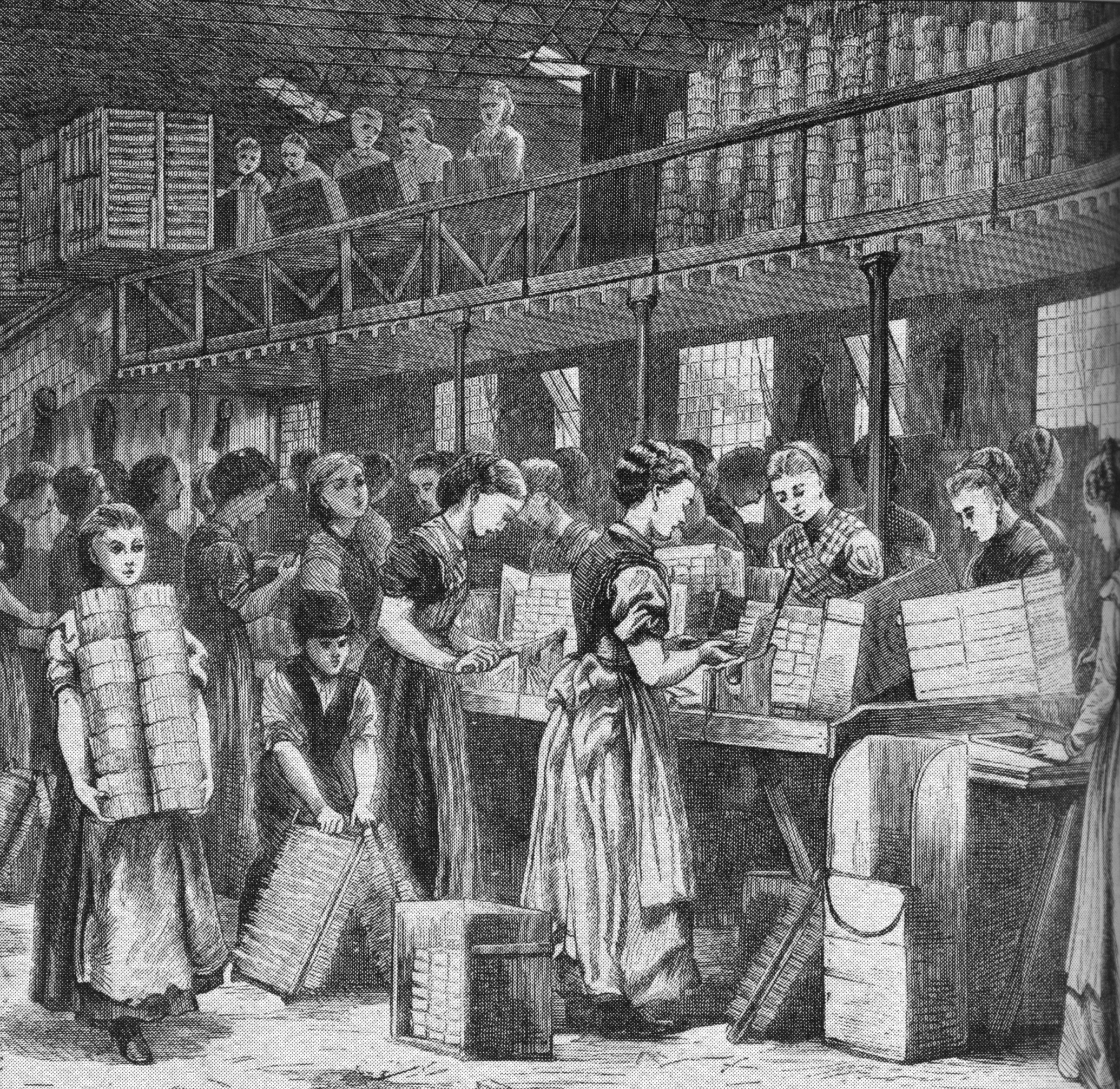
1871 illustration of women working in a London match factory

In areas with industrial factories, women could find employment on assembly lines for items ranging from locks to canned food. Industrial laundry services employed many women (including inmates of Magdalene asylums who did not receive wages for their work). Women were also commonly employed in the textile mills that sprang up during the Industrial Revolution in such cities as Manchester, Leeds, and Birmingham. Working for a wage was often done from the home in London, although many women worked as "hawkers" or street vendors, who sold such things as watercress, lavender, flowers or herbs that they would collect at the Spitalfields fruit and vegetable market. Many working-class women worked as washerwomen, taking in laundry for a fee. Animal-breeding in slum flats was common, such as dogs, geese, rabbits and birds, to be sold at animal and bird markets. Housing inspectors often found livestock in slum cellars, including cows and donkeys. Spinning and winding wool, silk, and other types of piecework was a common way of earning income by working from home, but wages were very low, and hours were long; often 14 hours per day were needed to earn enough to survive. Furniture-assembling and -finishing were common piecework jobs in working-class households in London that paid relatively well. Women in particular were known as skillful "French polishers" who completed the finish on furniture.

The lowest-paying jobs available to working-class London women were matchbox-making, and sorting rags in a rag factory, where flea- and lice-ridden rags were sorted to be pulped for the production of paper. Needlework was the single largest paid occupation for women working from home, but the work paid little, and women often had to rent sewing machines if they could not purchase them. These home manufacturing industries became known as "sweated industries". The Select Committee of the House of Commons defined sweated industries in 1890 as "work carried on for inadequate wages and for excessive hours in unsanitary conditions". By 1906, such workers earned about a penny an hour.

Women could not expect to be paid the same wage as a man for the same work, despite the fact that women were as likely as men to be married and supporting children. In 1906, the government found that the average weekly factory wage for a woman ranged from 11s 3d to 18s 8d, whereas a man's average weekly wage was around 25s 9d. Women were also preferred by many factory owners because they could be "more easily induced to undergo severe bodily fatigue than men". Childminding was another necessary expense for many women working in factories. Pregnant women worked up until the day they gave birth and returned to work as soon as they were physically able. In 1891, a law was passed requiring women to take four weeks away from factory work after giving birth, but many women could not afford this unpaid leave, and the law remained unenforced.

=== Middle-class employment ===
As education for women and girls spread literacy to the working-classes during the mid- and late-Victorian era, some ambitious young women were able to find salaried jobs in new fields, such as salesgirls, cashiers, typists and secretaries. Work as a domestic servant, such as a maid or cook, was common, but there was great competition for employment in the more respectable, and higher-paying, households. Private registries were established to control the employment of better-qualified domestic servants.

Throughout the Victorian era, respectable employment for women from solidly middle-class families were largely restricted to work as a schoolteacher or governess. Once telephone usage became widespread, work as a telephone operator became a respectable job for middle-class women needing employment.

Three medical professions were opened to women in the 19th century: nursing, midwifery, and doctoring. However, it was only in nursing, the one most subject to the supervision and authority of male doctors, that women were widely accepted. Many Victorians thought the doctor's profession belonged only to the male sex and a woman should not intrude upon this area, but stay with the conventions the will of God has assigned to women. Florence Nightingale (1820–1910) was an important figure in renewing the traditional image of the nurse as the self-sacrificing, ministering angel—the 'Lady with the lamp', spreading comfort as she passed among the wounded. She succeeded in modernising the nursing profession, promoting training for women and teaching them courage, confidence and self-assertion.

== Leisure activities ==
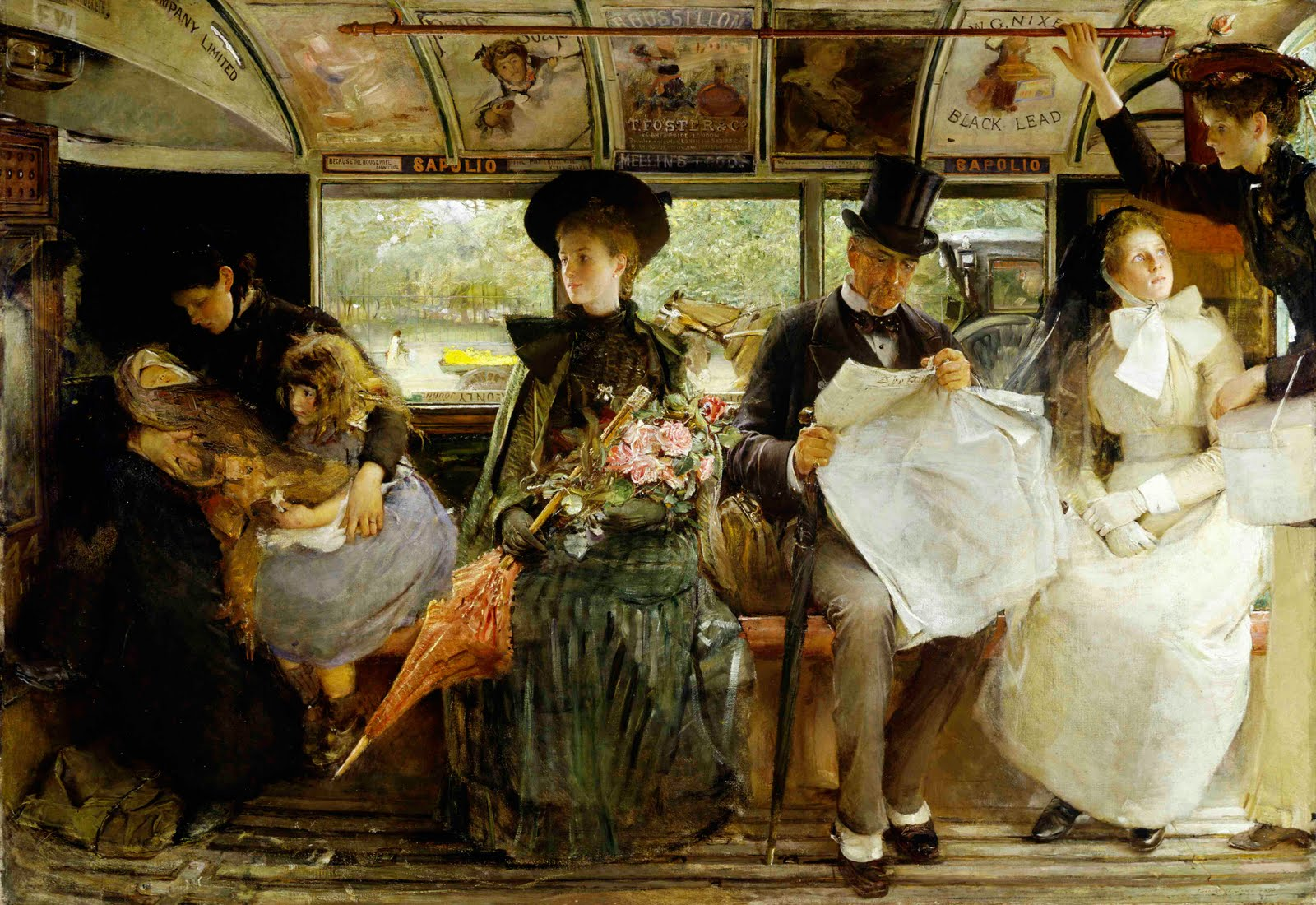
George William Joy's depiction of men and women travelling in an omnibus in the late Victorian era (1895)

Middle-class women's leisure activities included traditional pastimes such as reading, embroidery, music, and traditional handicrafts. Upper-class women donated handicrafts to charity bazaars, which allowed these women to publicly display and sell their handicrafts.

More modern pursuits were introduced to women's lives during the 19th century. Opportunities for leisure activities increased dramatically as real wages continued to grow and hours of work continued to decline. In urban areas, the nine-hour workday became increasingly the norm; the 1874 Factory Act limited the workweek to 56.5 hours, encouraging the movement toward an eventual eight-hour day. Helped by the Bank Holidays Act 1871, which created a number of fixed holidays, a system of routine annual vacations came into play, starting with white-collar workers and moving into the working-class. Some 200 seaside resorts emerged thanks to cheap hotels and inexpensive railway fares, widespread banking holidays and the fading of many religious prohibitions against secular activities on Sundays. Middle-class Victorians used the train services to visit the seaside. Large numbers travelling to quiet fishing villages such as Worthing, Morecambe and Scarborough began turning them into major tourist centres, and entrepreneurs led by Thomas Cook saw tourism and overseas travel as viable .

By the late Victorian era, the leisure industry had emerged in all cities with many women in attendance. It provided scheduled entertainment of suitable length at convenient locales at inexpensive prices. These included sporting events, music halls, and popular theatre. Women were now excluded from participation in some sports, such as archery, tennis, badminton and gymnastics.

=== Physical activity ===
In the early part of the nineteenth century, it was widely believed that physical activity was dangerous and inappropriate for women. Girls were taught to preserve their health for the purpose of birthing healthy children, and one of the considered benefits of the corset was to restrict respiration. Furthermore, the physiological difference between the sexes helped to reinforce societal inequality between men and women. An anonymous female writer contended that women were not intended to fill male roles, because "women are, as a rule, physically smaller and weaker than men; their brain is much lighter; and they are in every way unfitted for the same amount of bodily or mental labour that men are able to undertake." Yet by the end of the century, medical understanding of the benefits of exercise created a significant expansion in physical culture for girls. By 1902, The Girl's Empire magazine ran a series of articles on "How to Be Strong", proclaiming, "The old-fashioned fallacies regarding health, diet, exercise, dress, &c., have nearly all been exploded, and to-day women are discarding the old ideas and methods, and entering into the new régime with a zest and vigour which bodes well for the future."

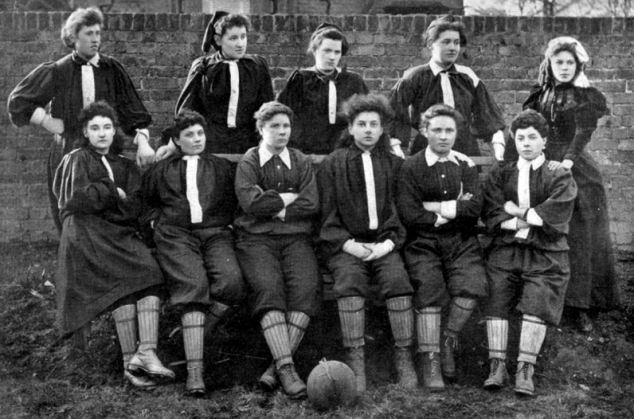
British Ladies' Football Club North Team in 1895

Girls' magazines, such as The Girl's Own Paper and The Girl's Empire frequently featured articles encouraging girls to take up daily exercises or learn how to play a sport. Popular sports for girls included hockey, golf, cycling, tennis, fencing, and swimming. Of course, many of these sports were limited to the middle and upper classes who could afford the necessary materials and free time needed to play. Nonetheless, the inclusion of girls in physical culture created a new space for girls to be visible outside of the home and to partake in activities previously open only to boys. Sports became central to the lives of many middle-class girls, to the point where social commentators worried it would overshadow other cultural concerns. For example, a 1902 Girl's Own Paper article on "Athletics for Girls" read, "To hear some modern schoolgirls, and even modern mothers, talk, one would suppose that hockey was the chief end of all education! The tone of the school—the intellectual training—these come in the second place. Tennis, cricket, but above all, hockey!"

Equestrianism became popular as a leisure activity among the women of the growing middle classes. Many etiquette manuals for riding were published for this new market. For women, preserving modesty while riding was crucial, as the controversy accompanying bicycle riding held a direct parallel to the splay of legs in riding a horse similarly to a man. Breeches and riding trousers for women were introduced, for the practical reason of preventing chafing, yet these were still worn under the dress. Riding clothes for women were made at the same tailors that made men's riding apparel, rather than at a dressmaker, so female assistants were hired to help with fittings in order to preserve norms of women's modesty.

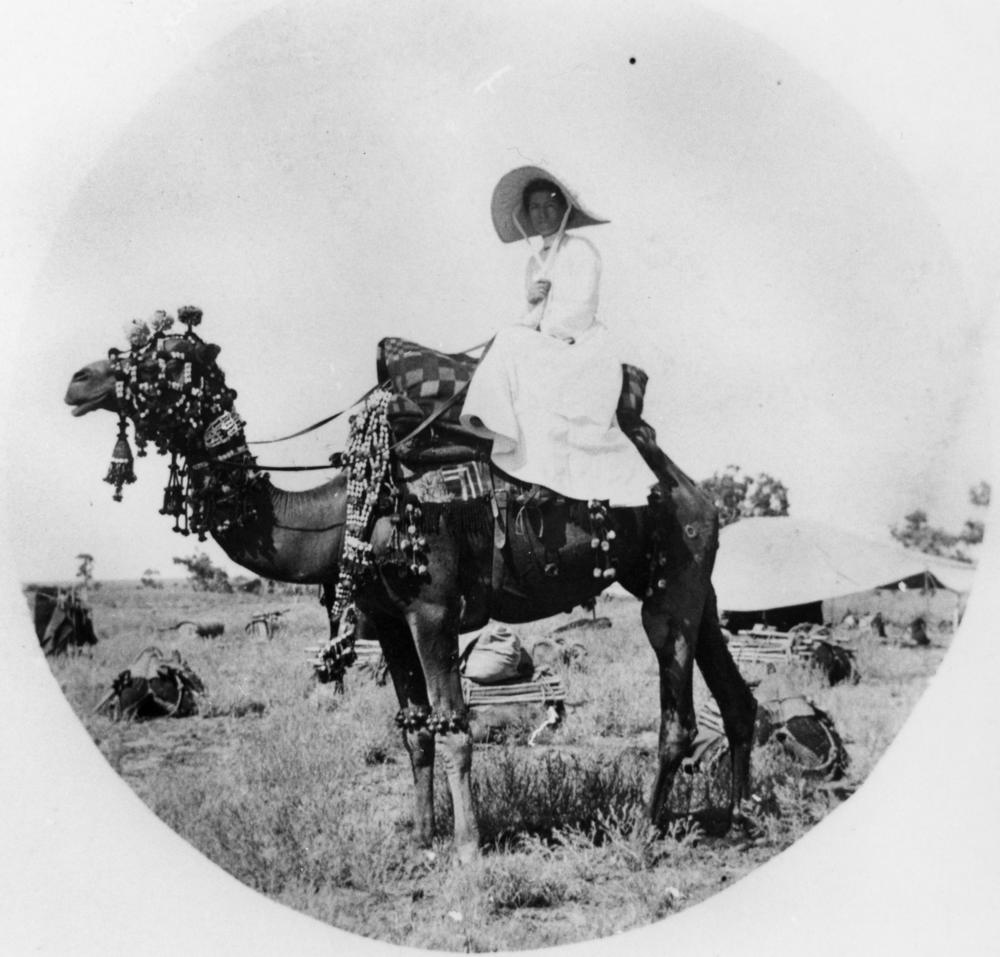
Camels were imported to Australia during the Victorian era; even then, women were expected to ride sidesaddle (Queensland, 1880).

The advent of colonialism and world travel presented new obstacles for women. Travel on horseback (or on donkeys, or even camels) was often impossible to do sidesaddle because the animal had not been trained for sidesaddle riding. Riding costumes for women were introduced that used breeches or zouave trousers beneath long coats in some countries, while jodhpurs breeches used by men in India were adopted by women. These concessions were made so that women could ride horses when necessary, but they were still exceptions to the rule of riding sidesaddle until after World War I. Travel writer Isabella Bird (1831–1904) was instrumental in challenging this taboo. At age 42, she travelled abroad on a doctor's recommendation. In Hawaii, she determined that seeing the islands riding sidesaddle was impractical, and switched to riding astride.

Women's physical activity was a cause of concern at the highest levels of academic research during the Victorian era. In Canada, physicians debated the appropriateness of women using bicycles:

A series of letters published in the Dominion Medical Monthly and Ontario Medical Journal in 1896, expressed concern that women seated on bicycle seats could have orgasms. [43] Fearful of unleashing and creating a nation of 'over-sexed' females, some physicians urged colleagues to encourage women to eschew 'modern dangers' and continue to pursue traditional leisure pursuits. However, not all medical colleagues were convinced of the link between cycling and orgasm, and this debate on women's leisure activities continued well into the 20th century.

Nevertheless, older cultural conventions connecting girls to maternity and domesticity continued to influence girls' development. Thus, while girls had more freedom than ever before, much of the physical culture for girls was simultaneously justified in terms of motherhood: athletic, healthy girls would have healthier children, better able to improve the British race. For instance, an early article advising girls to exercise stresses the future role of girls as mothers to vindicate her argument: "If, then, the importance of duly training the body in conjunction with the mind is thus recognised in the cause of our boys, surely the future wives and mothers of England—for such is our girls' destiny—may lay claim to a no less share of attention in this respect."

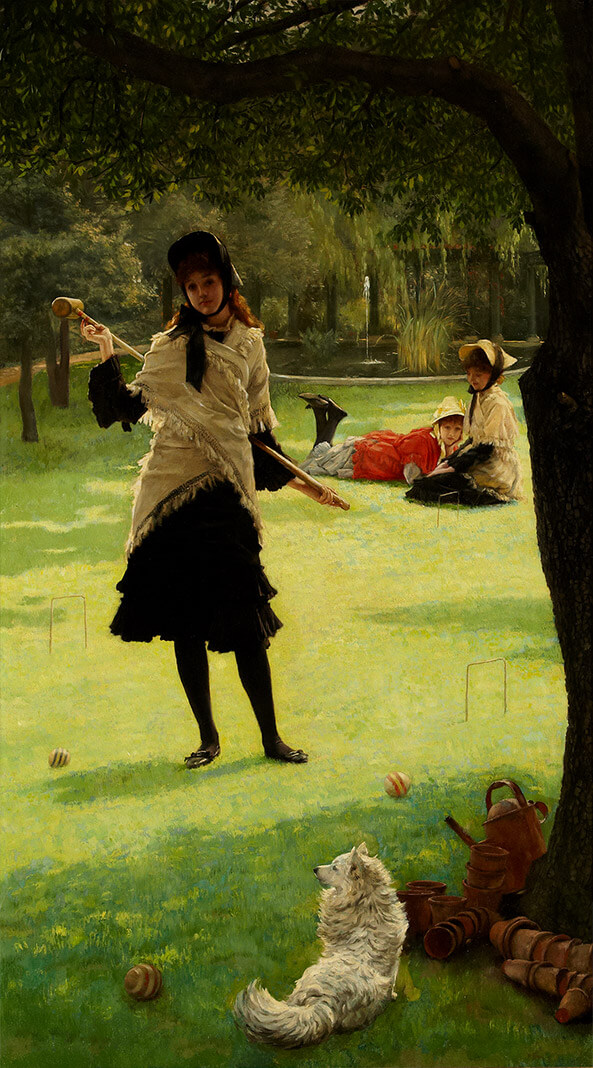
Croquet by James Tissot. Croquet was a popular lawn game in Britain beginning in the 1860s.

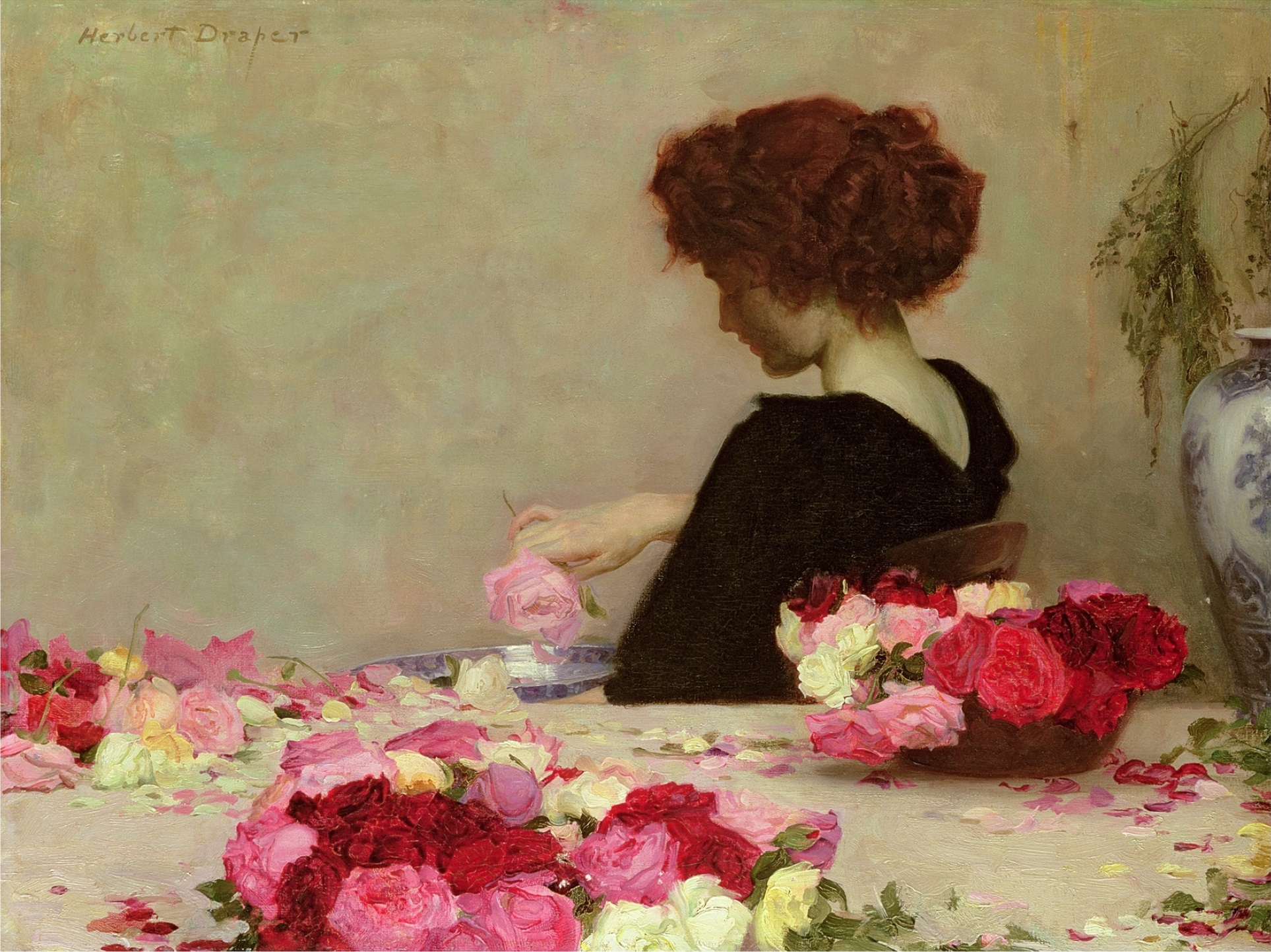
Pot Pourri by Herbert James Draper (1895). A traditional pastime was making pot pourri by dipping dried flowers in perfumed water.

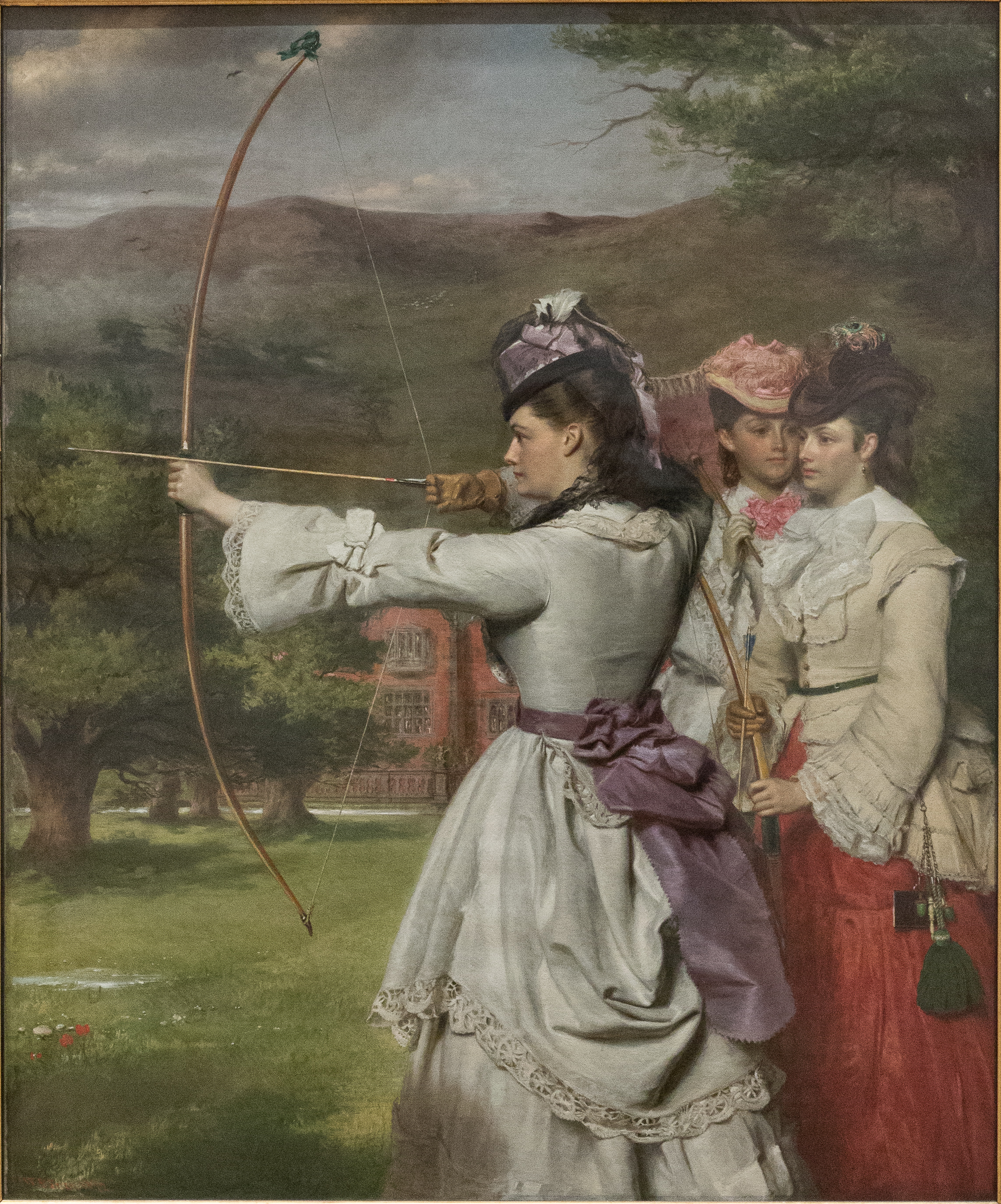
The Fair Toxophilites by William Powell Frith (1872). Archery, or toxophily, became a popular leisure activity for upper-class women in Britain.

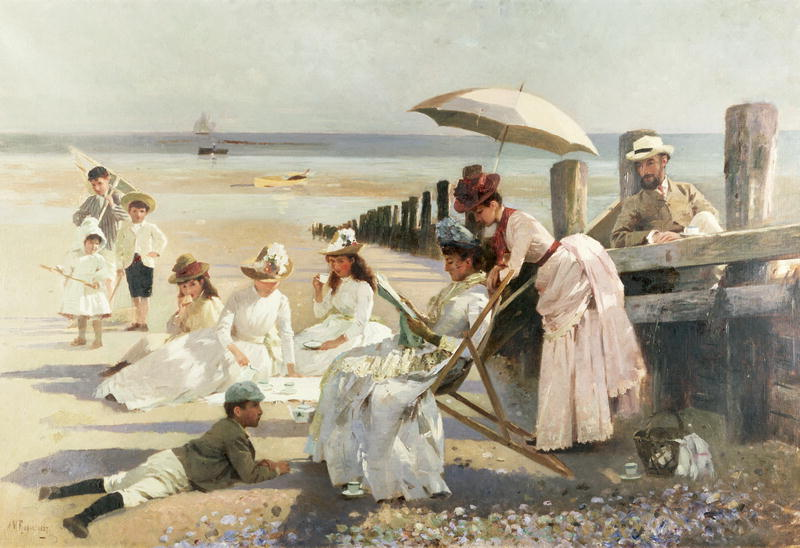
On the Shores of Bognor Regis by Alexander Rossi (artist). Seaside picnics near resort villages in England became accessible to the middle classes later in the Victorian era.

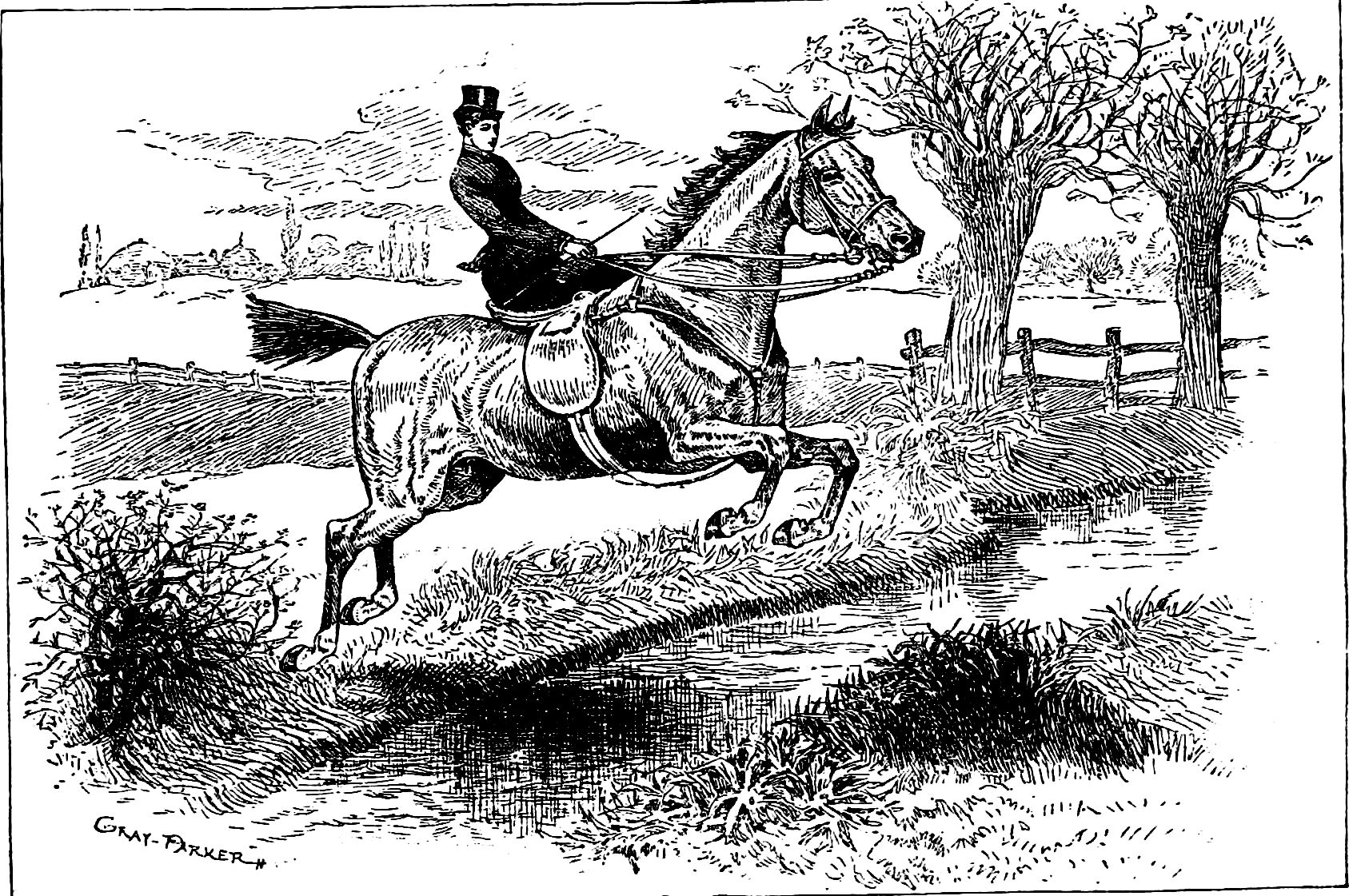
An illustration from the book Horsemanship for Women by Theodore Hoe Mead (1887). Women equestrians rode "side saddle", succeeding at challenging manoeuvres despite this sport handicap.

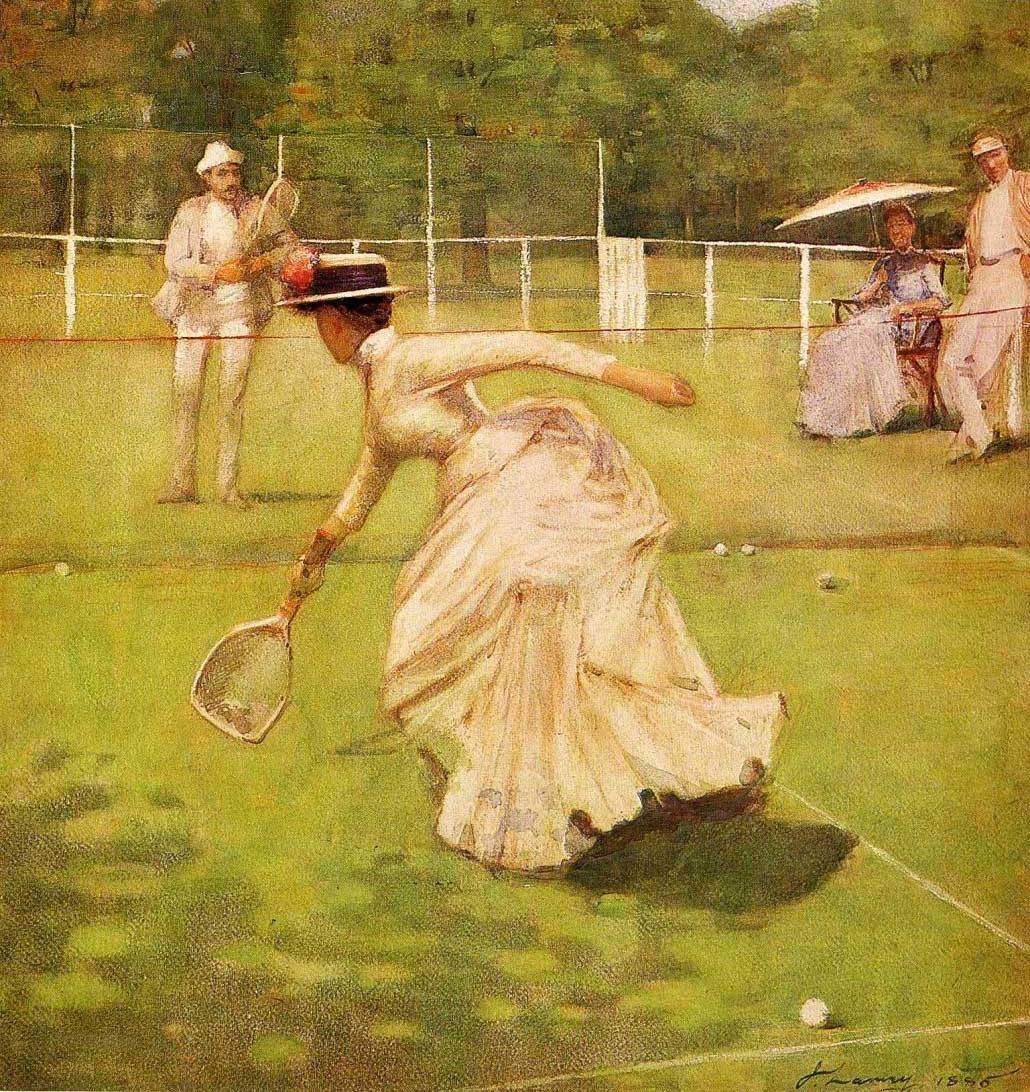
A Rally by Sir John Lavery. Badminton and tennis were popular occasions for parties, with women playing "mixed doubles" alongside male players.

=== Victorian women's fashion ===
The ideal Victorian woman was pure, chaste, refined, and modest. This ideal was supported by etiquette and manners. The etiquette extended to the pretension of never acknowledging the use of undergarments (sometimes generically referred to as "unmentionables"). The discussion of such a topic, it was feared, would gravitate towards unhealthy attention on anatomical details. As one Victorian lady expressed it: "[those] are not things, my dear, that we speak of; indeed, we try not even to think of them", in contrast to current norms. The pretence of avoiding acknowledgement of anatomical realities met with embarrassing failure on occasion. In 1859, the Hon. Eleanor Stanley wrote about an incident where the Duchess of Manchester moved too quickly while manoeuvring over a stile, tripping over her large hoop skirt:

[the Duchess] caught a hoop of her cage in it and went regularly head over heels lighting on her feet with her cage and whole petticoats above, above her head. They say there was never such a thing seen – and the other ladies hardly knew whether to be thankful or not that a part of her undergarments consisted in a pair of scarlet tartan knickerbockers (the things Charlie shoots in) which were revealed to the view of all the world in general and the Duc de Malakoff in particular".

However, despite the fact that Victorians considered the mention of women's undergarments in mixed company unacceptable, men's entertainment made great comedic material out of the topic of ladies' bloomers, including men's magazines and music hall skits.

Victorian women's clothing followed trends that emphasised elaborate dresses, skirts with wide volume created by the use of layered material such as crinolines, hoop skirt frames, and heavy fabrics. Because of the impracticality and health impact of the era's fashions, a dress reform movement began among women.

The ideal silhouette of the time demanded a narrow waist, which was accomplished by constricting the abdomen with a laced corset. While the silhouette was striking, and the dresses themselves were often exquisitely detailed creations, the fashions were cumbersome. At best, they restricted women's movements and at worst, they had a harmful effect on women's health. Physicians turned their attention to the use of corsets and determined that they caused several medical problems: compression of the thorax, restricted breathing, organ displacement, poor circulation, and prolapsed uterus.

Articles advocating the reform of women's clothing by the British National Health Society, the Ladies' Dress Association, and the Rational Dress Society were reprinted in The Canada Lancet, Canada's medical journal. In 1884, Dr J. Algernon Temple of Toronto even voiced concern that the fashions were having a negative impact on the health of young women from the working classes. He pointed out that a young working-class woman was likely to spend a large part of her earnings on fine hats and shawls, while "her feet are improperly protected, and she wears no flannel petticoat or woollen stockings".

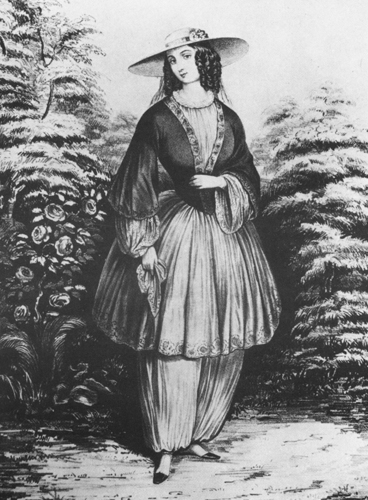
1850s illustration of a woman wearing bloomers

Florence Pomeroy, Lady Haberton, was president of the Rational Dress movement in Britain. At a National Health Society exhibition held in 1882, Viscountess Haliburton presented her invention of a "divided skirt", which was a long skirt that cleared the ground, with separate halves at the bottom made with material attached to the bottom of the skirt. She hoped that her invention would become popular by supporting women's freedom of physical movement, but the British public was not impressed by the invention, perhaps because of the negative "unwomanly" association of the style with the American Bloomers movement. Amelia Jenks Bloomer had encouraged the wearing of visible bloomers by feminists to assert their right to wear comfortable and practical clothing, but it was no more than a passing fashion itself among radical feminists. The movement to reform women's dress would persist and have long-term success, however; by the 1920s, Coco Chanel was successful at selling a progressive, far less restrictive silhouette that abandoned the corset and raised hemlines. The new silhouette symbolised modernism for trendy young women and became the 20th century standard. Other Paris designers continued reintroducing pants for women and the trend was gradually adopted over the next century.

Fashion trends, in one sense, travelled "full circle" over the course of the Victorian era. The popular women's styles during the Georgian era, and at the very beginning of Victoria's reign, emphasized a simple style influenced by flowing gowns worn by women in Ancient Greece and Rome. The Empire waist silhouette was replaced by a trend towards ornate styles and an artificial silhouette, with the restrictiveness of women's clothing reaching its low point during the mid-century passion for narrow corseted waists and hoop skirts. The iconic wide-brimmed women's hats of the later Victorian era also followed the trend towards ostentatious display. Hats began the Victorian era as simple bonnets. By the 1880s, milliners were tested by the competition among women to top their outfits with the most creative (and extravagant) hats, designed with expensive materials such as silk flowers and exotic plumes such as ostrich and peacock. As the Victorian era drew to a close, however, fashions were showing indications of a popular backlash against excessive styles. Model, actress and socialite Lillie Langtry took London by storm in the 1870s, attracting notice for wearing simple black dresses to social events. Combined with her natural beauty, the style appeared dramatic. Fashions followed her example (as well as Queen Victoria's wearing of mourning black later in her reign). According to Harold Koda, the former Curator-in-chief of the Metropolitan Museum of Art's Costume Institute, "The predominantly black palette of mourning dramatizes the evolution of period silhouettes and the increasing absorption of fashion ideals into this most codified of etiquettes," said Koda, "The veiled widow could elicit sympathy as well as predatory male advances. As a woman of sexual experience without marital constraints, she was often imagined as a potential threat to the social order."

==== Evolution of Victorian women's fashion ====
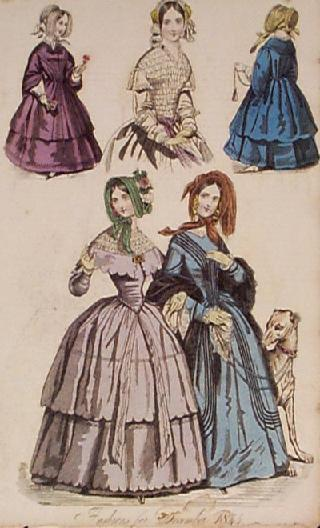
Ladies' December Fashions (1844). Hand-coloured steel engraving from a women's magazine.

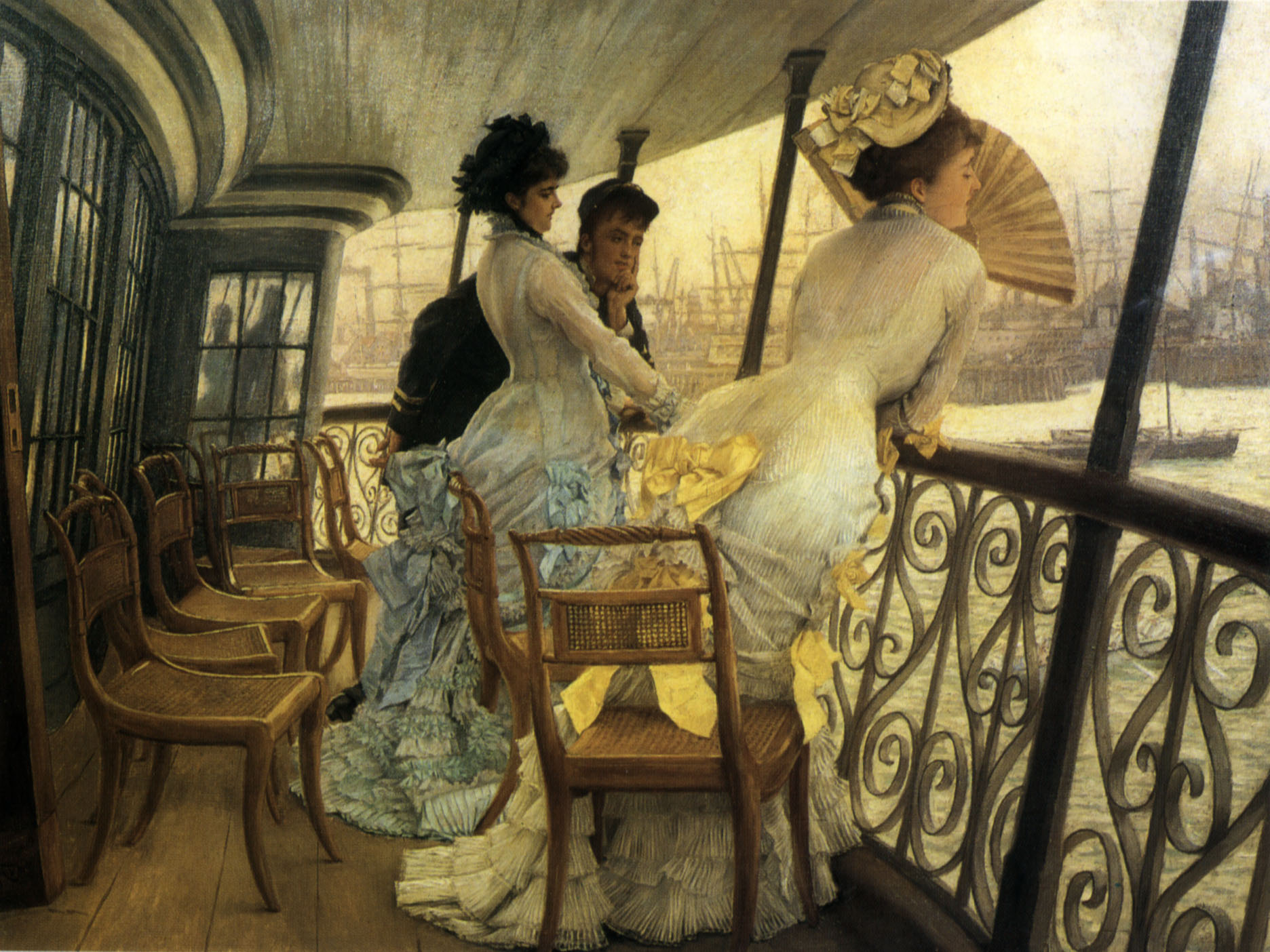
The Gallery of HMS Calcutta by James Tissot (1876). Bustles were fashionable in the 1870s and 1880s.

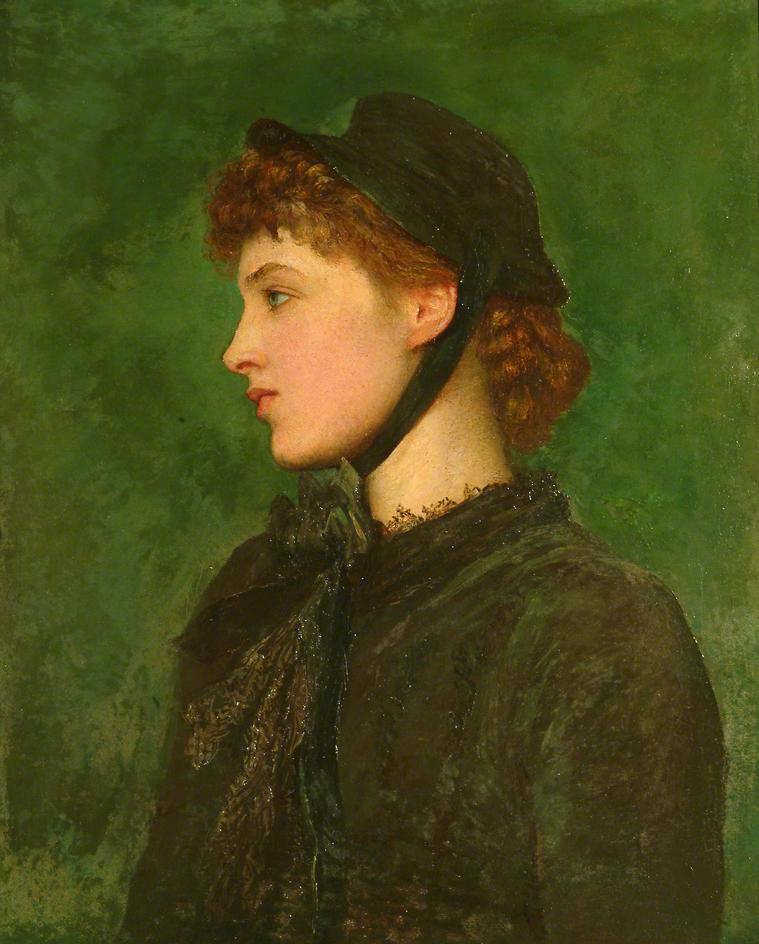
Mrs. Lillie Langtry by George Frederic Watts (1880).

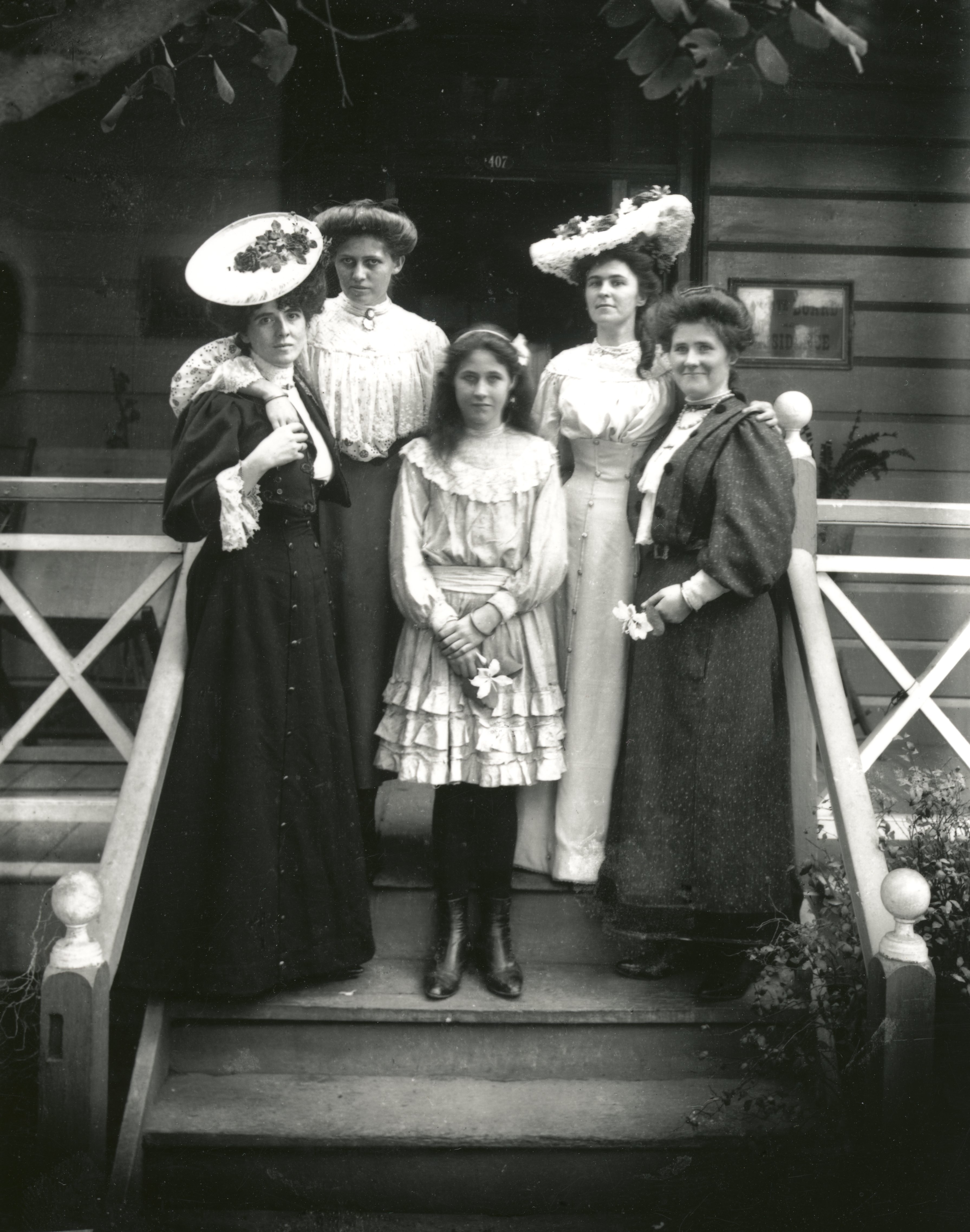
Fashionable women in Queensland, Australia around 1900.

== Women subjects of the British Empire ==
Queen Victoria reigned as the monarch of Britain's colonies and as Empress of India. The influence of British imperialism and British culture was powerful throughout the Victorian era. Women's roles in the colonial countries were determined by the expectations associated with loyalty to the Crown and the cultural standards that it symbolised.

=== Canada ===
The upper classes of Canada were almost without exception of British origin during the Victorian era. At the beginning of the Victorian era, British North America included several separate colonies that joined together as a Confederation in 1867 to create Canada under the British North America (BNA) Act, 1867. Military and government officials and their families came to British North America from England or Scotland, and less often were of Protestant Irish origin. Most business interests were controlled by Canadians who were of British stock. English-speaking minorities who immigrated to Canada struggled for economic and government influence, including large numbers of Roman Catholic Irish and later Ukrainians, Poles, and other European immigrants. French-Canadians remained largely culturally isolated from English-speaking Canadians (a situation later described in Two Solitudes by Hugh MacLennan). Visible minority groups, such as indigenous First Nations and Chinese labourers, were marginalised and suffered profound discrimination. Women's status was thus heavily dependent upon their ethnic identity as well as their place within the dominant British class structure.

English-speaking Canadian writers became popular, especially Catharine Parr Traill and her sister Susanna Moodie, middle-class English settlers who published memoirs of their lives as pioneers. Traill published The Backwoods of Canada (1836) and Canadian Crusoes (1852), and Moodie published Roughing it in the Bush (1852) and Life in the Clearings (1853).

Upper-class Canadian women emulated British culture and imported as much of it as possible across the Atlantic. Books, magazines, popular music, and theatre productions were all imported to meet women's consumer demand.

Upper-class women supported philanthropic causes similar to the educational and nursing charities championed by upper-class women in England. The Victorian Order of Nurses was founded in 1897 as a gift to Queen Victoria to commemorate her Diamond Jubilee. The Imperial Order Daughters of the Empire, founded in 1900, supports educational bursaries and book awards to promote Canadian patriotism, but also to support knowledge of the British Empire. Both organisations had Queen Victoria as their official patron. One of the patrons of Halifax's Victoria School of Art and Design (founded in 1887 and later named the Nova Scotia College of Art and Design) was Anna Leonowens. Women began making headway in their struggle to gain access to higher education: in 1875, the first woman university graduate in Canada was Grace Annie Lockhart (Mount Allison University). In 1880, Emily Stowe became the first woman licensed to practice medicine in Canada.

Women's legal rights made slow progress throughout the 19th century. In 1859, Upper Canada passed a law allowing married women to own property. In 1885, Alberta passed a law allowing unmarried women who owned property the right to vote and hold office in school matters.

Women's suffrage in Canada would not be achieved until the World War I period. Suffrage activism began during the later decades of the Victorian era. In 1883, the Toronto Women's Literary and Social Progress Club met and established the Canadian Women's Suffrage Association.

== See also ==
- Women's rights#18th and 19th century Europe
- The Edwardian Country House
- Women in early modern Scotland
