= Folk process =

Aspect of the study of folklore

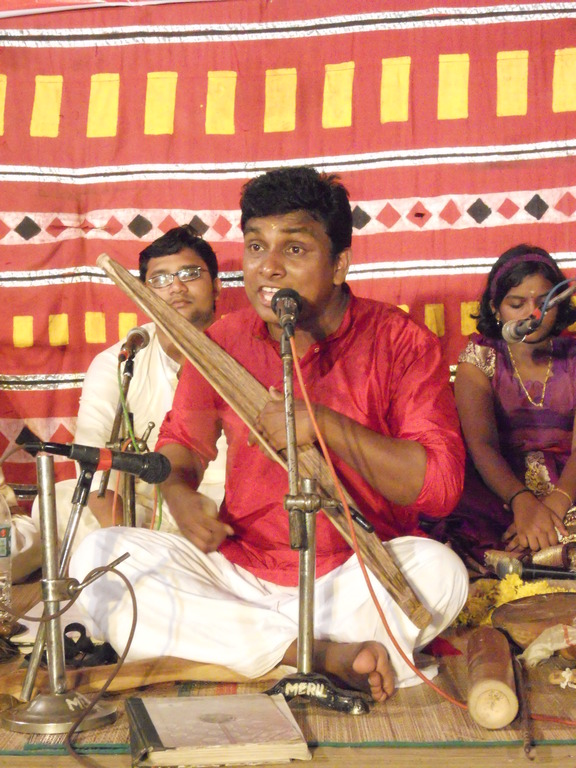
A singer accompanies himself with an onavillu, amplified with microphones. Traditional folk music is transmitted in performance; as such, it adapts to audience tastes and available technologies.

In the study of folklore, the folk process is the way folk material, especially stories, music, and other art, is transformed and re-adapted in the process of its transmission from person to person and from generation to generation. The folk process defines a community—the "folk community"—in and through which folklore is transmitted. While there is a place for professional and trained performers in a folk community, it is the act of refinement and creative change by community members within the folk tradition that defines the folk process.

== History ==
The phrase was originally coined by musicologist Charles Seeger, father of the folk singer Pete Seeger, but the underlying concept goes back to 1907, when Cecil Sharp observed that the transmission of folk songs and the forms they took when they were collected and attested was the result of three factors: continuity, variation, and selection. These factors were expanded on in 1954 by the International Folk Music Council, which wrote that:

Folk music is the product of a musical tradition that has been evolved through the process of oral transmission. The factors that shape the tradition are: (i) continuity which links the present with the past; (ii) variation which springs from the creative impulse of the individual or the group; and (iii) selection by the community, which determines the form or forms in which the music survives.

The term can be applied to music that has been evolved from rudimentary beginnings by a community uninfluenced by popular and art music and it can likewise be applied to music which has originated with an individual composer and has subsequently been absorbed into the unwritten living tradition of a community.

The term does not cover composed popular music that has been taken over ready-made by a community and remains unchanged, for it is the re-fashioning the re-creation of the music by the community that gives it its folk-character.

== Operation ==
The transformation and reinterpretation of received material is central to the folk process. The traditional Irish lament "Siúil A Rúin", with its macaronic mixed language Irish and English lyrics:

I wish I was on yonder hill
'Tis there I'd sit and cry my fill
And every tear would turn a mill
Is go dté tú mo mhuirnín slán

was reinterpreted in the nineteenth century United States and turned into the song "Johnny Has Gone for a Soldier" or "Buttermilk Hill", which has several variations, which preserve different parts of the original, as in a version collected by Walt Whitman:

I'll trace these gardens o'er and o'er,
Meditate on each sweet flower,
Thinking of each happy hour,
Oh, Johnny is gone for a soldier.

or another, anonymous variation:

Here I sit on Buttermilk Hill,
Who could blame me cry my fill?
And every tear would turn a mill.
Johnny has gone for a soldier.

Whitman's version preserved a line of Irish-derived doggerel ("Shool, shool, shool agrah"); the other version is entirely English.

The transformation of the material can be quite thorough. The Child ballad "Matty Groves", a murder ballad that begins with adultery and ends in a duel and the death of the title protagonist, becomes the American love song "Shady Grove". The basic tune is often kept intact, sometimes transposed to a major key from the original minor, but the narrative of the original song is no longer found in the American version.

== Mass culture and the folk process ==
Through the folk process, the subjects of folk song and narrative are adapted to better suit the times; lyrics can be added, or removed; parts that are no longer understood can be re-interpreted or discarded. The result is a new bit of folklore that the next generation will continue to preserve in its new form. The folk process started to become problematic, first, when it began to operate on the copyrighted and commercial products of mass culture, and the appropriation and commercialization by mass culture of folk narrative and music which, being distributed by the mass media, become the newly canonical versions of the tradition.

One famous example of the conflict between the desire of artists to assert copyright and the folk tradition is the case of the ballad "Scarborough Fair". "Scarborough Fair" is a traditional British folk song with many variations, which was reworked by Simon and Garfunkel for their 1966 album Parsley, Sage, Rosemary and Thyme; however, unlike the artists of previous generations, Simon and Garfunkel asserted sole authorship of the song.

The Internet and digital media, enabling consumers of culture to copy, alter, and select bits of both folk and mass culture, has tended to accelerate the folk process.

The transformation of mass culture by the folk process goes back to the origins of mass culture; many old and traditional poems and ballads are preserved among the printed broadside ballads. Professionally composed music, such as the parlor ballad "Lorena" by H. D. L. Webster, were transmitted by performance and became subject to the folk process. Folk and mass culture can cross-pollinate each other; a nineteenth-century broadside, "The Unfortunate Lad", became the American cowboy standard "Streets of Laredo", the jazz standard "St. James Infirmary Blues", and strongly influenced the Marty Robbins hit "El Paso".

== See also ==
- Fan art
- Folklore
- Folkloristics
- Oral tradition
- "We Shall Overcome"
