= William Bromfield (disambiguation) =

William Bromfield (1868–1950) was an English trade unionist and politician.

William Bromfield may also refer to:

- William Bromfeild (1712–1792), English surgeon
- William Arnold Bromfield (1801–1851), English botanist
