= London Lock Hospital =

Voluntary venereal disease hospital

Coordinates: 51.5002°N 0.1495°W

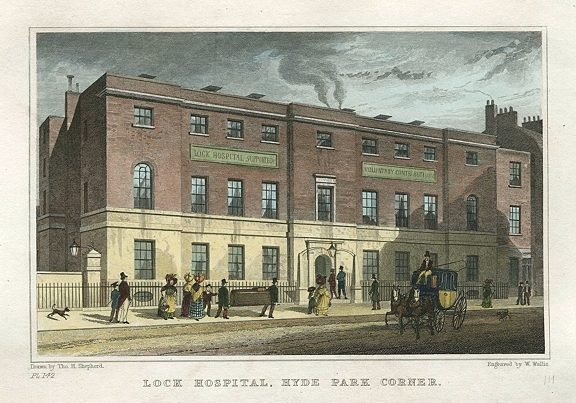
- London Lock Hospital

Geography
- Location: London, United Kingdom

Organisation
- Care system: NHS England (from 1948)
- Type: Specialist

Services
- Speciality: Venereal disease, Maternity and gynaecology

History
- Founded: 1747
- Closed: 1952

Links
- Lists: Hospitals in the United Kingdom

The London Lock Hospital was the first voluntary hospital for venereal disease. It was also the most famous and first of the Lock Hospitals which were developed for the treatment of syphilis following the end of the use of lazar hospitals, as leprosy declined. The hospital later developed maternity and gynaecology services before being incorporated into the National Health Service in 1948 and closing in 1952.

== History ==
The hospital was founded by William Bromfeild at Grosvenor Place in London as a hospital for the treatment of venereal disease and opened on 31 January 1747.

The religious commentator, Thomas Scott, who published a Commentary on the Whole Bible and who became the founding Secretary of the Church Missionary Society, founded the Lock Asylum for the Reception of Penitent Female Patients in 1787 as a refuge for women who had been treated at the hospital. The Lock Asylum opened in Osnaburg Row in 1792 and moved, first to Knightsbridge in 1812, then to Lower Eaton Street in 1816 and finally co-located with the Lock Hospital in 1849.

Meanwhile, the Lock Hospital had moved to 283 Harrow Road in Westbourne Grove in 1842. It was renamed the Female Hospital when a new site in Dean Street, Soho, opened for male outpatients in 1862. It was expanded as a result of the Contagious Diseases Prevention Act 1864 in 1867.

The Lock Asylum, which had continued to occupy a wing in the Female Hospital, became known as the 'Rescue Home' in 1893. The whole facility (the Female Hospital and the Lock Asylum) became known as the London Lock Hospital and Rescue Home at that time.

A maternity unit opened in 1917, followed by an ophthalmology unit and a genitourinary unit that treated venereal and non-venereal gynaecological disorders. A new maternity centre opened at 283A Harrow Road in 1938. During the Second World War the facility was used as a Military Isolation Hospital. It joined the National Health Service in 1948 when it became an outpatients department for Paddington Hospital. After it closed in 1952, the hospital was demolished and the site is now occupied by flats.

== History of the name ==
The Oxford English Dictionary states that the single word term 'lock' was used to describe a leper hospital in Southwark, where lepers were isolated and treated. The sources for this usage go back to 1359. A 1375 source states that the foreman, William Cook, was sworn to prevent lepers from entering the City of London. The same source asserts that eventually the term 'lock' came to be used attributively, as in 'lock hospital'.

The memory of the London Lock Hospital continues with the London Lock Hospital Memorial Prize in Sexually Transmitted Diseases at the Royal Free Hospital School of Medicine, which was established by bequest in 1965 by an old student and staff member of the school. With subsequent mergers of London medical schools, it is now part of the awards in communicable diseases for final-year medical students at the UCL Medical School.

== Traditional folk song ==
The Lock Hospital is just one of the many alternative titles for a popular traditional British folk song, "The Unfortunate Lad", a warning against venereal disease, dating from the late 18th century. The hospital is mentioned by name in the first verse:

As I was walking down by the Lock Hospital,
As I was walking one morning of late,
Who did I spy but my own dear comrade,
Wrapped in flannel, so hard is his fate.

Subsequent lines mention the "salts and pills of white mercury" that might have saved the unfortunate youth's life if only his lover had warned him in time. There are many variants of the song (such as "St. James Infirmary Blues", "Streets of Laredo", "The Trooper Cut Down in His Prime", etc.) in which the personae are variously a gambler, cowboy, soldier, sailor, or even a young girl, "cut down in their prime".

== See also ==
- Healthcare in London
- List of hospitals in England
