= William Bromfeild =

English surgeon

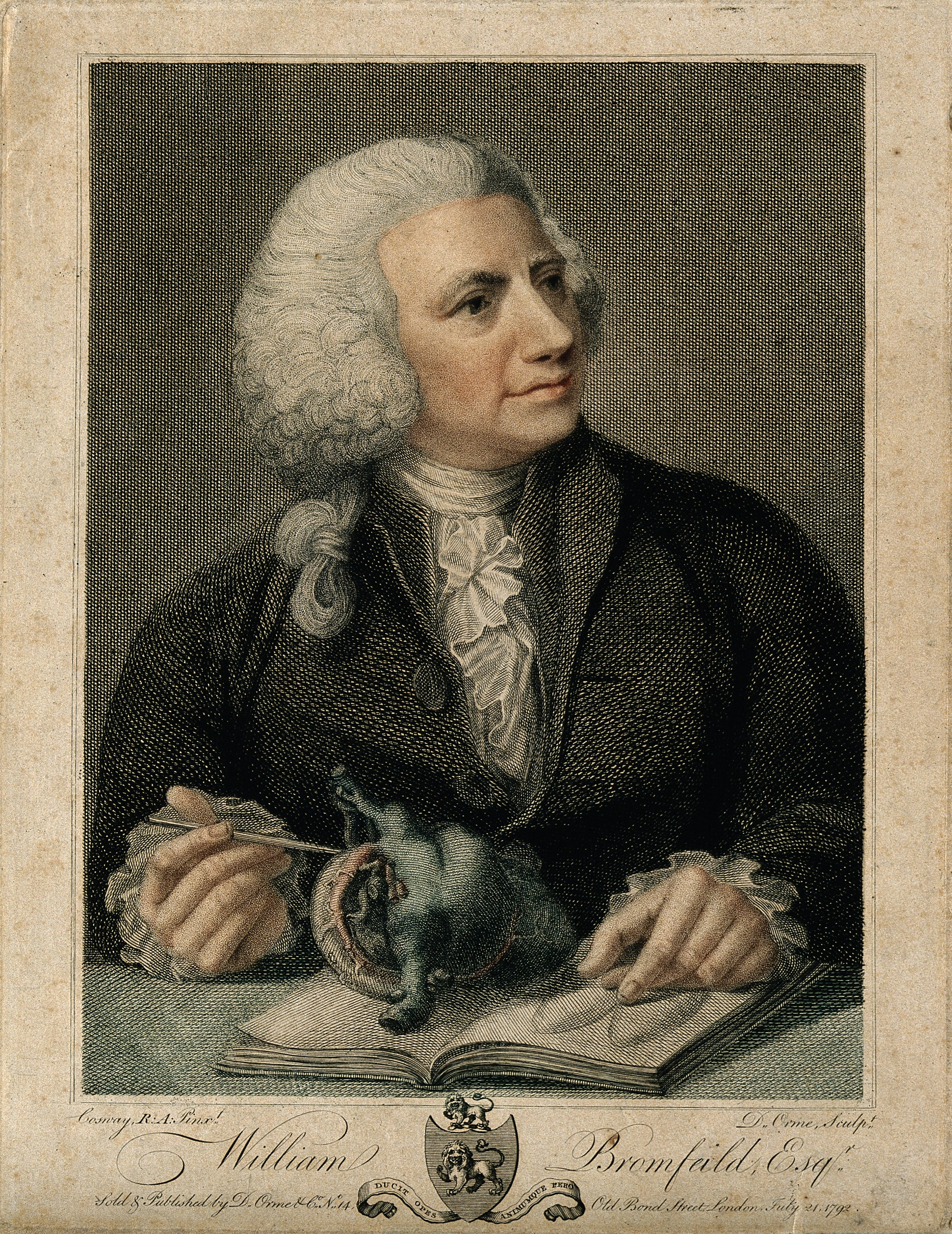
Portrait

William Bromfeild (often, incorrectly, Bromfield) (1712–1792) was an English surgeon.

== Life ==
Bromfeild was born in London in 1712, and, after some years' instruction under a surgeon, began at an early period to practise on his own account. In 1741 he began a course of lectures on anatomy and surgery which attracted a large attendance of pupils. Some years afterwards he formed with Martin Madan the plan of the London Lock Hospital for the treatment of venereal disease, to which he was appointed surgeon. For a theatrical performance in aid of its funds he altered an old comedy, the City Match, written in 1639 by Jaspar Maine, which in 1755 was acted at Drury Lane. He was also elected one of the surgeons of St George's Hospital.

In 1761 he was appointed one of the suite to attend the Princess of Mecklenburg on her journey to England to be wedded to George III, and after the marriage he was appointed surgeon to her majesty's household.

In his later years he retired from his profession, and resided in a house which he had built for himself in Chelsea Park. He died on 24 November 1792.

== Works ==
Besides contributing some papers to the Transactions of the Royal Society, he was the author of:

- 'Syllabus anatomicus generalem humani corporis partium ideam comprehendens,' 1743.
- 'An Account of English Nightshades,' 1757.
- 'Narrative of a Physical Transaction with Mr. Aylet, surgeon at Windsor,' 1759.
- 'Thoughts concerning the present peculiar Method of treating persons inoculated for the Small-pox,' 1767.
- 'Chirurgical Cases and Observations,' vol. 1, 1773.
- 'Chirurgical Cases and Observations,' vol. 2, 1773.
