= The Unfortunate Lad =

Anglo-American folk ballad

"The Unfortunate Lad" is the correct title of a song printed without a tune on a number of 19th century ballad sheets by Such of London and Carrots and possibly others.

It is number 2 in the Roud Folk Song Index, and it is Laws number Q26.

Sometimes incorrectly termed The Unfortunate Rake, it is believed to be the ancestor of many variants collected in England and elsewhere, as well as of the American songs The Cowboy’s Lament, Streets of Laredo, and, more controversially, St James’ Infirmary.

It is seen as "one of the most versatile songs in the Anglo-American tradition, as it seems able to adapt itself to any group or situation." Telling of someone dying or actually dead, it has been sung about a soldier, a young sailor, a cowboy, a lumberman, or just a young man or girl. In all cases a military-style funeral is called for. Some versions, including Herbert Prince's version given in the "New English Book of Folk Songs" are clear that the "hero" is dying of a venereal disease; some provide what Bishop and Roud call "explicit clues" such as "treatment with mercury"; others use euphemisms "such as being 'disordered' by a partner; yet others leave the cause of the illness unspecified.

Folklorists have sometimes seen this as a good example of the way a song evolves. For example, Lodewick commented that the “story” connecting variants "...provides a good example of environmental changes that take place in a song.”

In the 2018 Katharine Briggs Memorial Lecture, Professor Richard Jenkins discusses several aspects of what he calls the "folkloristic narrative" relating to these songs. He asserts that several aspects of this narrative may be shown to be "dubious, if not incorrect", and suggests that the way in which a "misleading tale" became accepted as "conventional knowledge" has implications for those engaged in the study of folklore.

== Lyrics ==
As the folkloric narrative relating to this song often refers to the 19th century printing by Such, that version is given here in full, though, as Jenkins (2019) states, various firms printed it.

The Unfortunate Lad (Version Printed by H Such)

As I was a walking down by the Lock Hospital,
As I was walking one morning of late,
Who did I spy but my own dear comrade
Wrapp'd up in flannel, so hard was his fate.

Chorus
Had she but told me when she disordered me,
Had she but told me of it in time,
I might have got salts and pills of white mercury
But now I'm cut down in the height of my prime.

I boldly stepped up to him, and kindly did ask him,
Why he was wrapped up in flannel so white?
My body is injured and sadly disordered,
All by a young woman, my own heart's delight.

My father oft told me, and oftentimes chided me,
And said my wicked ways would never do,
But I never minded him, nor ever heeded him,
I always kept up my wicked ways.

Get six jolly fellows to carry my coffin,
And six pretty maidens to bear up my pall,
And give to each of them bunches of roses,
That they may not smell me as they go along.

Over my coffin put handfuls of lavender,
Handfuls of lavender on every side,
Bunches of roses all over my coffin,
Saying, there goes a young man cut down in his prime.

Muffle your drums, play your pipes merrily,
Play the dead march as you go along,
And fire your guns over my coffin,
There goes an unfortunate lad to his home

A very slightly different version, also set "by the Lock Hospital", was printed by John Carrots of Durham.

The Carrots version has no 'chorus' indicated. The stanza beginning 'Had she but told me' appears as the fourth, not the second/chorus as in the Such version. The last line of the third stanza is :"Always kept up in my own wicked views."

== Origins and earlier versions ==
Bishop and Roud comment as follows:

The origins of the song are unclear. "An undated broadside in the Madden collection called 'The Buck's Elegy' is clearly the earliest, and appears to date from between 1790 and 1810"

P.W. Joyce (1909) published a single verse collected from a man who had heard it sung in Cork in about 1790. "The song is probably at least half a century older than this, but at present we have no evidence to support such a theory"

== Variants ==
Lists of variants appear both online and in the literature on the song. One source of documentation is the Vaughan Williams Memorial Library at the English Folk Dance and Song Society. The Broadside Index and the Folk Song Index are both compiled by Steve Roud and are searchable online.

== Tunes ==
A number of different variants use the same melody, including the sub-family known as "The Cowboy's Lament", of which "Streets of Laredo" is perhaps currently the best known. This tune is also used for a different song, "The Bard of Armagh".

The nineteenth century broadsheet versions from the British Isles were printed without tunes.

In 1904, it was conjectured that words of the song "The Unfortunate Lad" had originally been sung to an Irish tune called "The Unfortunate Rake", which had been printed with different words, or no words, in two collections of Irish tunes, one by Crosby, the other by Belden. For example, the words provided for the air "The Unfortunate Rake" by Crosby are about a wandering harpist from Connaught, who is seeking pity and hospitality from his listeners. To complicate matters, more than one air has been known as 'The Unfortunate Rake'. Jenkins has stated that there is "a musicological discussion to be had" about the various tunes with that name and about their relationships to the tunes of the songs linked to The Unfortunate Lad.

Tunes Collected in England

English folk song collectors in the early twentieth century found different tunes being used for variants.

The melody for a variant called "The Unfortunate Lad", set in Rippleton Gardens, was published in 1904.

Another melody, this time to a variant called "The Young Girl Cut Down in Her Prime", was collected in 1909 and published in 1913. The tune is noted as "mixolydian with dorian influence". In a note to this article, Cecil Sharp reported that he had collected six different tunes for this song, and he published the ones he stated were the "two best tunes - both of the Henry Martin type". The first is labelled "dorian", the second "aeolian/dorian".

In 1915, yet another tune was published in the Journal of the Folk Song Society; this time stated to be similar to one used for rush-cart Morris dancing at Moston, near Manchester, England.

In 1918, English folk song collector Cecil Sharp, who was visiting the US, collected a version which used the phrase "St James' Hospital" in Dewey, Virginia. This song was called "The Sailor Cut Down in His Prime". Sharp's field notes were available for researchers, though the song was not published until after Sharp's death, when his collaborator, Maud Karpeles, produced a second volume of songs from the Southern Appalachians.

By 1937, the English Folk Song Society had become the English Folk Dance and Song Society, and in that year, another tune was published, this time to accompany a variant beginning with a reference to "Bath Hospital". The tune is described as "dorian".

== Treatment in folkloric literature ==
Introductory Summary

In the early 20th century, the American folklorist Phillips Barry published two articles that alluded to the Such printing, but incorrectly gave the title as "The Unfortunate Rake". In the first he wrote: "... very few Irish songs have become Americanized, - due doubtless to the exile's love of his native country. Two, however, are notable exceptions. Of these, one, a song of the camp, entitled " The Unfortunate Rake," is in its original form, as found on Such broadsides, too vulgar to reprint here." Phillips quoted the last verse of a song published by Such and quoted above, which was actually entitled "The Unfortunate Lad".

This title and the assertion about its existence as a Such broadside was taken up and repeated, to the extent that a folkloristic narrative about groups of songs believed to be descended from ‘The Unfortunate Rake’ became received wisdom and can be found repeated many times on the internet and in paper publications. Yet it is "almost certainly wrong" and the use of that title is "... most likely an egregious mistake, a cumulative compounding of the original error."' The claim about an Irish origin is also dubious at best.

In the 1940s and 50s, English journalist, folk enthusiast and recording artist A L Lloyd published an article believed to be the first to link The Unfortunate Lad/Rake with the blues song St James' Infirmary. Some years later he published a revised article putting forward broadly the same view.

An album called English Street Songs featured Lloyd singing a song called 'The Unfortunate Rake, with a first line referring to St James' Hospital.

The 1960s album ‘The Unfortunate Rake’, which anthologised a collection of supposedly related songs, was produced by Kenneth Goldstein, who wrote liner notes to accompany it. This recording played an important part in bringing the genealogical story and the incorrect title to a wider audience.

“By the end of this long, and sometimes indirect, conversation between folk music scholars and collectors, a musical genealogy was in place and widely accepted… A ‘song of the camp’ known generically as ‘The Unfortunate Rake’, apparently of eighteenth century Irish provenance (if not actual origin), evolved into a host of other British variants, and travelled across the Atlantic, eventually to give rise to ‘The Streets of Laredo’ and, perhaps more distantly, ‘St. James Infirmary’”

Some voices have been raised in objection to the claim that St James' Infirmary Blues is a direct descendent, notably that of Robert Harwood.
