= Agnes Dunbar Moodie Fitzgibbon =

Canadian artist

Agnes Dunbar Moodie Fitzgibbon Chamberlin
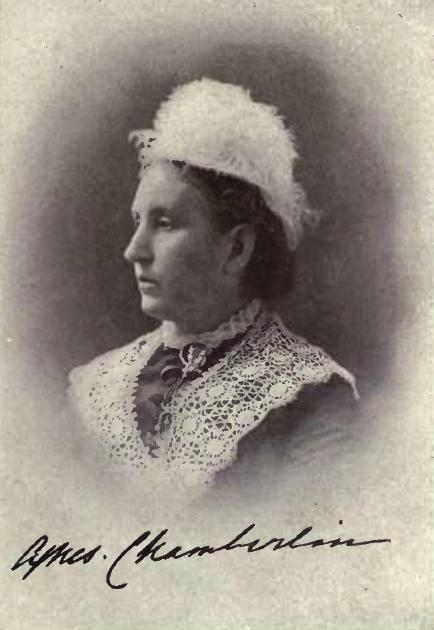
- Born: Agnes Dunbar Moodie; 1833; Cobourg, Upper Canada
- Died: 1913 (aged 79–80); Toronto, Ontario, Canada
- Occupation: Artist

Agnes Dunbar Fitzgibbon Chamberlin (née Moodie; 1833–1913) was a Canadian artist living in Ontario.

== Biography ==
She was born Agnes Dunbar Moodie on a farm near Cobourg, Upper Canada. Her parents were John and Susanna Moodie. Around five years later, the family moved to Belleville.

She learned how to paint flowers from her mother. Her mother, famously, published Roughing it in the Bush, a romantic history about the harshness of Canadian rural living during the 1830s. Roughing it was published in 1852.

In 1868, Canadian Wild Flowers was published, viewed as one of the first serious botanical works published in Canada, which included text by Catharine Parr Traill. The book, very expensive for its time, was sold by subscription, largely through its author's own efforts; as an enterprising widow, she also worked as an illustrator to support her children and herself.

== Marriages ==
Fitzgibbon was married twice: first around 1850 to Charles Thomas Fitzgibbon, a barrister, who died in 1865, and, in 1870, to Brown Chamberlin, later the Queen's Printer. She had eight children with her first husband and one with her second.

== Works ==
In 1863, she began her paintings of Canadian flora to illustrate a book by her aunt, Catharine Parr Traill. After the death of her husband, she began work on a book of Canadian wild flowers, with her water-coloured illustrations and Traill's text. The book attracted 500 subscriptions, a significant number at the time.

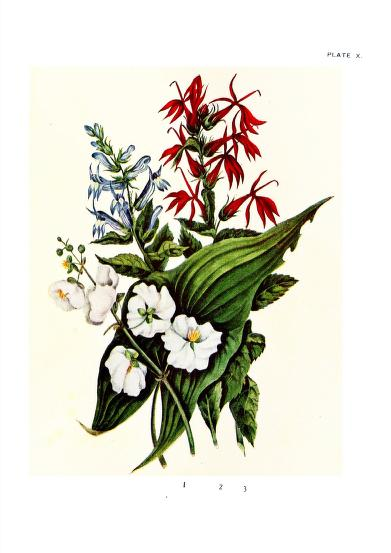
Illustration of Canadian Wildflowers by Agnes Chamberlin

Canadian Wild Flowers first edition was published in 1868; the second and third subscribed editions were published in 1869 (Montreal: J. Lovell); and a fourth edition in 1895 (Toronto: W. Briggs).

Her paintings of Canadian plants and flowers were also published in other books on Canadian flora, with 9 full page colour lithographs in Catherine Traill's Studies of Plant Life in Canada (Ottawa: A.S. Woodburn, 1885).

In 1972, 11 of the watercolour paintings were reproduced in Eustella Langdon's Pioneer Gardens (Toronto: Holt Rinehart and Winston).

== Death ==
She died in Toronto in 1913. Her heirs presented her paintings and copies of Canadian Wild Flowers and Studies of Plant Life in Canada to the University of Toronto in 1934–5. They became part of the University's Botany Department,

Then, in 1966, the collection of books and paintings were transferred to the Rare Books and Special Collections of the University of Toronto Library in 1966. These books and artwork are now available in the Chamberlin Collection of the University of Toronto and digitized to view online.

== Early exhibitions ==
Her paintings have been presented at exhibitions in Canada, USA, and England since 1886.

- 1886 – Exhibition of paintings by Agnes Chamberlin and her daughter, Geraldine Moodie, at the Colonial Exhibition, London, England.
- 1875 – Agnes Chamberlin's artwork was also shown by the "Dominion Government" at the Philadelphia Centennial Exhibition.
- ca.1907 – Exhibition of Chamberlin's watercolours at the Women's Canadian Historical Society of Toronto in the East Hall of University College, University of Toronto.
- 1937 – Exhibition of Chamberlin's paintings at the Botany Building for the Biological Club's Conversazione.
- 1967 – Exhibition of Chamberlin's watercolours at the Sigmund Samuel Library.
- 1976 – Thomas Fisher Rare Book Library, July–August
- 1977 Royal Ontario Museum, Toronto
  The exhibition held at the ROM's Canadiana Gallery, "Two Gentlewomen of Upper Canada", June 15 to September 18, 1977 featured watercolours and drawings by Agnes Chamberlin and Anne Langton.
