= Reydon =

Village in Suffolk, England

Coordinates: 52.3376°N 1.6695°E

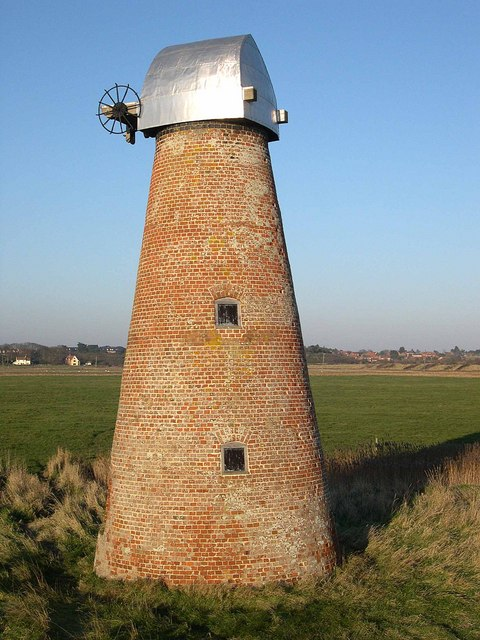
- Blackshore Mill

- Location within Suffolk
- Population: 2,582 (2011)
- OS grid reference: TM499774
- Civil parish: Reydon
- District: East Suffolk
- Shire county: Suffolk
- Region: East
- Country: England
- Sovereign state: United Kingdom
- Post town: SOUTHWOLD
- Postcode district: IP18
- Dialling code: 01502
- Police: Suffolk
- Fire: Suffolk
- Ambulance: East of England
- UK Parliament: Suffolk Coastal

Reydon is a village and civil parish, 1.0 mile (1.6 km) north-west of Southwold and 2.5 miles (4.0 km) south-east of Wangford, in the East Suffolk district and the ceremonial county of Suffolk, England. Its population of 2,567 in 2001 including Easton Bavents eased up to 2,582 at the 2011 Census, and was estimated at 2,772 in 2018. The name probably means Rye Hill, Rey meaning rye and -don being an old word for hill or rise. The village is close to the cliffs at Easton Bavents, a village now much eroded. Both were established before neighbouring Southwold. The parish church is St Margaret of Antioch. The parish of Easton Bavents was merged with Reydon in 1987, when part of Southwold was also transferred.

== Communications and services ==
There are three main roads through Reydon, around which the village is built: A1095 Halesworth heading west to Blythburgh and Halesworth, B1126 Wangford heading north-west through Reydon to Wangford, and B1127 Lowestoft heading north-east to Wrentham and Lowestoft. The village of Reydon lies to the north of the town of Southwold. The three main roads converge at Reydon Corner, about 100 metres from Mights Bridge across Buss Creek, which provides the only road entry to Southwold.

Reydon has two shops. Local opposition could not prevent the sub-post office from closing on 11 February 2008, but the associated shop continues. It also has a pub/hotel with restaurant, The Randolph Hotel, in Wangford Road. It was renamed "The Cricketers", due to the adjacent locality of Southwold's former Eversley School cricket ground and playing fields, but reverted to its original name. The cricket ground was sold for housing and has now been built upon.

Further along is a group of new houses on the site of a former senior school, Reydon Modern, renamed Reydon High after converting into a comprehensive in 1978, but closed in 1990.

Continuing towards Wangford, there is St Margaret's Church (see below), then Reydon Hall, at one time the home of the writers Elizabeth Strickland, Agnes Strickland, Jane Margaret, Catharine Parr, Susanna Moodie and Samuel Strickland.

Reydon Wood is popular with walkers, especially when carpeted with bluebells in the spring. There is sheltered accommodation in Lowestoft Road.

== Education ==
Reydon Primary School caters for 200 children aged three to eleven, from the village and surrounding area. At age 11, most pupils moved on to Sir John Leman High School in Beccles, with some choosing to attend Bungay High School. However, after a 2019 decision by Suffolk County Council on eligibility for free school transport, the default 11–16 secondary school for Reydon students is now Pakefield High School in Lowestoft.

Up to 1990, secondary education was provided by Reydon High School. After its closure in that year, students were then bussed to other schools in the area, and the land sold for housing development. The school playing fields are still in use, with the original school canteen building being used for changing rooms. Plans to extend the fields have been adopted by Waveney District Council.

Saint Felix School on the Halesworth Road is independent. Founded as a girls' public school in 1897, it now takes pupils of both sexes aged 1–18. The independent St George's School on the same site closed in 2004.

== Development and building ==
Reydon has seen much new housing construction recently, due mainly to rising house prices in Southwold and the popularity of Reydon itself as a retirement village. Housing replaced the former Eversley School playing field to the south of the Randolph Hotel, and further construction is planned on other vacant plots throughout the village, and on adjacent farmland. According to figures in the 2011 Census, Reydon's permanent population has risen to more than double that of Southwold.

The spread of new homes has lost Reydon much of its village atmosphere. Additionally, rising house prices in Southwold have led to several properties in Reydon being purchased as second homes, often unoccupied for long periods. However, this is unlikely to affect the increase in permanent population, at least in the short term.

In 2004, a 4400 m^{2} distribution centre for Adnams Brewery was constructed on the western edge of Reydon on the site of an old open-cast sand quarry.

== The Church of St Margaret ==
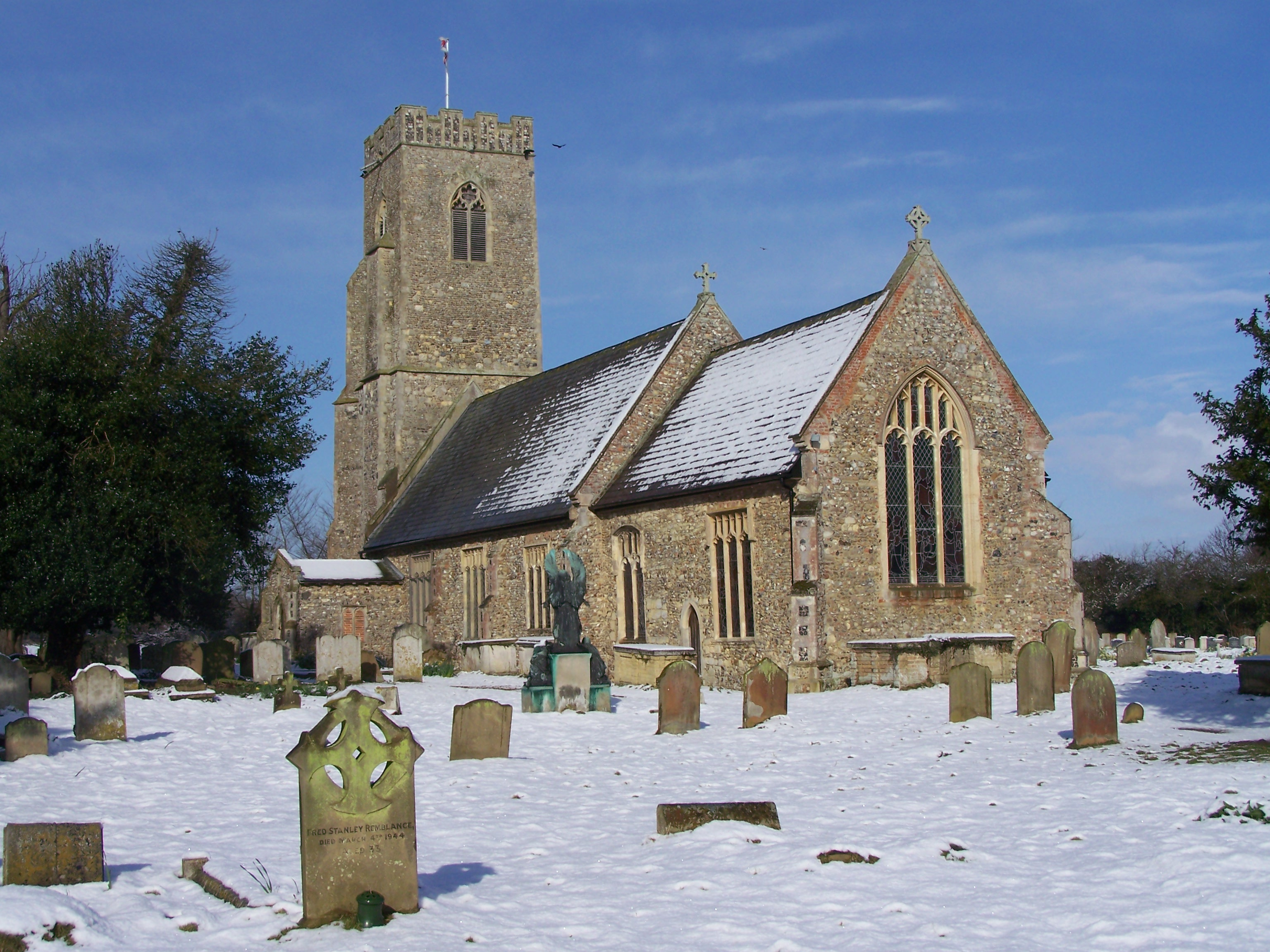
St Margaret's Church, Reydon in the snow

The parish church, dedicated to St Margaret of Antioch, stands in Wangford Road, to the north-west of the village. One of its striking features is a large, unnamed bronze angel inscribed "To Fanny my beloved wife". The present building is mainly from the early 14th century. The tower was built about 1325. The chancel was restyled in the 15th century, and has many niches for saints in the window splays. The church suffered damage during the Reformation and the Civil War and was much altered in succeeding centuries.

More drastic was the restoration and re-roofing of 1875–1887, which robbed the church of most of its old furnishings and architectural detail. The replacement roof is of a plain, simple design. The royal arms displayed are those of Queen Anne and date from 1713. In 1988 a large extension was built onto the north side of the nave using the original north door, which was reopened when the organ was moved into the chancel to allow for the building. The building is the frequently-used parish room. The rood loft stairs are open but partly bricked up at the top.

The Victorian organ is in the chancel, for want of space in the nave, but it clutters the space and distracts attention from some Victorian stained glass. Behind the organ is a blocked entrance, also apparent from the outside. The small chapel to which it led has vanished. The font, of no great age, stands at the base of the tower, having been moved there from the nave in 1988 to improve access to a new parish room. The font cover, donated in 1922, was once suspended from the ceiling in the nave and operated by a system of weights; the wood in the roof still shows this.

In 1999, the parish of Reydon became part of the Sole Bay Team Ministry.

=== The church bells ===
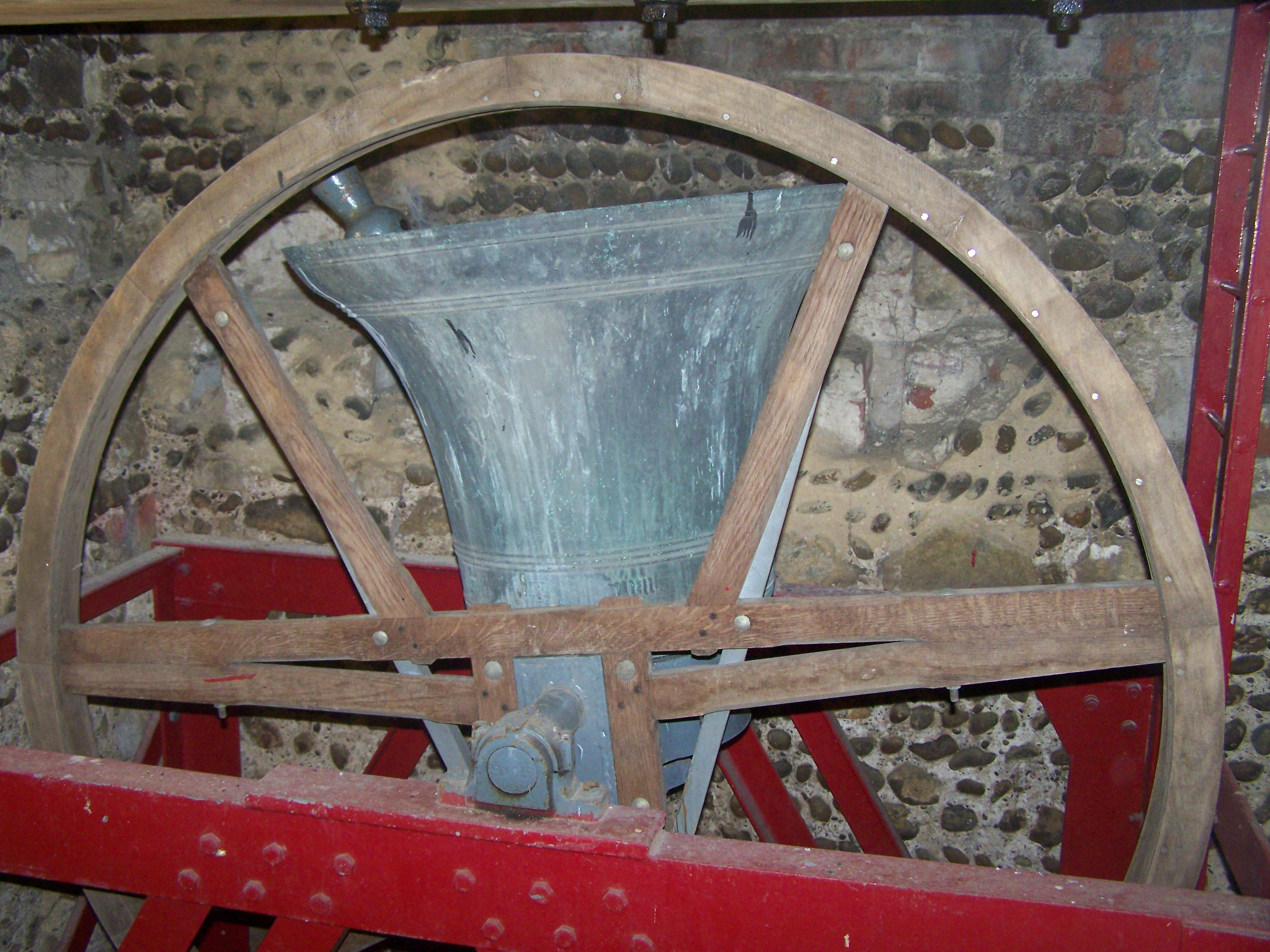
'Gabriel' in the 'up' position, set ready for ringing

The tower originally held three bells, two of which were sold in 1792 to fund repairs to the church. In 1991 an appeal was launched to restore the tower, replace the two missing bells and procure a further three. These were dedicated at a service in December 1996. The original 15th-century bell, "Gabriel", has been joined by "Michael", "Raphael", "Peter", "Mary" and "Seraph", all cast at the Whitechapel Bell Foundry in 1995 and 1996. The tenor (the largest) weighs 517 kg and the treble (the smallest) about a third of that. The bells hang in a two-tier steel frame, installed in 1995. The bells are hung for the traditional English art of change ringing. Ringing takes place from ground level with the font in the centre of the rope circle. The tower is affiliated to the Suffolk Guild of Ringers. The bells are rung regularly for practice, Sunday services, weddings and other special occasions.

== Notable residents ==
In birth order:

- John Youngs (c. 1598–1672), cleric and founder of Southold, New York, was born in Reydon.
- Agnes Strickland (1796–1874), historical writer and poet, lived at Reydon Hall.
- Susanna Moodie, née Strickland (1803–1885), Canadian author and younger sister of Agnes, lived at Reydon Hall.
- Alexander Hyatt King (1911–1995), musicologist, lived in Southwold and is buried in Reydon churchyard.
- Lewis Blake (born 1946), poet
- Geoffrey Munn OBE, MVO (born 1953), presenter on the BBC Antiques Roadshow, local historian, and author of Southwold – an Earthly Paradise
- Bernard Hill (1944–2024), actor best known for his performances in Boys from the Blackstuff and The Lord of the Rings: The Return of the King died in Reydon in May 2024.
