= Mackenzie Bowell =

Prime Minister of Canada from 1894 to 1896

The Honourable Sir Mackenzie Bowell PC KCMG
- Prime Minister Bowell in 1895.

5th Prime Minister of Canada
- In office December 21, 1894 – April 27, 1896
- Monarch: Victoria
- Governor General: The Earl of Aberdeen
- Preceded by: John Thompson
- Succeeded by: Charles Tupper

Canadian Senator from Ontario
- In office December 1892 – December 10, 1917
- Appointed by: John Sparrow David Thompson

Member of Parliament for Hastings North
- In office September 20, 1867 – December 1892
- Preceded by: Riding established
- Succeeded by: Alexander Augustus Williamson Carscallen

Personal details
- Born: December 27, 1823 Rickinghall, Suffolk, England
- Died: December 10, 1917 (aged 93) Belleville, Ontario, Canada
- Resting place: Belleville Cemetery, Belleville, Ontario, Canada
- Party: Conservative
- Spouse: Harriet Bowell (m. 1847; died 1884)
- Children: 9
- Awards: Order of St Michael and St George; Canadian General Service Medal; Colonial Auxiliary Forces Officers' Decoration

Military service
- Allegiance: Province of Canada; Dominion of Canada
- Branch/service: Canadian militia (1861-1872)
- Years of service: 1861–1872
- Rank: Lieutenant-Colonel
- Unit: Belleville Volunteer Militia Rifle Company; The Argyll Light Infantry; 49th Hastings Battalion
- Battles/wars: Fenian Raids

Sir Mackenzie Bowell (/ˈboʊ.əl/; December 27, 1823 – December 10, 1917) was the fifth prime minister of Canada, serving from 1894 to 1896.

Bowell was born in Rickinghall, Suffolk, England. He and his family moved to Belleville, Upper Canada in 1832. When in his early teens, Bowell was apprenticed to the printing shop of the local newspaper, the Belleville Intelligencer, and some 15 years later, became its owner and proprietor.

In 1867, following Confederation, he was elected to the House of Commons for the Conservative Party. Bowell entered cabinet in 1878, and would serve under three prime ministers: John A. Macdonald, John Abbott, and John Thompson. He served variously as Minister of Customs (1878–1892), Minister of Militia and Defence (1892), and Minister of Trade and Commerce (1892–1894). Bowell kept his Commons seat continuously for 25 years, through a period of Liberal Party rule in the 1870s. In 1892, Bowell was appointed to the Senate. He became Leader of the Government in the Senate the following year.

In December 1894, Prime Minister Thompson unexpectedly died in office. The Earl of Aberdeen, Canada's governor general, appointed Bowell to replace Thompson as prime minister, due to his status as the most senior cabinet member. The main problem of Bowell's tenure as prime minister was the Manitoba Schools Question. His attempts at compromise alienated members of his own party, and following a Cabinet revolt in early 1896 he was forced to resign in favour of Charles Tupper. Bowell stayed on as a senator until his death at the age of 93, but never again held ministerial office; he served continuously as a Canadian parliamentarian for 50 years.

== Early life, career, and family ==
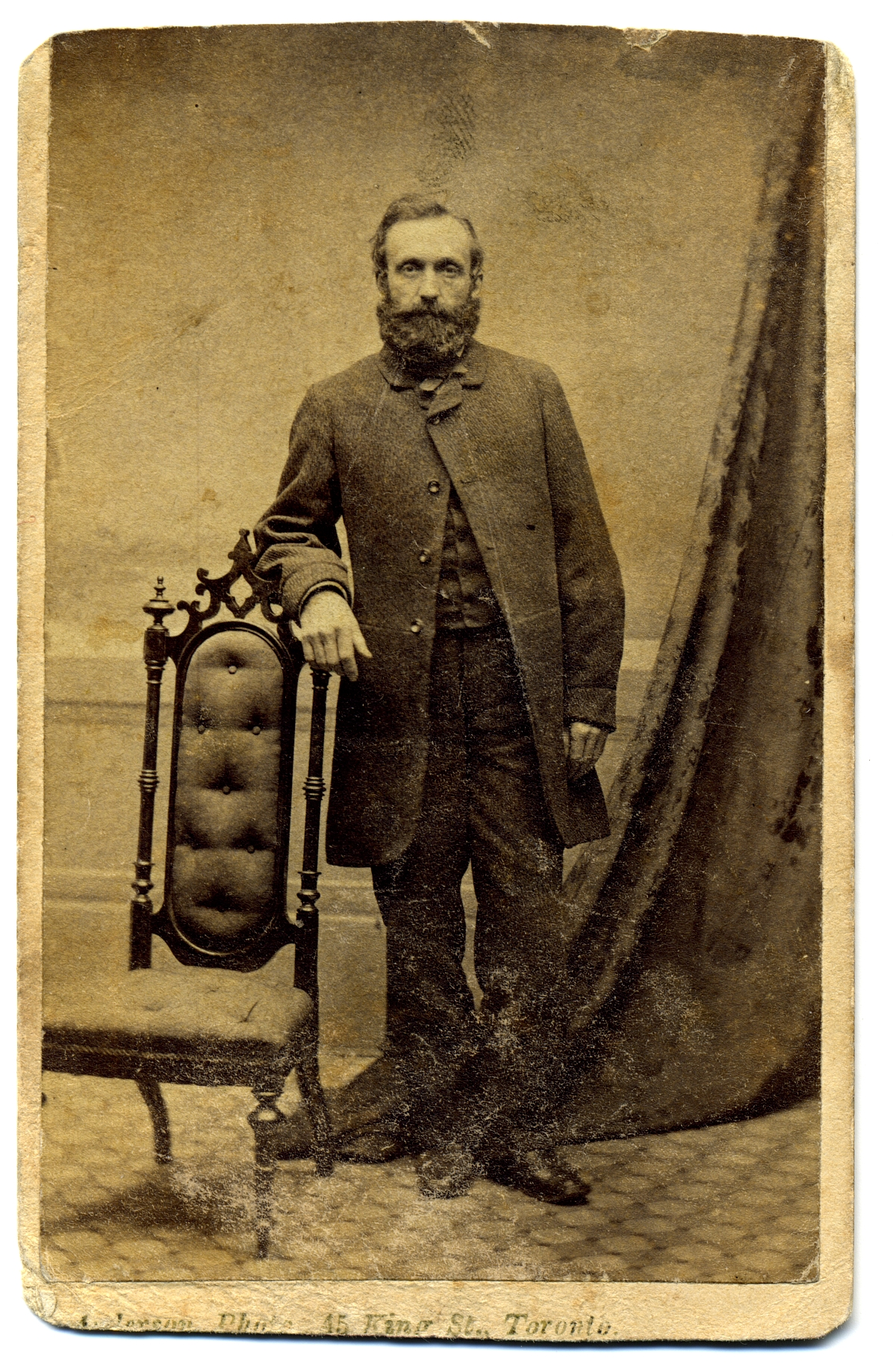
Bowell in 1874

Bowell was born in Rickinghall, England, to John Bowell and Elizabeth Marshall. In 1832 his family emigrated to Belleville, Upper Canada, where he apprenticed with the printer at the town newspaper, The Belleville Intelligencer. He became a successful printer and editor with that newspaper, and later its owner. He was a Freemason and an Orangeman, serving as grandmaster of the Orange Order of British North America, 1870–1878. In 1847 he married Harriet Moore, with whom he had five sons and four daughters.

== Military service ==
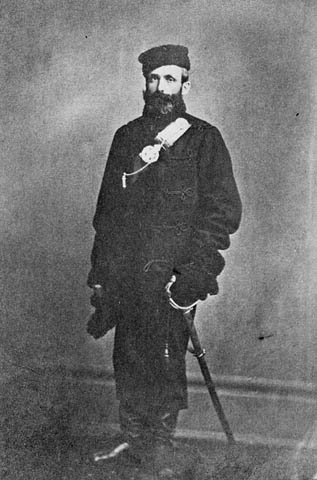
Mackenzie Bowell, ensign in the Belleville Rifles

A keen supporter of the militia in Hastings County, he was appointed an ensign in the 1st Belleville Militia on July 24, 1856. He helped organize the Belleville Volunteer Militia Rifle Company in 1857, with whom he served on active duty at Amherstburg, Upper Canada, during the Trent Affair. He joined the 15th Belleville Battalion (The Argyll Light Infantry) in 1863, and served on active duty as an ensign in No. 6 Company, 1st (Western) Administrative Battalion, on the Niagara Frontier from December 1864 to July 1865.

On March 23, 1866, he was promoted to captain in command of No. 1 Company, 15th Battalion and fought in the Fenian Raids of 1866, serving at Prescott and being awarded the Canada General Service Medal. He was promoted to major in the 49th (Hastings) Battalion of Rifles on February 22, 1867, and qualified for the First Class Certificate at the Military School of Instruction on March 1. He was promoted to brevet lieutenant-colonel on February 22, 1872, and retired from the militia on March 24, 1874, with the rank of lieutenant-colonel in that regiment.

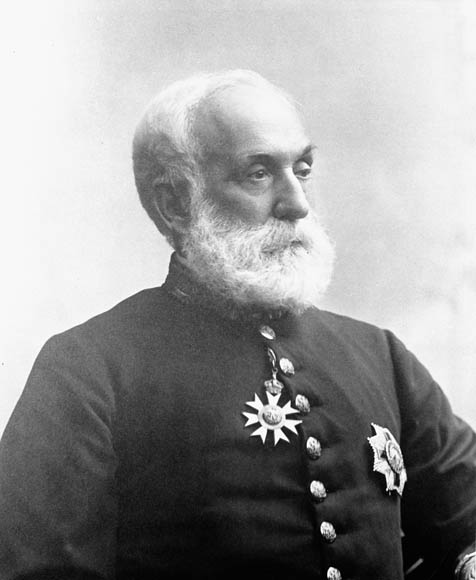

== Elected to Parliament ==
Bowell was first elected to the House of Commons in 1867 as a Conservative for the riding of Hastings North, Ontario. He held his seat for the Conservatives when they lost the election of January 1874, in the wake of the Pacific Scandal. Later that year he was instrumental in having Louis Riel expelled from the House.

== Appointed to Cabinet, senator ==
In 1878, with the Conservatives again governing, he joined the Cabinet as minister of customs. In 1892 he became minister of militia and defence, having held his Commons seat continuously for 25 years. A competent, hardworking administrator, Bowell remained in Cabinet as minister of trade and commerce, a newly created portfolio, after he became a senator that same year. His visit to Australia in 1893 led to the first leaders' conference of British colonies and territories, held in Ottawa in 1894. He became leader of the government in the Senate on October 31, 1893.

== Prime minister (1894–1896) ==
In December 1894, Prime Minister John Sparrow David Thompson died suddenly, and Bowell, as the most senior Cabinet minister, was appointed in Thompson's stead by the governor general. Bowell thus became the second of just two Canadian prime ministers (after John Abbott) to hold that office while serving in the Senate rather than the House of Commons.

=== Manitoba Schools Question ===
As prime minister, Bowell faced the Manitoba Schools Question. In 1890, Manitoba had abolished public funding for denominational schools, both Catholic and Protestant, which many thought was contrary to the provisions made for denominational schools in the Manitoba Act of 1870. However, in a court challenge, the Judicial Committee of the Privy Council held that Manitoba's abolition of public funding for denominational schools was consistent with the Manitoba Act provision. In a second court case, the Judicial Committee held that the federal Parliament had the authority to enact remedial legislation to force Manitoba to re-establish the funding.

=== Leadership crisis ===
Bowell and his predecessors struggled to solve this problem, which divided the country and even Bowell's own Cabinet. He was further hampered in his handling of the issue by his own indecisiveness on it and by his inability, as a senator, to take part in debates in the House of Commons. Bowell backed legislation, already drafted, that would have forced Manitoba to restore its Catholic schools, but then postponed it due to opposition within his Cabinet. With the ordinary business of government at a standstill, several members of Cabinet decided that Bowell was incompetent to lead. To force him to step down, seven ministers resigned and then foiled the appointment of successors. Bowell denounced them as "a nest of traitors".

=== Resignation ===
Bowell was forced to resign as prime minister. After ten days, following an intervention on Bowell's behalf by the governor general, the government crisis was resolved and matters seemingly returned to normal when six of the ministers were reinstated, but leadership was then effectively held by Charles Tupper, who had joined Cabinet at the same time, filling the seventh place. Tupper, who had been Canadian High Commissioner to the United Kingdom, had been recalled by the plotters to replace Bowell. Bowell formally resigned in favour of Tupper at the end of the parliamentary session.

== Later life and death ==
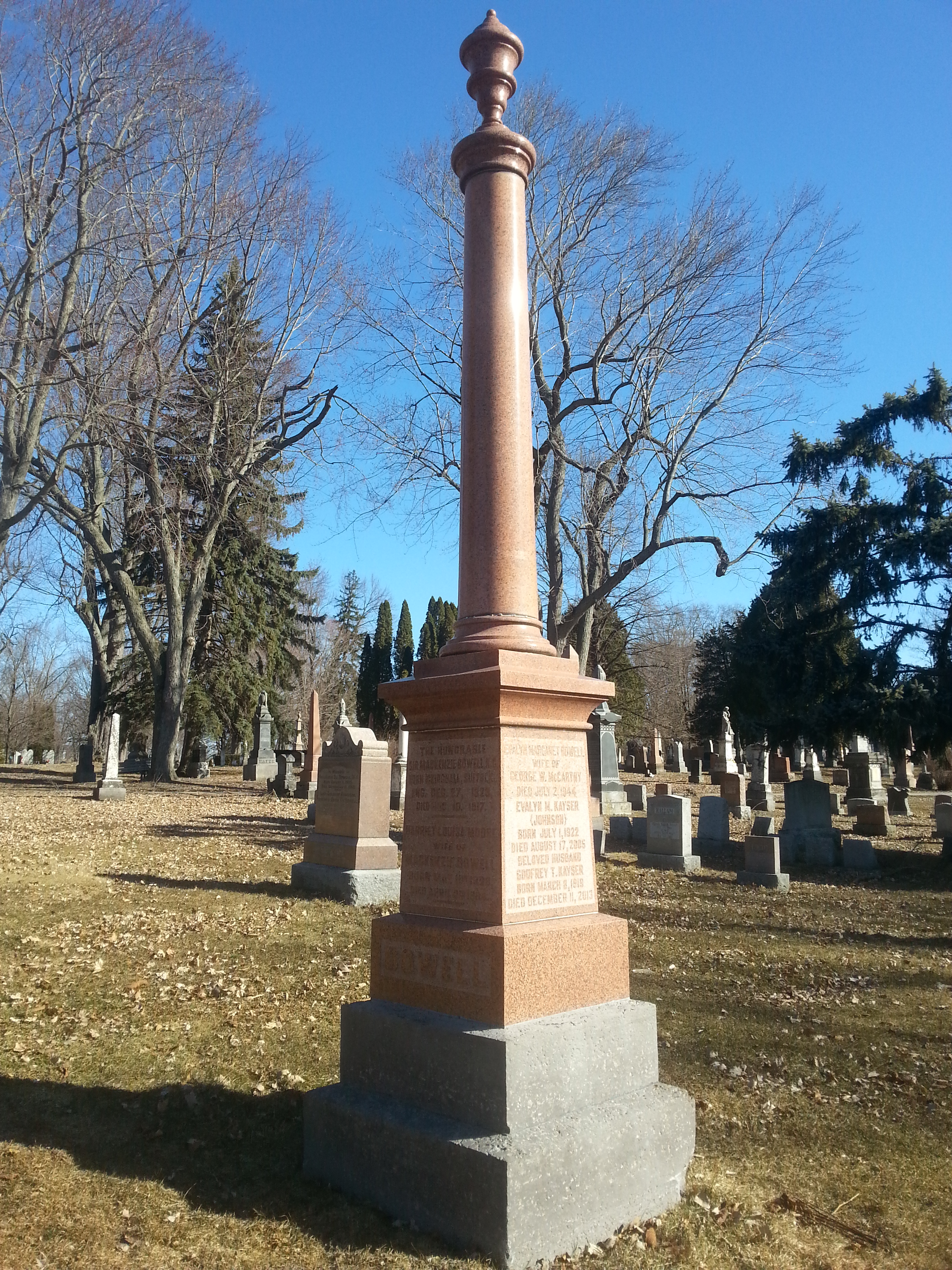
Bowell's grave stone

Bowell stayed in the Senate, serving as his party's leader there until 1906, and afterward as a regular senator until his death in 1917, having served continuously for more than 50 years as a federal parliamentarian.

He died of pneumonia in Belleville, seventeen days short of his 94th birthday. He was buried in the Belleville cemetery. His funeral was attended by a full complement of the Orange Order, but not by any currently or formerly elected member of the government.

== Legacy ==
Bowell was designated a National Historic Person in 1945, on the advice of the national Historic Sites and Monuments Board.

The Post Office Department honored Bowell with a commemorative stamp in 1954, part of a series on prime ministers.

In their 1998 study of the Canadian prime ministers up through Jean Chrétien, J. L. Granatstein and Norman Hillmer found that a survey of Canadian historians ranked Bowell #19 out of the 20 prime ministers up until then.

Until 2017, Bowell remained the only Canadian prime minister without a full-length biography of his life and career. This shortfall was solved when the Belleville historian Betsy Dewar Boyce's book The Accidental Prime Minister was published by Bancroft, Ontario publisher Kirby Books. The book was published on the centennial of Bowell's death. Boyce had died in 2007, having unsuccessfully sought a publisher for her work for a decade.

== Supreme Court appointments ==
The following jurist was appointed to the Supreme Court of Canada by the governor general during Bowell's tenure:

- Désiré Girouard (September 28, 1895 – March 22, 1911)

== See also ==
- List of prime ministers of Canada

== Archives ==
There is a Sir Mackenzie Bowell fonds at Library and Archives Canada. It includes 6.1 m of textual records.

== Notes ==
Political offices
Preceded by Isaac Burpee	Minister of Customs; 1878 – 1892	Succeeded by Joseph-Adolphe Chapleau
Preceded by vacant	Minister of Railways and Canals; 1891 – 1892	Succeeded by John Graham Haggart
Preceded by Adolphe-Philippe Caron	Minister of Militia and Defence; 1892	Succeeded by James Colebrooke Patterson
Preceded by office created	Minister of Trade and Commerce; 1892-1894	Succeeded by William Bullock Ives
Preceded by John Abbott	Leader of the Government in the Senate of Canada; 1893 – 1896	Succeeded by Oliver Mowat
Preceded by John Thompson	Prime Minister of Canada; 1894–1896	Succeeded by Charles Tupper
Preceded by John Thompson	Leader of the Conservative Party; 1894–1896	Succeeded by Charles Tupper
Preceded by William Bullock Ives	President of the Privy Council; 1894 – 1896	Succeeded by Auguste Réal Angers
Preceded by Arthur Rupert Dickey	Minister of Militia and Defence; 1896	Succeeded by Alphonse Desjardins
Preceded by George Foster	Minister of Finance and Receiver General; 1896	Succeeded by George Foster
Preceded by Richard William Scott	Leader of the Opposition in the Senate of Canada; 1896 – 1906	Succeeded by James Alexander Lougheed
Parliament of Canada
Preceded by None	Member of Parliament from Hastings North; 1867 – 1892	Succeeded by Alexander A.W. Carscallen
Preceded by John Carling	Senator from Hastings; 1892 – 1917	Succeeded by Robert Mulholland
