= John Hayes (painter) =

British painter

John Hayes (1786?–1866) was a British portrait-painter. He died aged 80.

== Works ==
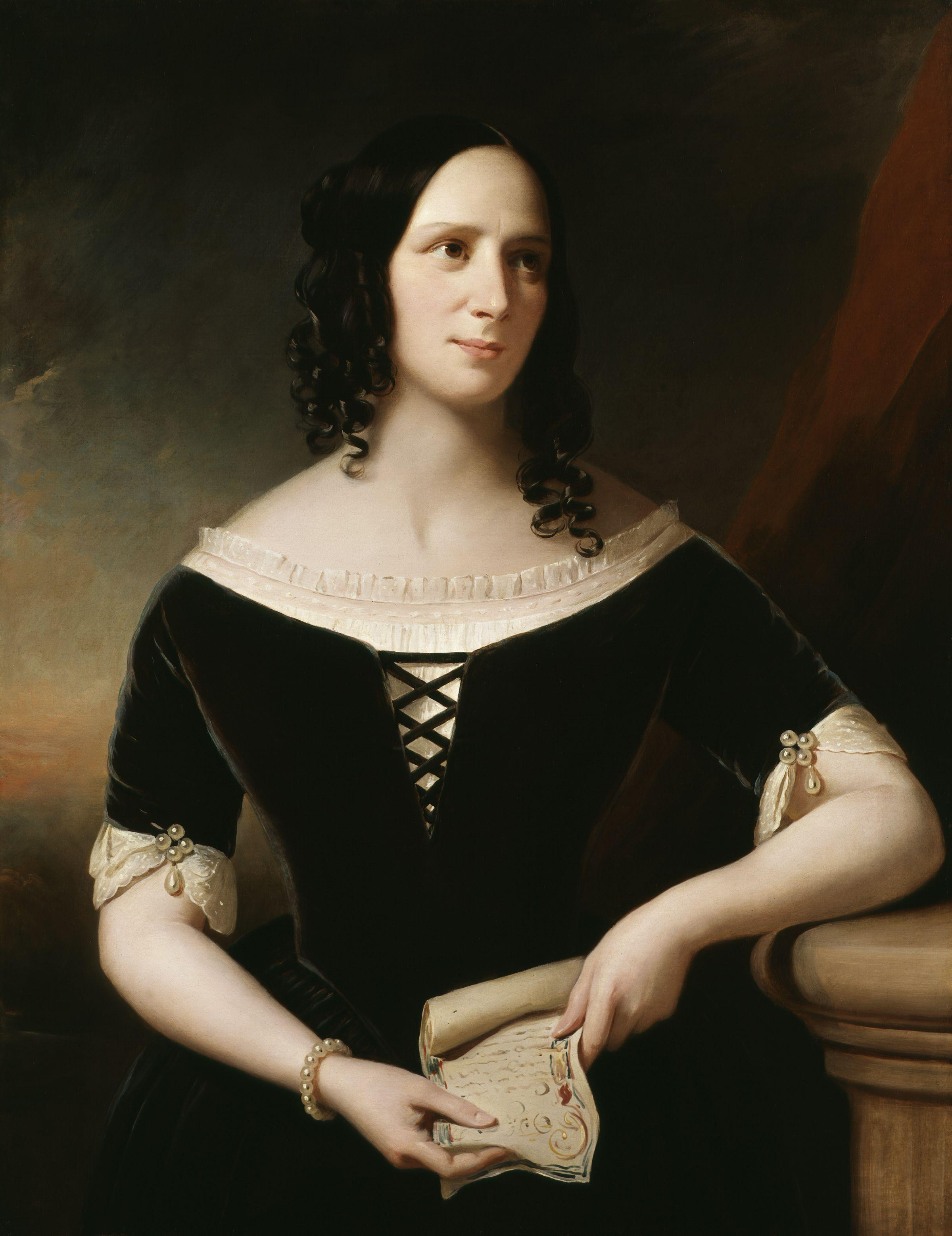
Portrait of Agnes Strickland, 1846 portrait by John Hayes, in the National Portrait Gallery, London

Hayes first exhibited in the Royal Academy in 1814. He continued to show there to 1851; his contributions were chiefly portraits, though he occasionally sent a subject picture. Hayes had a good practice as a portrait-painter. His portrait of Agnes Strickland was engraved by Frederick Christian Lewis, as frontispiece to her Lives of the Queens of England (1851).

== Notes ==
Attribution

This article incorporates text from a publication now in the public domain: Stephen, Leslie; Lee, Sidney, eds. (1891). "Hayes, John (1786?-1866)". Dictionary of National Biography. Vol. 25. London: Smith, Elder & Co.
