= Benjamin Moodie =

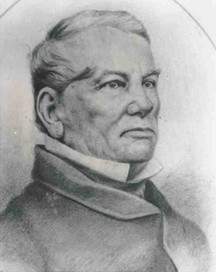
Benjamin Moodie

Captain Benjamin Moodie (1789 - 2 April 1856) was the 10th Laird of Melsetter who led a party of 200 Scottish immigrants to the Cape Colony in 1817, three years before the arrival of the 1820 Settlers.

Moodie served in the Ross and Caithness Militia and returned from the Napoleonic Wars in 1815 as a half-pay officer, and was forced to sell the heavily indebted family estate in the Orkney Islands. In 1817 he led a party of indentured Scottish artisans to settle in the Cape Colony. The first party arrived in Cape Town on 14 June 1817 on the ship Brilliant, followed by a further 50 on the Garland on 23 August 1817, and a third party on the Clyde on 24 September 1817. Among the party was David Hume, who became an explorer and big-game hunter, and his brother Donald Moodie. A second brother, John Moodie, joined him in South Africa in 1819.

Benjamin Moodie settled on the farm Groot Vaders Bosch near Swellendam and later at White Sands, now known as Witsand, at the mouth of the Breede River. After his wife Margaret died in 1838, he returned to Britain where he married Susan Barnett, returning to the Cape in 1841 with 21 orphan children.

In 1892, Benjamin Moodie's grandson Thomas Moodie led a party of mostly Afrikaner farmers to settle in Rhodesia, where they established the town of Melsetter, named after the Moodie ancestral home in the Orkney Islands.
