= David Hume (explorer) =

Scottish-born South African explorer

David Hume (1796, Berwick, Scotland – 1 February 1864, Grahamstown) was an explorer and big-game hunter who lived much of his life in Cape Colony.

David Hume was born in Berwick, Scotland and went to Cape Colony with Benjamin Moodie's Scottish settlers in 1817. He became a pioneer trader, explorer and renowned big-game hunter. Starting in 1829 when he accompanied Robert Moffat, he arranged trips into Mzilikazi's territory and was one of the first Europeans to meet this chief of the Matabele. In 1830 he explored the region north of the Limpopo River searching for gold. He was also the first recorded European to enter Bamangwato, the present-day Botswana. Hume heard reports of the existence of Lake Ngami, but in 1836 lacked the funds to mount an expedition. He had settled at Kuruman with his family and annually sold the products of his hunting on the Market Square in Grahamstown. On 2 April 1851 he sold 12,333 pounds (5,594 kg) of ivory for £5,260 and karosses and ostrich plumes to the value of £5,802. In 1854 he was elected as one of eight municipal commissioners of Grahamstown.

== Death ==
Hume died in Grahamstown on 1 February 1864.

== Family ==
Hume married Margaret Pirie on 12 December 1829 in Grahamstown; she had immigrated with her father in 1820, aged 11. She had been born in England about 1807 and died on 20 August 1897 in Grahamstown. Details are known of only one of their children - David Robert Hume born about 1841 and married Mary Ann Abigail Thomas, also born about 1841 in Albany and died 17 November 1865 at "Glen Cliff", Bedford.
