= Roughing it in the Bush =

Memoir of 1830s Ontario

Roughing It in the Bush (Full title: Roughing It in The Bush: or, Forest Life in Canada) is an account of life as a Canadian settler by Susanna Moodie. Moodie immigrated to Upper Canada (soon to become Canada West), near modern-day Peterborough, Ontario during the 1830s. At the suggestion of her editor, she wrote a "guide" to settler life for British subjects considering coming to Canada. Roughing It in the Bush was first published in London in 1852 (then Toronto in 1871). It was Moodie's most successful literary work. The work is part memoir, part novelization of her experiences, and is structured as a chronological series of sketches.

== Immigration to Canada ==
Publisher Richard Bentley's foreword to the third edition published in London in 1854 describes the "Canadian mania" that "pervaded the middle ranks of British society" in the 1830s. Immigrants paid a hefty fee to ship's agents who took them across the Atlantic, and these agents did their best to drum up business by marketing Canada as a British emigrant's utopia:

Canada became the great land-mark for the rich in hope and poor in purse. Public newspapers and private letters teemed with the unheard-of advantages to be derived from a settlement in this highly-favoured region. Its salubrious climate, its fertile soil, commercial advantages, great water privileges, its proximity to the mother country, and last, not least, its almost total exemption from taxation—that bugbear which keeps honest John Bull in a state of constant ferment—were the theme of every tongue, and lauded beyond all praise. The general interest, once excited, was industriously kept alive by pamphlets, published by interested parties, which prominently set forth all the good to be derived from a settlement in the Backwoods of Canada; while they carefully concealed the toil and hardship to be endured in order to secure these advantages.

Susanna Moodie was raised in a solidly middle-class family in rural, coastal Suffolk. By the 1830s, emigration from England to its colonies, including Canada, had become a popular option for the ambitious and the adventurous seeking to improve their fortunes. Moodie came to Canada in 1832 with her husband John and daughter. Her sister, Catherine Parr Traill, came to Canada at about the same time, as did Susanna and Catherine's brother, Samuel Strickland. Between 1832 and 1834, Susanna and Catherine's families settled on adjacent bush farms along the eastern shore of Lake Katchewanooka, immediately north of present-day Lakefield near Peterborough, Ontario.

== Roughing It in the Bush ==
Roughing It in the Bush was part of a trilogy Moodie wrote to chronicle the immigrant experience in Canada. The other works that complete the trilogy are Flora Lyndsay (1854), a prequel that describes the initial preparations for immigration, and an exploration of Canadian towns and institutions in Life in the Clearings (1853). Moodie's publishing background in Canada consisted of short contributions to periodicals. She and her husband edited Victoria Magazine from 1837 to 1838, before the magazine was shut down. She contributed to Literary Garland of Montreal beginning in late 1838. She was one of the principal contributors over the next 12 years, publishing "serialized novels based on English life, several of them expansions of earlier short work, poems on Old World and Canadian subjects, and most important, a series of six "Canadian Sketches" that formed the nucleus of Roughing It in the Bush."

Moodie's account of the hardships of settler life contrasted sharply against the image conjured by the British advertisers. Moodie's tone is frank, and her style is vividly descriptive:

The conduct of many of the settlers, who considered themselves gentlemen, and would have been very much affronted to have been called otherwise, was often more reprehensible than that of the poor Irish emigrants, to whom they should have set an example of order and sobriety. The behaviour of these young men drew upon them the severe but just censures of the poorer class, whom they regarded in every way as their inferiors. "That blackguard calls himself a gentleman. In what respect is he better than us?" was an observation too frequently made use of at these gatherings. To see a bad man in the very worst point of view, follow him to a bee: be he profane, licentious, quarrelsome, or a rogue, all his native wickedness will be fully developed there. (Chapter 7, Our Logging Bee)

Disorientation in a new environment, the dirty and exhausting physical demands of land-clearing and house raising, and the gossip and friction amongst the new settlers are explored in detail. Moodie added touches of humour, but there is an underlying irony to such passages, emphasizing the disconnect between immigrant illusions and Canadian realities. Moodie's treatment of the settler experience differed from the works published by her sister, Catharine Parr Traill. The Backwoods of Canada (1836), by Traill, presents a more "pragmatic and optimistic" account, stressing the "scientific" and the "factual" examination of settlement realities.

== Reception ==
Roughing It in the Bush was well received by the public when it was published in the 1850s, with several editions being produced in both Britain and the United States. It was not until 1871 that the book was published in Canada, and Moodie was disappointed with its reception there. She was subject to some criticism, such as charges of anti-Canadian and anti-Irish bias, which she felt obliged to address in Life in the Clearings, where she asserts her love for the country resulting from the years of "comfort and peace" she had enjoyed since leaving the bush". Moodie's work remains a canonical work of Canadian literature, and is valued as much for its historic and cultural significance as for its literary merit.

== Criticism ==
Writer, musician, and academic Leanne Betasamosake Simpson, a Mississauga Nishnaabeg (member of Alderville First Nation) responded to Roughing it in the Bush in 2020 via a counter-novel, Noopiming: The Cure for White Ladies (House of Anansi, 2020; University of Minnesota Press, 2021.) The blend of prose and poetry counters Moodie's logics of colonialism to reclaim Indigenous alternatives and aesthetics in critical response to English Canadian settler and author Susanna Moodie's 1852 memoir. Simpson writes about the daily labors of healing and Indigenous transformation. It asserts a future rooted in the still present past. Noopiming was short-listed for the Governor General's Literary Award for fiction in 2020.
