= Portrait of Agnes Strickland =

Painting by John Hayes

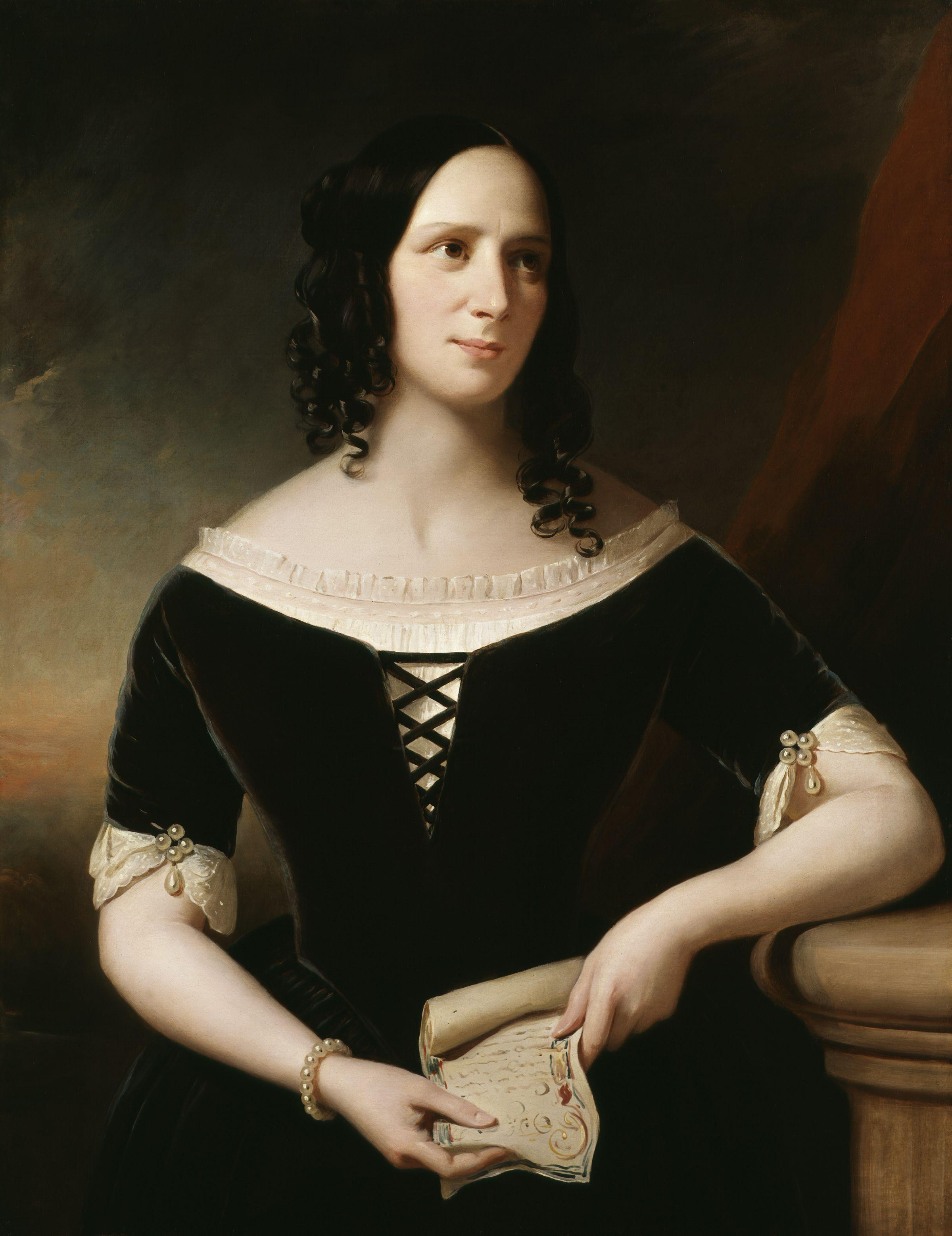
- Artist: John Hayes
- Year: 1846
- Type: Oil on canvas, portrait painting
- Dimensions: 234 cm × 182 cm (92.1 in × 71.8 in)
- Location: National Portrait Gallery, London

Portrait of Agnes Strickland is an 1846 portrait painting by the British artist John Hayes. It depicts the historian and writer Agnes Strickland who was noted for her Lives of the Queens of England. She is shown in a black velvet dress and holding a scroll.

Hayes was a portrait painter whose career spanned the Regency and early Victorian eras. An engraving based on the picture was created by Frederick Christian Lewis and was then used as the frontispiece of the Lives of the Queens of England. The painting was displayed at the Royal Academy Exhibition of 1847 held at the National Gallery. Considered a very good likeness by her family, it remained in her possession until her death and when it was bequeathed to the National Portrait Gallery.

== Bibliography ==
- Fahey, David M. Sister Historians in Early Victorian England: Agnes and Eliza Strickland. Cambridge Scholars Publishing, 2026.
- Laurence, Anne, Perry, Gill & Bellamy, Joan. Women, Scholarship and Criticism C. 1790-1900. Manchester University Press, 2000.
- Ormond, Richard. Early Victorian Portraits. University of California Press, 1974.
- Pope-Hennessy, Una. Agnes Strickland: Biographer of the Queens of England, 1796-1874. Chatto & Windus, 1940.
