= Betsy Dewar Boyce =

Canadian historian

Betsy Dewar Boyce (March 27, 1913—August 12, 2007) was a Canadian historian.

== Biography ==
Born in Hamilton, Ontario, Canada, Boyce graduated from McMaster University in Hamilton in 1933, with an Arts degree, winning a gold medal. She attended Osgoode Hall Law School in Toronto for two years, until 1935.

Boyce was active in the University Women's Club in Toronto. When she moved to Belleville, she was active in the Belleville community as a New Democratic Party activist, as a member of Amnesty International, and as the picture archivist for the Hastings County Historical Society. Boyce died in Belleville, Ontario, Canada in 2007.

== Major works ==
Her first major work was The Rebels of Hastings, referring to Hastings County, the region in southeastern Ontario which contains Belleville. This book was published by the University of Toronto Press in 1992; ISBN 978-080-2059864.

Her second major work was published posthumously, in 2017. This book, entitled The Accidental Prime Minister: The Biography of Sir Mackenzie Bowell (ISBN 978-1-926529-09-7), is the first major biography of Sir Mackenzie Bowell, who served as Canada's fifth prime minister, from 1894 to 1896, as part of a 50-year parliamentary career. She had completed the work in 2007, but could not find a publisher; the book has been published in 2017 by Kirby Books of Bancroft, Ontario.
