= Jane Margaret Strickland =

British writer (1800–1888)

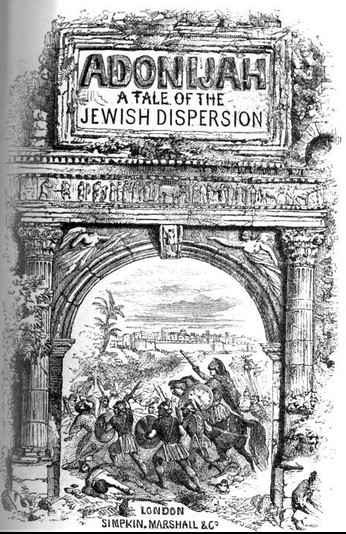
- illustration from her 1856 book
- Born: 18 April 1800; North West Kent
- Died: 14 June 1888 (aged 88); Southwold

Jane Margaret Strickland (18 April 1800 – 14 June 1888) was a British writer.

== Life ==
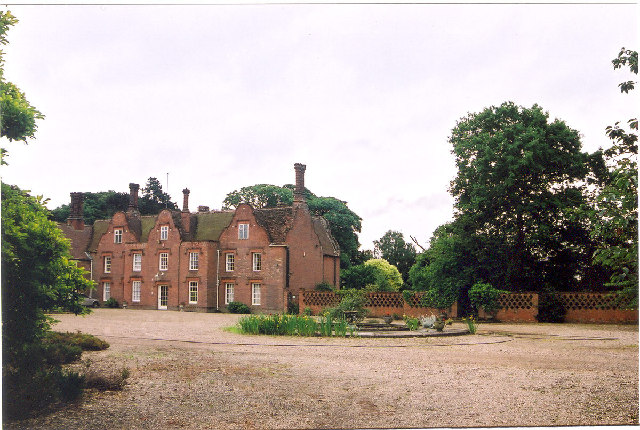
Reydon Hall

Strickland was born in Kent in 1800. The daughter of Thomas Strickland and Elizabeth (born Homer) of Reydon Hall, Suffolk, Her siblings were Elizabeth, Sarah, Agnes, Catharine Parr, Susanna, Thomas, and Samuel. All of the children except Sarah eventually became writers. By 1840 she had two sisters living in Canada and two others who had moved out of the house leaving Jane to look after her mother who died in 1864.

In 1854, Jane published a schoolbook, Rome, Regal and Republican: A Family History of Rome that was edited by her sister Agnes. The proceeds made her financially independent and allowed her to buy her own cottage.

In 1856, she published Adonijah which is an unlikely, but engaging, story about a Jewish child living at the time of the Roman Empire who eventually becomes a Christian.

Strickland published a biography of her sister Agnes in 1887 and died at her cottage in Southwold the following year.

== Works ==
- Moral Lessons And Stories, From The Proverbs of Salomon, (c1820)
- Rome, Regal And Republican, (1834)
- Ellen Cleveland; or, The Young Samaritan, (1834)
- James Ellis; or, A Father's Warning Neglected, (1835)
- Sacred Minstrelsy; or, Poetry for the Devout [edited], (1838)
- The Nameless Grave; and, The Blind Restored To Sight, (1838)
- National Prejudice; or, The French Prisoner of War, (1841)
- The Planter's Daughter And Her Slave, (1842)
- Edward Evelyn: A Tale of the Rebellion of Prince Charles Edward, (1843)
- A Memoir of the Life, Writings...Of Edmund Cartwright, (1843)
- The Spanish Conscript And His Family, (1847)
- The Orphan Captive; or, Christian Endurance, (1848)
- Anne And Jane; or, Good Advice And Good Example, (c1850)
- Adonijah: A Tale of the Jewish Dispersion, (1856)
- Christmas Holidays; or, A New Way of Spending Them, (1864)
- Life of Agnes Strickland, (1887)
- The Village Flower, (1938)
- Early Lessons
