= Belleville cemetery =

Cemetery in Hastings County, Ontario, Canada

- Interactive map of Belleville cemetery

Details
- Established: 1872
- Location: 631 Dundas Street West, Belleville, Ontario
- Country: Canada
- Coordinates: 44.1409°N 77.4189°W
- Owned by: Belleville Cemetery Company
- Size: 65 acres (26 ha)
- No. of graves: >18,000
- Website: Belleville Cemetery

Belleville cemetery is a cemetery located in the city of Belleville, Ontario, Canada. Incorporated in 1872, it now covers 65 acres (260,000 m^{2}) along the north shore of the Bay of Quinte.

== History ==
The Belleville Cemetery Company was organized in 1872. Previous to this, burials were made in the city church yards but it became evident that more room would be required and preferably, out of town. Interested citizens therefore banded together and purchased 65 acres of land in what was then The Township of Sidney and fronting on the Trent Road, now designated as Dundas Street West within the limits of the City of Belleville. These pioneers purchased from one to as many as six lots, each lot containing six or eight graves. Each lot owner became a shareholder. The only shareholders then, as now, were the lot owners.

The company is owned by the lot owners and is administered by a board of directors composed of up to nine lot owners elected for three-year terms at an annual meeting, three to be elected each year.

The Belleville Cemetery Company, a not-for-profit corporation, is dedicated to the provision and maintenance of burial locations for the citizens of Belleville and the surrounding area in a serene, park-like setting. The cemetery is operated solely for the benefit of the public. All money received is employed or reserved solely for the administration and maintenance of the cemetery, and for the development of additional burial spaces and facilities to meet the ongoing requirements of Belleville and the surrounding area.

The cemetery is the burial place of Canadian prime minister Mackenzie Bowell and author Susanna Moodie. Also, it hold professional hockey players Albert Holway and Davie Kerr.

The cemetery contains the war graves of 24 Commonwealth service personnel, 12 from each of the World Wars.
