= Agnes Strickland =

English writer and editor

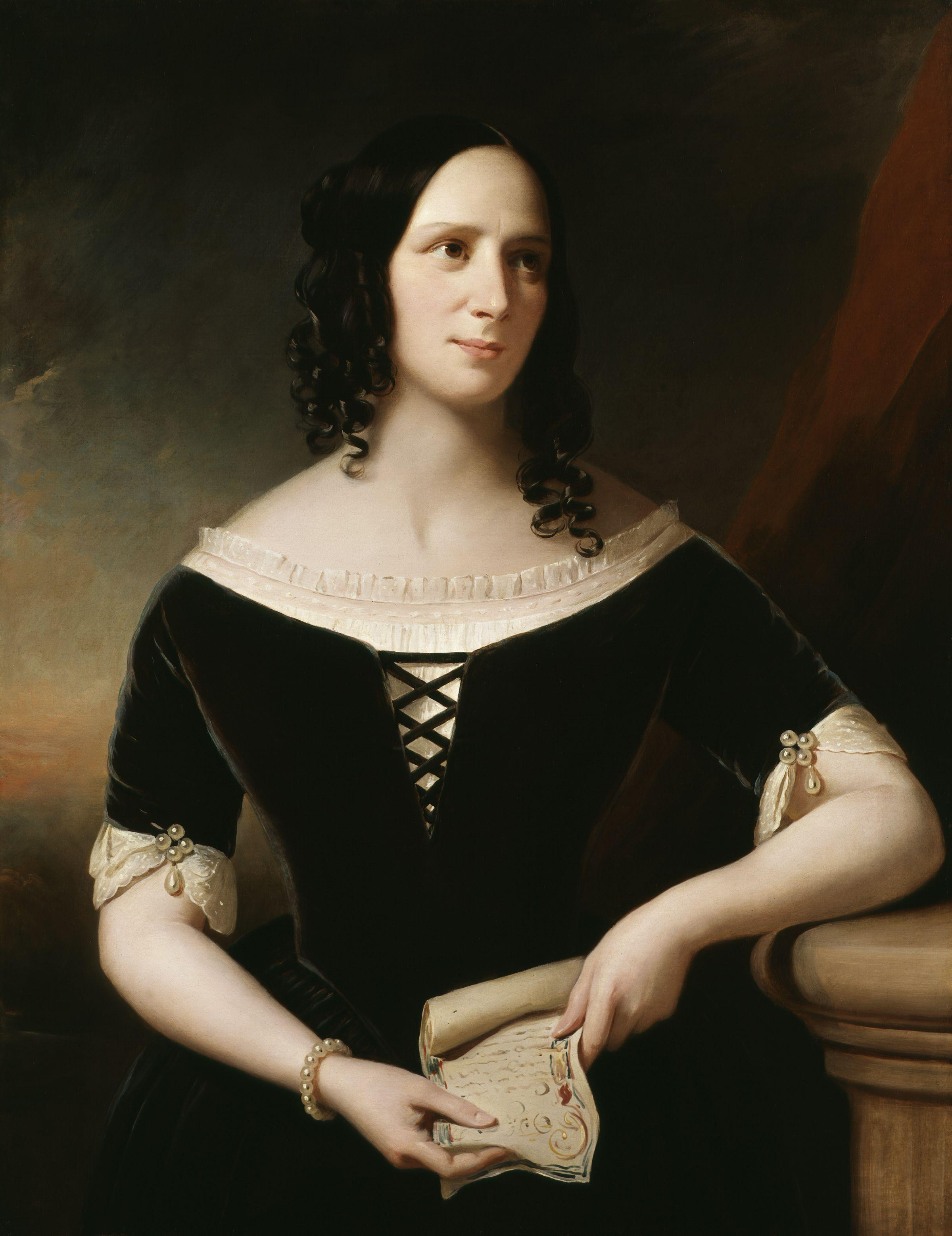
- Portrait of Agnes Strickland by John Hayes, 1846
- Born: 18 July 1796; Rotherhithe, Surrey
- Died: 8 July 1874 (aged 77); Southwold, Suffolk
- Occupation: Author
- Writing career
- Genre: History

Agnes Strickland (18 July 1796 – 8 July 1874) was an English historical writer and poet. She is particularly remembered for her Lives of the Queens of England (12 vols, 1840–1848).

== Biography ==
=== Formative years ===
The daughter of Thomas Strickland and his wife Elizabeth (née Homer), Agnes was born in Rotherhithe, at that time in Surrey, where her father was employed as a manager of the Greenland Dock. She was christened at St Mary's Church, Rotherhithe on 18 August 1796. The family subsequently moved to Thorpe Hamlet, Norwich, and then Stowe House, near Bungay, Suffolk, before settling in 1808 at Reydon Hall, Reydon, near Southwold, also in Suffolk. Agnes' siblings were Elizabeth, Sarah, Jane Margaret, Catharine Parr Traill, Susanna Moodie (1803–1885), Thomas, and Samuel Strickland. Agnes and her elder sister, Elizabeth, were educated by their father to a standard more usual for boys at that time. All of the children except Sarah and Tom eventually became writers.

Agnes began her literary career with a poem, Worcester Field, followed by The Seven Ages of Woman and Demetrius. Abandoning poetry, she produced Historical Tales of Illustrious British Children (1833), The Pilgrims of Walsingham (1835), and Tales and Stories from History (1836).

=== Historical biographies ===
By the early 1830s, Agnes and Elizabeth Strickland had decided to collaborate on a series of popular history biographies of the queens of England, eventually numbering 12 volumes. They were reading historical manuscripts at the British Museum Library every day.

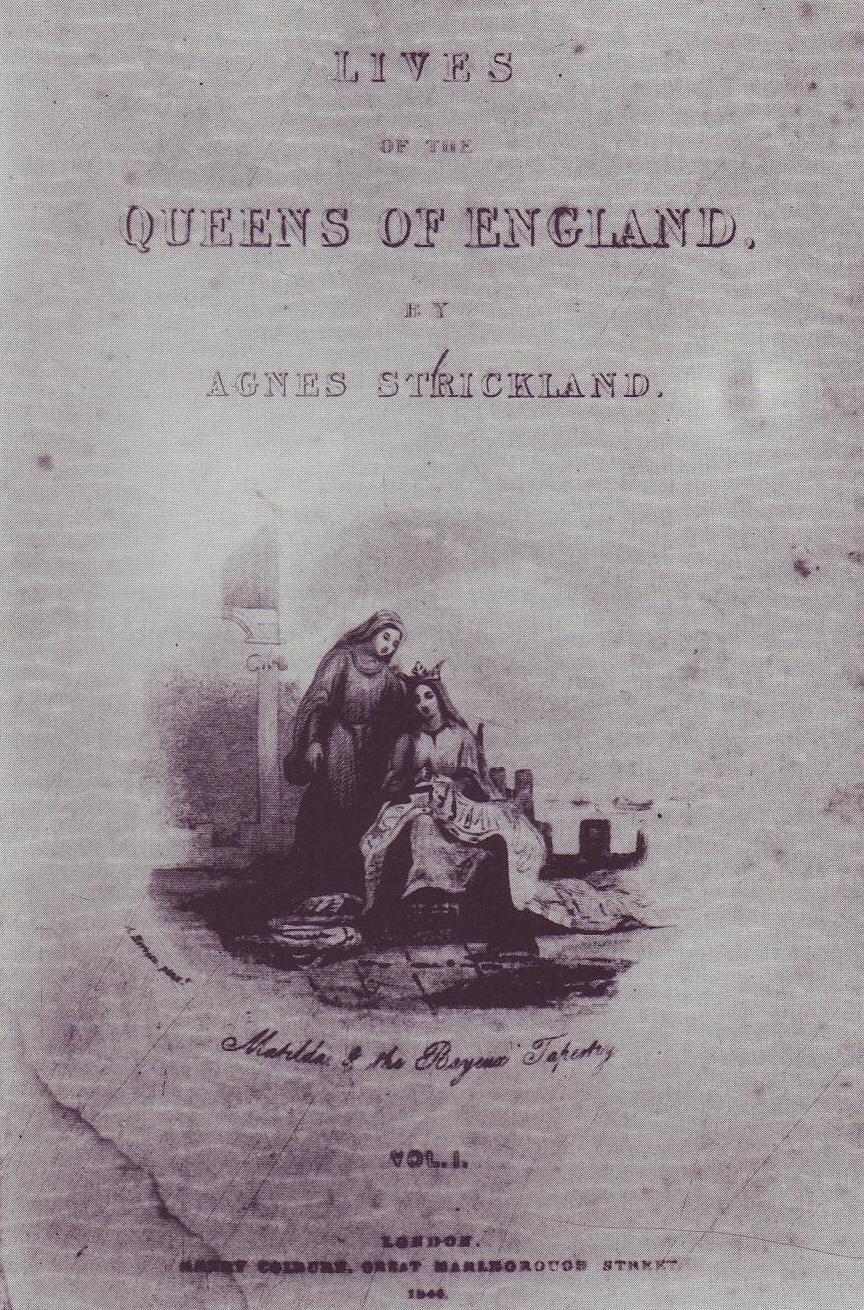
Agnes Strickland - Lives of the Queens of England 1844

Much of the Strickland sisters' historical research and writing was done by Elizabeth. Elizabeth, however, refused all publicity and, in an agreement between the two sisters, Agnes was named as the sole author. Their biographical works are fine representations of the biographies written by Victorian women, many of which focused on female subjects and included aspects of social history such as dress, manners, and diet.

The Lives of the Queens of England was very popular and sold well. By 1854, it had reached its fourth edition.

When the Queens of England collection was complete, the pair continued their work with Lives of the Queens of Scotland.

Strickland's researches were laborious and conscientious as she relied on studying archived material for information, and she remains a useful source. Her style is engaging and anecdotal, not as objective as most modern historians, but it gives valuable insight into the mores of her own time.

=== Later years and death ===
Following the death of her mother on 3 September 1864, Strickland left her longtime residence, Reydon Hall. She was awarded a civil list pension of £100 on 3 August 1870. In 1872, her health deteriorated after a fall resulted in a broken ankle and subsequent partial paralysis. She died in Southwold on 13 July 1874 and was buried in the churchyard there.

== Other family and friends ==
Agnes' sisters Susanna Moodie and Catharine Parr Traill became particularly well known for their works about pioneer life in early Canada, where they both emigrated with their husbands in 1832. Agnes Strickland was a friend and correspondent of the Scottish poet and composer, Mary Maxwell Campbell.

== Literary works ==
=== Biographies ===
- Lives of the Queens of England. 12 vols., 1840–1848
- The Letters of Mary Queen of Scots. 1842–1843
- Lives of the Queens of Scotland and English Princesses Connected with the Regal Succession of Great Britain. 8 Vols., 1851–1859
- Lives of the Bachelor Kings of England. 1861
- The Lives of the Seven Bishops Committed to the Tower in 1688. Enriched and Illustrated with Personal Letters, Now First Published, from the Bodleian Library. 1866
- Lives of the Tudor Princesses, Including Lady Jane Gray and Her Sisters. 1868
- Lives of the Last Four Princesses of the Royal House of Stuart. 1872

=== Children's books ===
- The Moss-House: In Which Many of the Works of Nature Are Rendered a Source of Amusement to Children. 1822
- The Tell-Tell. 1823
- The Aviary; Or, An Agreeable Visit. Intended for Children. 1824
- The Use of Sight: Or, I Wish I Were Julia : Intended for the Amusement and Instruction of Children. 1824
- The Little Tradesman, or, A Peep into English Industry. 1824
- The Young Emigrant. 1826
- The Rival Crusoes, or, The Shipwreck: Also A Voyage to Norway; and The Fisherman's Cottage : Founded on Facts. 1826
- The Juvenile Forget Me Not; Or, Cabinet of Entertainment and Instruction. 1827
- Historic Tales of Illustrious British Children. 1833
- Tales of the School Room. 1835
- Tales and Stories From History. 1836
- Alda, the British Captive. 1841

== Sources ==
Attribution

- "Strickland, Agnes" . Dictionary of National Biography. London: Smith, Elder & Co. 1885–1900.
- Cooper, Ernest R. (1946). "Agnes Strickland and her birth-place" (PDF). Proceedings of the Suffolk Institute of Archaeology & History. 24 (1): 33–35.
- Kunitz, Stanley J., ed. (1936). "Strickland, Agnes". British Authors of the Nineteenth Century. New York: H. W. Wilson Company.
- Maitzen, Rohan (1995). "This feminine preserve: historical biographies by Victorian women". Victorian Studies. 38 (3): 371–393.
- Mitchell, Rosemary (2004). "Strickland, Agnes (1796–1874)". Oxford Dictionary of National Biography (online ed.). Oxford University Press. doi:10.1093/ref:odnb/26663. (Subscription, Wikipedia Library access or UK public library membership required.)
- Pope-Hennessy, Una (1940). Agnes Strickland: biographer of the queens of England, 1796–1874. London: Chatto & Windus.
- Strickland, Jane Margaret (1887). Life of Agnes Strickland. Edinburgh: W. Blackwood and Sons.
