= John Wedderburn Dunbar Moodie =

Scottish army officer and farmer

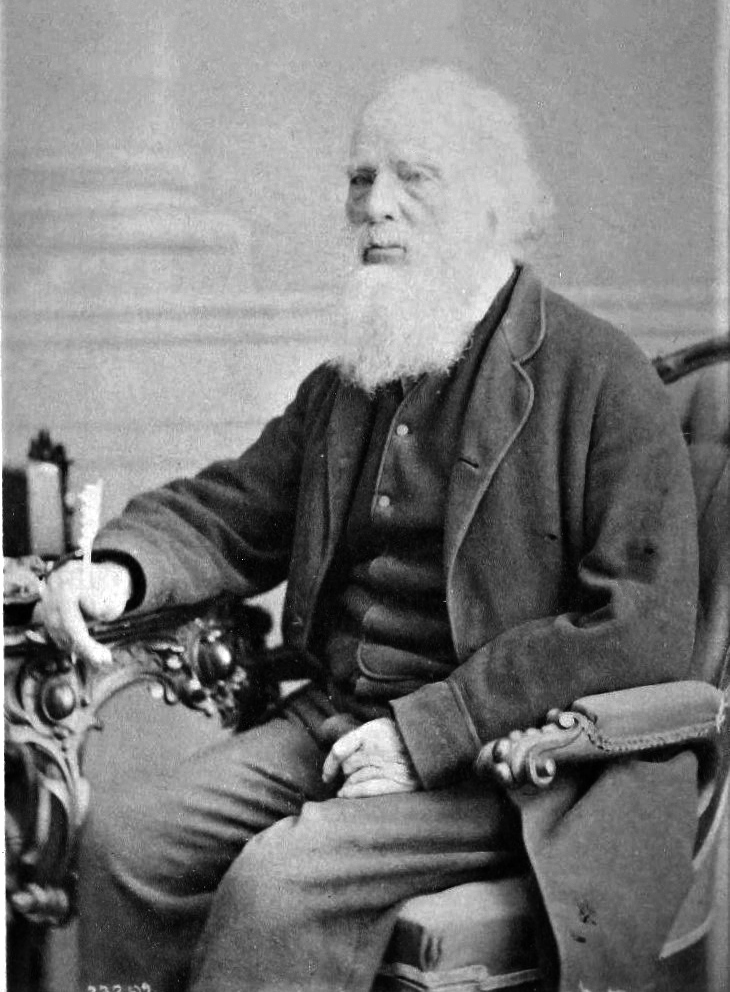
- Born: October 7, 1797; Melsetter, Orkney, Scotland
- Died: October 22, 1869 (aged 72); Belleville, Ontario, Canada
- Spouse: Susanna Strickland (m. 1831)
- Children: 7 (2 of whom died in childhood)

John Wedderburn Dunbar Moodie (October 7, 1797 – October 22, 1869) was a Scottish-born army officer, farmer, civil servant and writer in early Canada.

The son of Major James Moodie, he was born in Melsetter in the Orkney Islands. In 1813, he became a second lieutenant in the 21st Royal North British Fusiliers. He was seriously wounded during an attack on Bergen op Zoom in the Netherlands. He received a military pension for two years and was placed on half-pay in 1816. In 1819, he went to Cape Colony, where his two older brothers Benjamin Moodie and Donald Moodie had settled two years earlier. In 1829, he returned to England. He published an article in the United Service Journal in 1831 and then a book Ten years in South Africa in 1835.

In 1831, he married Susanna Strickland; they came to Canada the following year. They purchased a farm near Coburg in Upper Canada. After encountering difficulties establishing a homestead, they settled in Belleville. Moodie served in the militia during the Upper Canada Rebellion. From November 1839 to January 1863, he served as sheriff for Victoria District. From 1847 to 1848, he contributed to and was editor for the Victoria Magazine. He also published Scenes and adventures, as a soldier and settler, during half a century in 1866 and contributed to his wife's book Roughing it in the bush, or life in Canada.

John Wedderburn Dunbar Moodie died on October 22, 1869, in Belleville at the age of 72.
