= Susanna Moodie =

Canadian writer (1803–1885)

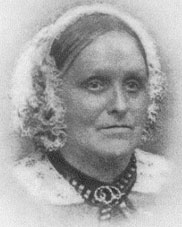
- Born: Susanna Strickland; 6 December 1803; Bungay, River Waveney, Suffolk
- Died: 8 April 1885 (aged 81); Toronto, Ontario
- Occupation: Author
- Spouse: John Wedderburn Dunbar Moodie (m. 1831; died 1869)
- Children: 7 (2 of whom died in childhood)

Susanna Moodie (née Strickland; 6 December 1803 – 8 April 1885) was an English-born Canadian writer who wrote about her experiences as a settler in Canada, which was a British colony at the time.

== Family ==
Susanna Moodie was born Susanna Strickland in Bungay, on the River Waveney in Suffolk. She was the youngest sister in a family of writers, including Agnes Strickland, Jane Margaret Strickland, and Catharine Parr Traill.

== Early career ==
She wrote her first children's book in 1822 and published other children's stories in London, including books about Spartacus and Jugurtha. In London she was also involved in the abolitionist organization Anti-Slavery Society, transcribing the narrative of the former Caribbean slave Mary Prince.

== Marriage and move to Upper Canada ==
On 4 April 1831, she married John Wedderburn Dunbar Moodie, a British army officer and writer. They two had met through their friend Thomas Pringle, a writer who had campaigned against slavery.

John had fought in the Napoleonic Wars and had received reduced military pay since leaving active service in 1816. The couple lived in Southwold, Suffolk, before moving to Upper Canada with their infant daughter in 1832.

The Moodies bought a farm near Cobourg in October 1832. Two years later, in the spring of 1834, they moved to uncleared land in Douro Township, near Peterborough. The second move was to be closer to Susanna's sister Catharine Parr Traill and her brother Samuel Strickland.

The family struggled with farming and money during their years in the backwoods. John later served in the colonial militia during the Upper Canada Rebellion. In November 1839, he was appointed sheriff of the Victoria District after Susanna petitioned Lieutenant Governor Sir George Arthur on his behalf.

As a middle-class Englishwoman, Moodie did not particularly enjoy "the bush", as she called it. The family moved to Belleville in 1840, which she referred to as "the clearings" bringing their years as backwoods settlers to an end.

Moodie continued to write in Canada, and her letters and journals contain valuable information about life in the colony. She observed life in what was then the backwoods of Ontario, including native customs, the climate, the wildlife, relations between the Canadian population and recent American settlers, and the strong sense of community and the communal work, known as "bees" (which she, incidentally, hated).

She studied the Family Compact and became sympathetic to the moderate reformers led by Robert Baldwin, while remaining critical of radical reformers such as William Lyon Mackenzie. This caused problems for her husband, who shared her views, but, as sheriff of Belleville, had to work with members and supporters of the Family Compact.

== Writing career ==
=== Early writing ===
Susanna Moodie came from a writing family with a prolific output similar to that of the Bronte, Edgeworth, and Trollope families. Several of the sisters made careers as authors, including Agnes Strickland, Elizabeth Strickland, Catharine Parr Traill, and Jane Margaret Strickland. Agnes and Elizabeth became well known for their long series of royal biographies.

Catharine Parr Traill and Jane Margaret Strickland wrote stories, natural history, and other popular works, and their brother Samuel Strickland later published his own book about life in Canada.

The Strickland children grew up at Reydon Hall, a large house with a well-stocked library, and their parents educated them at home. They studied literature, history, languages, and practical subjects.

When their father died in 1818 and money became tight, the younger daughters, including Susanna, helped support the family by writing for publications open to women at the time. These included children's books, ladies' magazines, and annual gift books, which paid modestly but reliably.

Moodie published her first children's book in 1822, and went on to write stories about figures such as Spartacus and Jugurtha. She also contributed regularly to periodicals aimed at female readers. Her sisters published biographical sketches of royal women in magazines such as the Lady's Magazine and Museum and the Court Magazine, while Moodie's own rural sketches appeared in La Belle Assemblee in 1827–28. These early scenes of Suffolk life later became the model for her Canadian sketches.

=== Abolitionist and humanitarian writing ===
While living in London, Moodie became connected with the Anti-Slavery Society through its secretary, Thomas Pringle. She sent him poems and stories for the annual Friendship's Offering, a gift book he edited. They began a correspondence and eventually became friends, visiting his home in Hampstead. It was there that she met formerly enslaved people from the West Indies.

Those encounters inspired her to pursue anti-slavery work. In 1831 she published two tracts: The History of Mary Prince and Negro Slavery Described by a Negro. The second opened with her own account of waking up to the realities of slavery and social injustice. At the same time, she was writing reviews for Pringle and publishing poetry in popular annuals like Forget Me Not and Friendship's Offering.

=== Poetry ===
Moodie also wrote poetry, which was a constant throughout her early literary career. She and her sister Agnes published Patriotic Songs in 1830, and in 1831 Moodie published Enthusiasm; and Other Poems, a 214-page collection containing both previously published and new poems.

Her early poems show her deeply held religious beliefs. Enthusiasm is shaped around a narrator who wants readers to reflect and reconsider their values. The collection includes several with weighty messages, such as "The Deluge", "The Avenger of Blood", and "The Destruction of Babylon". The title poem drives the message home, declaring that most everyday passions fade, while steady faith and spiritual discipline provide something lasting.

At the same time, it is clear from her work that she takes pleasure in nature and the reflection it inspires. Her own deep feelings, her interest in visionary themes and her writing style, which shares stylistic patterns of Lord Byron, show that she shared certain traits with Romantic-era writers.

The collection also contains poems addressing slavery, including "An Appeal to the Free". Her poetry appeared in English and Canadian periodicals throughout the 1830s.

=== Settlement memoirs and Canadian nonfiction ===
After arriving in Upper Canada in 1832, Moodie kept writing steadily. She sent poetry and short prose to publishers in England and North America and placed early pieces in the Canadian Literary Magazine in 1833 and the New York Albion in 1835. In 1838 she was invited to write for the Literary Garland and soon became one of its main contributors. She published both poems and a set of short Canadian sketches. These sketches were brief, scene-by-scene pieces that described people she met, situations she witnessed, and local events. They later became the starting point for her memoir Roughing It in the Bush.

Her journals and letters added even more material. They recorded what she saw in Douro Township and later in Belleville. These writings grew into her three major nonfiction books. She published Roughing It in the Bush in 1852. She followed it in 1853 with Life in the Clearings Versus the Bush, which focused on her years in Belleville. She also produced Life in the Backwoods, a sequel that extended the story of her time as a new settler.

Together, these books cover the entire experience of leaving England, arriving in Canada, and trying to build a life in a new place. Roughing It in the Bush, her best-known work, grew out of her publisher's suggestion that she write a guide for British emigrants.

She chose a different path. Instead of promoting the colony, she wrote honestly about the hardships she faced, warning readers that Canada was no Eden, as many in her home country had been led to believe. She said her goal was not to scare away potential newcomers, but rather to prepare those with comfortable backgrounds and no farm experience for the possibility that reality might be very different than their expectations.

"God forbid that any representations of mine should deter one of my countrymen from making this noble and prosperous colony his future home. But let him leave to the hardy labourer the place assigned to him by Providence, nor undertake, upon limited means, the task of pioneer in the great wilderness." – Introduction, Life in the Clearings Versus The Bush (1853)

Readers in the 19th century praised Roughing It in the Bush for its sharp portraits of settlers, its descriptions of rural customs and household routines, and its attention to the natural environment. The book has remained important in Canadian literary studies and has been read as history, as early realism, as local-colour writing, and as part of the Romantic tradition.

Life in the Clearings Versus the Bush was also written at the request of her publisher. The book shifts away from the backwoods world of Roughing It and looks closely at life in growing towns. It includes Moodie's observations on local institutions, public life, and everyday social habits at a time when the province was adjusting to a more stable, self-governing system.

=== Fiction ===
Alongside her nonfiction, Moodie wrote a large amount of fiction. Some of her early prose from England was later expanded and published in serialized form in the Literary Garland before appearing as full-length novels. For example, "The Miser and His Son" became Mark Hurdlestone in 1853, and "Jane Redgrave" and "The Doctor Distressed" were reworked into Matrimonial Speculations in 1854. Her other novels include Flora Lyndsay, Geoffrey Moncton, and The World Before Them.

Much of her fiction writing is set in England and the stories often follow the same themes that run through her other work. Characters face moral tests. There are plots involving miserliness, illegitimacy, crime, and long stretches of hardship. The endings usually follow the pattern common in nineteenth century fiction, with vice punished and virtue rewarded.

From 1847 to 1848, Moodie and her husband edited and wrote most of the content for the Victoria Magazine, a short-lived publication aimed at mechanics and tradesmen. It had about 475 subscribers.

=== Publication history and later career ===
Between 1852 and 1854, Moodie built a relationship with the London publisher Richard Bentley. She contributed short pieces to Bentley's Miscellany and brought out six books through his firm in just three years.

These included Roughing It in the Bush (1852), Life in the Clearings Versus the Bush (1853), and Flora Lyndsay (1854), along with three more titles set in England that expanded earlier work she had published in North American periodicals.

Her publishing agreements with Bentley varied, ranging from outright sales of copyright to half-profit arrangements. She also negotiated American editions with publishers such as G. P. Putnam and the firm of Dewitt and Davenport. Her books continued to appear in the United States from the early 1850s through the 1880s.

Her writing slowed down after the early 1850s. When her husband retired in 1863 and the family's finances tightened, she attempted to renew her connection with Bentley. Only one new book came out of this effort: The World Before Them in 1868.

During these lean years, she added to the household income by painting and selling small flower pictures. Moodie lived near Belleville until her husband's death in 1869, then moved between Seaforth and Toronto, with some periods boarding in Belleville. Her writing during this time was occasional, and she did not publish any major works after 1868.

== Family legacy in illustration ==
Moodie taught her daughter Agnes how to paint flowers. Agnes later illustrated Canadian Wild Flowers, published in 1868.

== Death ==
She died in Toronto, Ontario on 8 April 1885 and is buried in Belleville Cemetery.

== Recognition ==
Moodie's books and poetry inspired Margaret Atwood's collection of poetry, The Journals of Susanna Moodie, published in 1970. It was also an important influence on one of Atwood's later novels, Alias Grace, based on an account of murder convict Grace Marks which appeared in Life in the Clearings Versus the Bush. She has also been a source of inspiration for Carol Shields, who published a critical analysis of Moodie's work, Susanna Moodie: Voice and Vision. Additionally, the central character of Shields' novel, Small Ceremonies, is working on a biography of Moodie.

=== Commemorative postage stamp ===
On 8 September 2003, to commemorate the 50th anniversary of the National Library of Canada, Canada Post released a special commemorative series, "The Writers of Canada", with a design by Katalina Kovats, featuring two English-Canadian and two French-Canadian stamps. Three million stamps were issued. Moodie and her sister Catherine Parr Traill were featured on one of the English-Canadian stamps.

== Bibliography ==
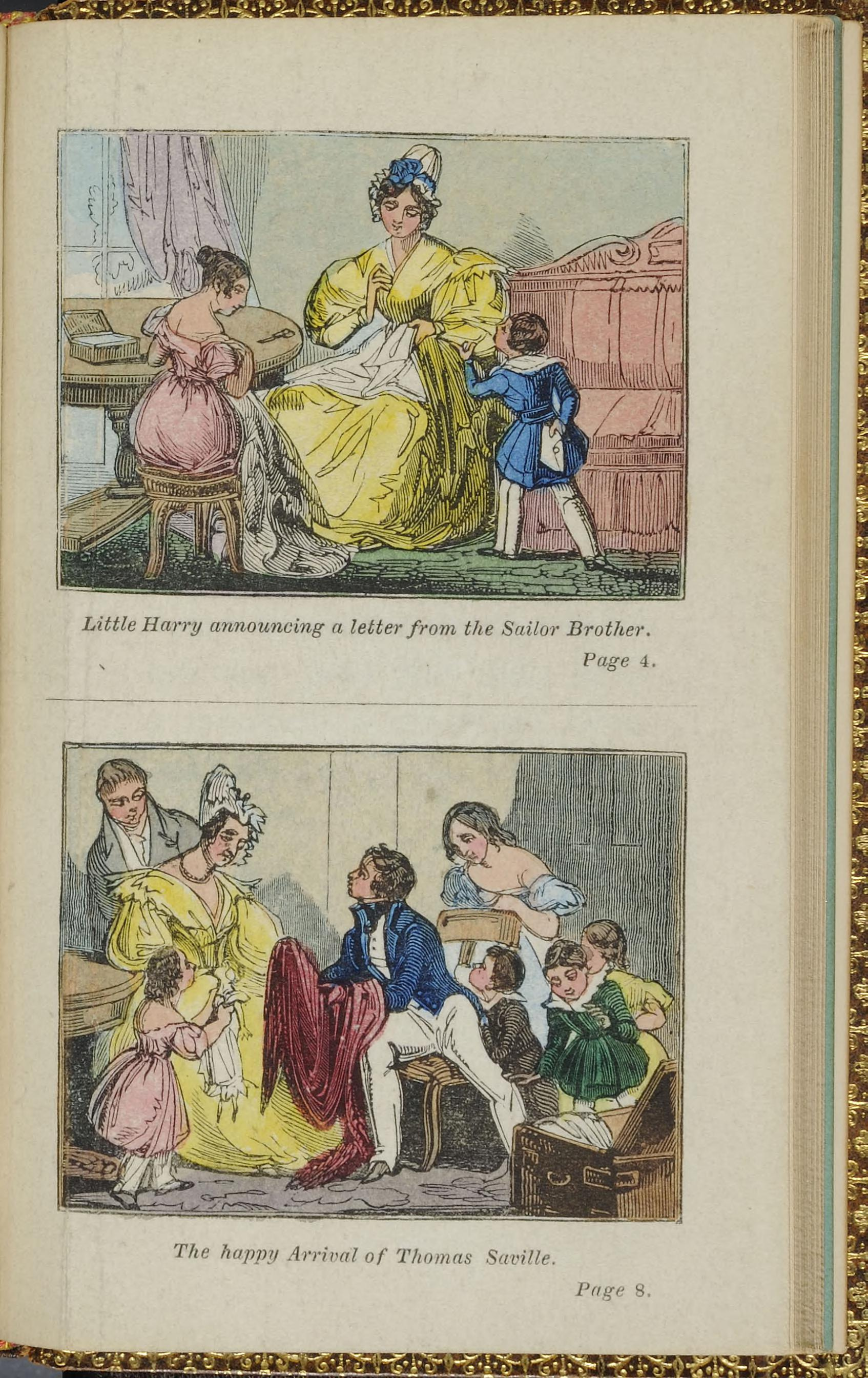
The sailor brother

=== Novels ===
- Mark Hurdlestone – 1853
- Flora Lyndsay – 1854
- Matrimonial Speculations – 1854
- Geoffrey Moncton – 1855
- The World Before Them – 1868

=== Poetry ===
- Patriotic Songs – 1830 (with Agnes Strickland)
- Enthusiasm and Other Poems – 1831

=== Children's books ===
- Spartacus – 1822
- The Little Quaker
- The Sailor Brother
- The Little Prisoner
- Hugh Latimer – 1828
- Rowland Massingham
- Profession and Principle
- George Leatrim – 1875

=== Memoirs ===
- Roughing it in the Bush – 1852
- Life in the Backwoods; A Sequel to Roughing It in the Bush
- Life in the Clearings versus the Bush – 1853

=== Letters ===
- Letters of a Lifetime – 1985 (edited by Carl Ballstadt, Elizabeth Hopkins, and Michael Peterman)
