= Catharine Parr Traill =

English-Canadian author and botanical artist

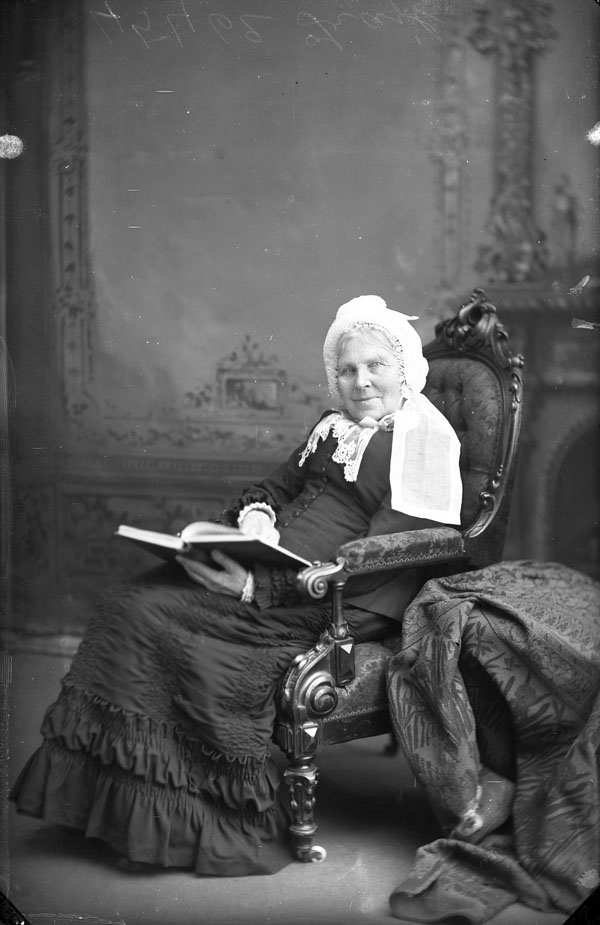
- Catharine Parr Traill, Canadian settler and author
- Born: Catharine Parr Strickland; 9 January 1802; Southwark, England
- Died: 29 August 1899 (aged 97); Lakefield, Ontario, Canada
- Occupations: Author, naturalist
- Writing career
- Genres: Children's and Settler Literature

Catharine Parr Traill (born Strickland; 9 January 1802 – 29 August 1899) was an English-Canadian author and naturalist who wrote about life in Canada, particularly what is now Ontario (then the colony of Upper Canada). In the 1830s, Canada covered an area considerably smaller than today. At the time, most of Upper Canada had not been explored by European settlers.

Throughout her long life, Traill wrote to generate income in support of her family. She wrote 24 books covering topics ranging from her life as a settler in Ontario to natural history, especially botany. Traill is considered a pioneer of Canada's natural history. Through her writing, she related the colonial experience and described the natural environment of Upper Canada for English readers.

Traill is considered an amateur botanist, because at the time, it was not possible for women to hold professional, paid positions.

== Early years ==
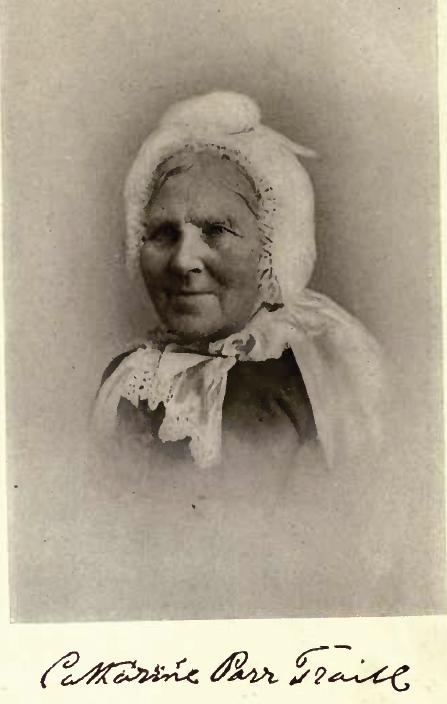
Mrs Catharine Parr Traill by William James Topley

Catharine Parr Strickland was born in the district of Rotherhithe in Southwark (then in Surrey, today part of Greater London) in 1802, fifth child out of eight, of Thomas Strickland and Elizabeth Homer. Catharine had four older sisters - Elizabeth, Agnes, Sarah and Jane Margaret - and a younger sister, Susanna, as well as two younger brothers, Samuel and Thomas.

Traill's father retired from his position as manager of the Greenland Docks on the River Thames and moved the family to the countryside in Suffolk, shortly after her birth. She grew up in East Anglia, first near Bungay, and later Southwold and was educated at home. After Thomas Strickland died in 1818, Catharine and her sisters turned to writing and editorial work as the main source of family income.

== Career ==
Sister to fellow authors Agnes Strickland, Jane Margaret Strickland, Susanna Moodie, and Elisabeth Strickland, Traill was the first of her siblings to commence writing. She began writing children's books in 1818 after the death of her father. Traill's first book The tell tale: an original collection of moral and amusing stories appeared anonymously in 1818; she was only 16. Her early works, such as Disobedience, or Mind What Mama Says (1819) and "Happy Because Good", were written for children, and often dwell on the benefits of obedience to one's parents. A prolific author, until her marriage she averaged one book per year. In 1832, she married Lieutenant Thomas Traill, a retired officer of the Napoleonic Wars and a friend of her sister's husband, John Moodie, despite objections from her family (aside from Susanna). Soon after their marriage, they left for Upper Canada, settling near Peterborough, where her brother Samuel was a surveyor. Her sister, Mrs. Susanna Moodie, emigrated soon afterwards.

Traill described her new life in letters and journals and collected these into The Backwoods of Canada (1836), which continues to be read as an important source of information about early Canada. She describes everyday life in the community, the relationship between Canadians, Americans, and Indigenous peoples, the climate, and local flora and fauna.

Agnes Chamberlin's watercolour painting for Studies of Plant Life in Canada, by Catherine Parr Traill

Traill included further observations in a novel, Canadian Crusoes (1851). She also collected information about the skills necessary for a new settler, published in The Female Emigrant's Guide (1854), later retitled The Canadian Settler's Guide. She wrote "Pearls and Pebbles" and "Cot and Cradle Stories".

After the depression of 1836, Traill's husband Thomas joined the militia in 1837 to fight against the Upper Canada Rebellion. In 1840, dissatisfied with life in "the backwoods," both the Traills and the Moodies moved to the city of Belleville, Ontario. While Susanna was more concerned with the differences between rural and urban life, Catharine spent her years in Belleville writing about the natural environment. She often sketched the plant life of Upper Canada, publishing Canadian Wild Flowers (1868), Studies of Plant Life in Canada (1885) and "Rambles in the Canadian Forest".

She received a grant c. 1899 from the Royal Bounty Fund, which was supplemented by a subscription from her friends in Canada, headed by Sir Sandford Fleming. She died at her residence, "Westove," in Lakefield, Ontario on 28 August 1899.

Her many albums of plant collections are housed in the National Herbarium of Canada at the Canadian Museum of Nature.

=== Recognition ===
Trent University, in Peterborough, Ontario, named their downtown campus after her. Catharine Parr Traill College is the university's main college for graduate studies.

=== Commemorative postage stamp ===
On 8 September 2003, to commemorate the 50th anniversary of the National Library of Canada, Canada Post released a special commemorative series, "The Writers of Canada", designed by Katalina Kovats and featuring two English-Canadian and two French-Canadian stamps. Three million stamps were issued. Traill and her sister Susanna Moodie were featured on one of the English-Canadian stamps.

== Selected bibliography ==
- The Tell Tale – 1818
- Disobedience – 1819
- Reformation – 1819
- Nursery Fables – 1821
- Little Downy – 1822
- The Flower-Basket – 1825
- Prejudice Reproved – 1826
- The Young Emigrants – 1826
- The Juvenile Forget-Me-Not – 1827
- The Step Brothers – 1828
- The Keepsake Guineas – 1828
- Amendment – 1828
- Sketches from Nature – 1830
- Sketch Book of a Young Naturalist – 1831
- Narratives of Nature – 1831
- The Backwoods of Canada – 1836
- Canadian Crusoes – 1852
- The Female Emigrant's Guide – 1854
- Lady Mary and Her Nurse – 1856
- Canadian Wild Flowers – 1868, with illustrations by Agnes Dunbar Moodie Fitzgibbon
- Afar in the Forest; or, Pictures of Life and Scenery in the Wilds of Canada – 1869
- Studies of plant life in Canada, or, Gleanings from forest, lake and plain – 1885
- Pearls and Pebbles or Notes of an Old Naturalist – 1894
- Traill, Catherine Parr Strickland, (1996). I bless you in my heart : selected correspondence of Catharine Parr Traill. Ballstadt, Carl, 1931-, Hopkins, Elizabeth, BA., Peterman, Michael A., 1942-. Toronto: University of Toronto Press. p. 3. ISBN 0802008372. OCLC 36640963.
- Cot and Cradle Stories – 1895
