= Mobile network codes in ITU region 7xx (South America) =

This list contains the mobile country codes and mobile network codes for networks with country codes between 700 and 799, inclusively – a region that covers South and Central America. The Falkland Islands are included in this region, while the Caribbean is listed under Mobile Network Codes in ITU region 3xx (North America).

== National operators ==
=== A ===
==== Argentina – AR ====
MCC	MNC	Brand	Operator	Status	Bands (MHz)	References and notes
722	01	Tuenti	Telefónica Móviles Argentina S.A.	Operational	Unknown	
722	07	Movistar	Telefónica Móviles Argentina S.A.	Operational	Unknown	
722	010	Movistar & Tuenti	Telefónica Móviles Argentina S.A.	Operational	GSM 850 / GSM 1900 / UMTS 850 / UMTS 1900 / LTE 700 / LTE 1700 / LTE 2600 / 5G 3500	
722	020	Nextel	NII Holdings	Not operational	iDEN 800	Shut down June 2019
722	034	Personal	Telecom Personal S.A.	Operational	Unknown	
722	040	Globalstar	TE.SA.M Argentina S.A.	Operational	Unknown	
722	070	Movistar	Telefónica Móviles Argentina S.A.	Operational	GSM 1900	Also uses or had used MNC 07
722	210	IMOWI	Cámara de Cooperativas de Telecomunicaciones (CATEL)	Operational	LTE	Roams on Movistar
722	310	Claro	AMX Argentina S.A.	Operational	GSM 1900	
722	320	Claro	AMX Argentina S.A.	Operational	GSM 850 / GSM 1900 / UMTS 850 / UMTS 1900 / LTE 1700 / 5G 3500	
722	330	Claro	AMX Argentina S.A.	Operational	GSM 850 / GSM 1900 / UMTS 850 / UMTS 1900 / LTE 1700 / 5G 3500	
722	340	Personal	Telecom Personal S.A.	Operational	Unknown	
722	341	Personal	Telecom Personal S.A.	Operational	GSM 850 / GSM 1900 / UMTS 850 / UMTS 1900 / LTE 700 / LTE 1700 / LTE 2600 / 5G 700 / 5G 2600 / 5G 3500	LTE bands 28 / 4 / 7
722	350	PORT-HABLE	Hutchison Telecommunications Argentina S.A.	Not operational	GSM 900	Acquired by Claro

=== B ===
==== Belize – BZ ====
MCC	MNC	Brand	Operator	Status	Bands (MHz)	References and notes
702	67	DigiCell	Belize Telemedia Limited (BTL)	Operational	GSM 850 / GSM 1900 / UMTS 850 / UMTS 1900 / LTE 700 / LTE 1900	LTE bands 17 / 2
702	68	INTELCO	International Telecommunications Ltd.	Not operational	Unknown	MNC withdrawn
702	69	SMART	Speednet Communications Limited	Operational	CDMA2000 850 / UMTS 850 / LTE 700	LTE band 13
702	99	SMART	Speednet Communications Limited	Operational	CDMA2000 850	

==== Bolivia – BO ====
MCC	MNC	Brand	Operator	Status	Bands (MHz)	References and notes
736	01	Viva	Nuevatel PCS De Bolivia SA	Operational	GSM 1900 / UMTS 1900 / LTE 1700	
736	02	Entel	Entel SA	Operational	GSM 850 / GSM 1900 / UMTS 850 / LTE 700 / 5G 3500	
736	03	Tigo	Telefónica Celular De Bolivia S.A	Operational	GSM 850 / UMTS 850 / UMTS 1900 / LTE 700	Aka. Telecel Bolivia

==== Brazil – BR ====
MCC	MNC	Brand	Operator	Status	Bands (MHz)	References and notes
724	00	Nextel	NII Holdings, Inc.	Not Operational	iDEN 850	Defunct since March 2018
724	01		SISTEER DO BRASIL TELECOMUNICAÇÔES	Not Operational	MVNO	Through Vivo S.A. network
724	02	TIM	Telecom Italia Mobile	Operational	GSM 900 / GSM 1800 / UMTS 850 / UMTS 900 / UMTS 2100 / LTE 700 / LTE 1800 / LTE 2100 / LTE 2600 / 5G 700 / 5G 1800 / 5G 2300 / 5G 2600 / 5G 3500	
724	03	TIM	Telecom Italia Mobile	Operational	GSM 900 / GSM 1800 / UMTS 850 / UMTS 900 / UMTS 2100 / LTE 700 / LTE 1800 / LTE 2100 / LTE 2600 / 5G 700 / 5G 1800 / 5G 2300 / 5G 2600 / 5G 3500	
724	04	TIM	Telecom Italia Mobile	Operational	GSM 900 / GSM 1800 / UMTS 850 / UMTS 900 / UMTS 2100 / LTE 700 / LTE 1800 / LTE 2100 / LTE 2600 / 5G 700 / 5G 1800 / 5G 2300 / 5G 2600 / 5G 3500	
724	05	Claro	Claro	Operational	GSM 900 / GSM 1800 / UMTS 850 / UMTS 2100 / LTE 700 / LTE 1800 / LTE 2600 / 5G 2300 / 5G 2600 / 5G 3500	
724	06	Vivo	Telefônica Brasil S.A.	Operational	GSM 850 / GSM 1800 / UMTS 850 / UMTS 2100 / LTE 700 / LTE 1800 / LTE 2600 / 5G 700 / 5G 1800 / 5G 2300 / 5G 2600 / 5G 3500	
724	10	Vivo	Telefônica Brasil S.A.	Operational	GSM 850 / GSM 1800 / UMTS 850 / UMTS 2100 / LTE 700 / LTE 1800 / LTE 2600 / 5G 700 / 5G 1800 / 5G 2300 / 5G 2600 / 5G 3500	
724	11	Vivo	Telefônica Brasil S.A.	Operational	GSM 850 / GSM 1800 / UMTS 850 / UMTS 2100 / LTE 700 / LTE 1800 / LTE 2600 / 5G 700 / 5G 1800 / 5G 2300 / 5G 2600 / 5G 3500	
724	12	Claro	Claro	Unknown	Unknown	Unknown
724	13	NLT	NLT Telecom	Operational	MVNO	
724	15	Sercomtel	Sercomtel Celular	Operational	GSM 900 / GSM 1800 / UMTS 850	
724	16	Brasil Telecom GSM	Brasil Telecom GSM	Not operational	GSM 1800 / UMTS 2100	acquired by Oi, MNC used for existing Brasil Telecom SIM Cards only
724	17	Surf Telecom	Correios Celular^{[pt]}	Operational	MVNO	Through TIM network
724	18	datora	Datora (Vodafone)	Operational	MVNO	Through TIM network
724	21	LIGUE	Ligue Telecom	Operational	LTE 2600	
724	23	Vivo	Telefônica Brasil S.A.	Operational	GSM 850 / GSM 1800 / UMTS 850 / UMTS 2100 / LTE 1800 / LTE 2600	formerly used by the acquired Telemig Celular
724	24		Amazonia Celular	Unknown	Unknown	acquired by Oi
724	28	No name		Operational	Unknown	Used for RanSharing control and roaming between Vivo and Claro
724	29	Unifique	Unifique Telecomunicações S/A	Operational	5G 700 / 5G 3500	
724	30	Oi	TNL PCS Oi	Not operational	Unknown	Liquidated Apr 2022
724	31	Oi	TNL PCS Oi	Not operational	GSM 1800 / UMTS 2100 / LTE 1800 / LTE 2100 / LTE 2600 / 5G 2100	Liquidated Apr 2022
724	32	Algar Telecom	Algar Telecom S.A.	Operational	GSM 900 / GSM 1800 / UMTS 2100 / LTE 700 / LTE 1800 / LTE 2300 / 5G 2300	LTE bands 28 / 3 / 40
724	33	Algar Telecom	Algar Telecom S.A.	Operational	GSM 900 / GSM 1800 / UMTS 2100 / LTE 700 / LTE 1800 / LTE 2300 / 5G 2300	
724	34	Algar Telecom	Algar Telecom S.A.	Operational	GSM 900 / GSM 1800 / UMTS 2100 / LTE 700 / LTE 1800 / LTE 2300 / 5G 2300	
724	35		Telcom Telecomunicações	Unknown	Unknown	
724	36		Options Telecomunicações	Not Operational	MVNO	
724	37	aeiou	Unicel	Not operational	Unknown	Bankruptcy in 2011
724	38	Claro	Claro	Operational	GSM 1900	Inherited from the old Vesper's WLL licenses. In use for fixed wireless phones.
724	39	Nextel	NII Holdings, Inc.	Not Operational	UMTS 2100 / LTE 1800 / LTE 2100	Merged with Claro in 2020
724	40	Telecall	Telexperts Telecomunicações S.A	Operational	MVNO	
724	54	Conecta	PORTO SEGURO TELECOMUNICAÇÔES	Not Operational	MVNO	Defunct since 2018, clients were transferred to TIM.
724	99	Local		Operational	Unknown	Used for RanSharing control and roaming between TIM and Oi

=== C ===
==== Chile – CL ====
MCC	MNC	Brand	Operator	Status	Bands (MHz)	References and notes
730	01	Entel	Entel Telefonía Móvil S.A.	Operational	GSM 850 / GSM 1900 / UMTS 1900 / LTE 700 / LTE 1900 / LTE 2600 / 5G 3500	
730	02	Movistar	Telefónica Móvil de Chile	Operational	GSM 850 / GSM 1900 / UMTS 850 / UMTS 1900 / LTE 700 / LTE 1900 / LTE 2600 / 5G 3500	
730	03	Claro	Claro Chile S.A.	Operational	GSM 850 / GSM 1900 / UMTS 1700 / UMTS 1900 / LTE 700 / LTE 850 / LTE 1700 / LTE 1900 / LTE 2600 / 5G 3500	
730	04	WOM	Novator Partners	Not operational	iDEN 800	Former Nextel
730	05		Multikom S.A.	Unknown	Unknown	
730	06	Telsur	Blue Two Chile S.A.	Operational	MVNO	
730	07	Movistar	Telefónica Móvil de Chile	Unknown	Unknown	
730	08	VTR Móvil	VTR S.A.	Operational	MVNO	Uses Claro as main network; Roaming with WOM
730	09	WOM	Novator Partners	Operational	UMTS 1700 / LTE 1700 / 5G 3500	Former Nextel; Roaming with Movistar and Claro (GSM/UMTS/LTE)
730	10	Entel	Entel Telefonía Móvil S.A.	Operational	LTE 3500	Wireless local loop
730	11		Celupago S.A.	Unknown	Unknown	
730	12	Colo-Colo Móvil; Wanderers Móvil	Telestar Móvil S.A.	Not operational	MVNO	Uses Movistar
730	13	Virgin Mobile	Tribe Mobile Chile SPA	Operational	MVNO	Uses Movistar
730	14		Netline Telefónica Móvil Ltda	Unknown	Unknown	
730	15		Cibeles Telecom S.A.	Unknown	MVNO	
730	16		Nomade Telecomunicaciones S.A.	Unknown	MVNO	
730	17		COMPATEL Chile Limitada	Unknown	Unknown	
730	18		Empresas Bunker S.A.	Unknown	Unknown	
730	19	móvil Falabella	Sociedad Falabella Móvil SPA	Not operational	MVNO	MNC withdrawn
730	20		Inversiones Santa Fe Limitada	Unknown	Unknown	
730	21	Entel	WILL S.A.	Operational	Unknown	
730	22		Cellplus SpA	Unknown	Unknown	
730	23	Claro	Claro Servicios Empresariales S. A.	Operational	Unknown	
730	24	Claro	Claro Chile SpA	Operational	Unknown	
730	26	Entel	WILL S.A.	Operational	Unknown	
730	27		Cibeles Telecom S.A.	Unknown	MVNO	
730	28		Airtime Chile S.p.A.	Unknown	MVNO	
730	29	Movistar	Telefónica Móviles Chile	Operational	LTE 1900	Used for Satellite Direct to Cell on Band 2; former Entel PCS
730	30	Movistar	Telefónica Móviles Chile	Unknown	Unknown	
730	31	Entel	Entel PCS Telecomunicaciones S.A.	Unknown	Unknown	
730	32	Entel	Entel PCS Telecomunicaciones S.A.	Unknown	Unknown	
730	33	Claro	Claro Chile SpA	Unknown	Unknown	
730	99	Will	WILL Telefonía	Operational	GSM 1900 / UMTS 1900	Wireless local loop

==== Colombia – CO ====
MCC	MNC	Brand	Operator	Status	Bands (MHz)	References and notes
732	001	Movistar	Colombia Telecomunicaciones S.A. ESP	Operational	Unknown	
732	002	Edatel	Edatel S.A. ESP	Unknown	Unknown	Fixed wireless
732	003		LLEIDA S.A.S.	Not operational	Unknown	MNC withdrawn
732	004		COMPATEL COLOMBIA SAS	Not operational	Unknown	MNC withdrawn
732	020	Tigo	Une EPM Telecomunicaciones S.A. E.S.P.	Not operational	LTE 2600	Former Une-EPM, Emtelsa; merged with Tigo; MNC withdrawn
732	099	EMCALI	Empresas Municipales de Cali	Not operational	GSM 900	Fixed wireless; MNC withdrawn
732	100	Claro	Comunicacion Celular S.A. (Comcel)	Unknown	Unknown	
732	101	Claro	Comunicacion Celular S.A. (Comcel)	Operational	UMTS 850 / UMTS 1900 / LTE 1700 / LTE 2600 / 5G 3500	GSM shut down Feb 2023
732	102		Bellsouth Colombia	Not operational	GSM 850 / GSM 1900 / CDMA 850	Network acquired by Movistar; MNC withdrawn
732	103	Tigo	Colombia Móvil S.A. ESP	Operational	UMTS 2100 / LTE 700 / LTE 1700 / LTE 2600 / 5G 3500	GSM shut down Nov 2022
732	111	Tigo	Colombia Móvil S.A. ESP	Operational	UMTS 2100 / LTE 700 / LTE 1700 / LTE 2600 / 5G 3500	GSM shut down Nov 2022
732	123	Movistar	Colombia Telecomunicaciones S.A. ESP	Operational	GSM 850 / GSM 1900 / UMTS 850 / UMTS 1900 / LTE 850 / LTE 1700 / LTE 1900 / 5G 3500	CDMA shut down
732	124	Movistar	Colombia Telecomunicaciones S.A. ESP	Unknown	Unknown	
732	130	AVANTEL	Avantel S.A.S	Not operational	UMTS 1700 / LTE 1700	owned by Novator Partners; iDEN shut down in 2021; MNC withdrawn
732	142		Une EPM Telecomunicaciones S.A. E.S.P.	Unknown	Unknown	
732	154	Virgin Mobile	Virgin Mobile Colombia S.A.S.	Operational	MVNO	Uses Movistar
732	157	Móvil Éxito	Almacenes Éxito Inversiones S.A.S.	Operational	MVNO	
732	165		Colombia Móvil S.A. ESP	Unknown	Unknown	
732	176		DirecTV Colombia Ltda	Not operational	LTE 2600 / TD-5G 2600	Fixed wireless; acquired by Movistar; MNC withdrawn
732	187	eTb	Empresa de Telecomunicaciones de Bogotá S.A. ESP	Operational	LTE 1700	
732	199		SUMA Movil SAS	Unknown	Unknown	
732	208		UFF Movil SAS	Not operational	LTE 1700	MNC withdrawn
732	210		Hablame Colombia SAS ESP	Not operational	Unknown	MNC withdrawn
732	220		Libre Tecnologias SAS	Unknown	Unknown	
732	230		Setroc Mobile Group SAS	Unknown	MVNO	
732	240		Logistica Flash Colombia SAS	Not operational	Unknown	MNC withdrawn
732	250		Plintron Colombia SAS	Not operational	Unknown	MNC withdrawn
732	360	WOM	Partners Telecom Colombia SAS	Operational	LTE 700 / LTE 2600	owned by Novator Partners
732	363		Partners Telecom Colombia SAS	Unknown	Unknown	
732	666	Claro	Comunicacion Celular S.A. (Comcel)	Not operational	Unknown	MNC withdrawn

==== Costa Rica – CR ====
MCC	MNC	Brand	Operator	Status	Bands (MHz)	References and notes
712	01	Kölbi ICE	Instituto Costarricense de Electricidad	Operational	GSM 1800 / UMTS 850 / LTE 1800 / LTE 2600	
712	02	Kölbi ICE	Instituto Costarricense de Electricidad	Operational	GSM 1800 / UMTS 850 / LTE 1800 / LTE 2600	
712	03	Claro	Claro CR Telecomunicaciones (Aló)	Operational	GSM 1800 / UMTS 2100 / LTE 1800	
712	04	Liberty	Liberty Latin America	Operational	GSM 1800 / UMTS 850 / UMTS 2100 / LTE 1800	Former Telefónica Móviles Costa Rica
712	07	ring.cr	Ring Centrales de Costa Rica S.A.	Unknown	Unknown	
712	08	Coopelesca	Cooperativa de Electrificación Rural de San Carlos R.L.	Unknown	Unknown	
712	09	Coopesantos	Cooperativa de Electrificación Rural Los Santos R.L.	Unknown	Unknown	
712	10	Coopeguanacaste	Cooperativa de Electrificación Rural de Guanacaste R.L.	Unknown	Unknown	
712	20	RACSA	Radiografica Costarricense S.A.	Unknown	5G	Private networks; former Virtualis/fullmóvil

=== E ===
==== Ecuador – EC ====
MCC	MNC	Brand	Operator	Status	Bands (MHz)	References and notes
740	00	Movistar	Otecel S.A.	Operational	GSM 850 / GSM 1900 / UMTS 850 / LTE 1900	Former BellSouth
740	01	Claro	CONECEL S.A.	Operational	GSM 850 / UMTS 850 / UMTS 1900 / LTE 1700	Former Porta
740	02	CNT Mobile	Corporación Nacional de Telecomunicaciones (CNT EP)	Operational	GSM 1900 / UMTS 1900 / LTE 1700	Former Alegro / Telecsa; CDMA 1900 shut down in 2014
740	03	Tuenti	Otecel S.A.	Operational	MVNO	Runs on Movistar's Network

==== El Salvador – SV ====
MCC	MNC	Brand	Operator	Status	Bands (MHz)	References and notes
706	01	Claro	CTE Telecom Personal, S.A. de C.V.	Operational	GSM 1900 / UMTS 1900	owned by América Móvil
706	02	Digicel	Digicel, S.A. de C.V.	Operational	GSM 900 / UMTS 900	
706	03	Tigo	Telemovil El Salvador S.A.	Operational	GSM 850 / UMTS 850 / LTE 850 / LTE 1700	
706	04	Movistar	Telefónica Móviles El Salvador	Operational	GSM 850 / GSM 1900 / UMTS 850 / UMTS 1900 / LTE 1900	
706	05	RED	INTELFON, S.A. de C.V.	Operational	iDEN	

=== F ===
==== Falkland Islands (United Kingdom) – FK ====
MCC	MNC	Brand	Operator	Status	Bands (MHz)	References and notes
750	001	Sure	Sure South Atlantic Ltd.	Operational	GSM 900 / LTE 1800 / WiMAX 2400 / WiMAX 3500	formerly Cable & Wireless Communications Touch

==== French Guiana (France) – GF ====
MCC	MNC	Brand	Operator	Status	Bands (MHz)	References and notes
340	01	Orange	Orange Caraïbe Mobiles	Operational	GSM 900 / UMTS 2100 / LTE 800 / LTE 1800 / LTE 2100 / LTE 2600 / 5G 3500	French Antilles MCC
340	02	SFR Caraïbe	Outremer Telecom	Operational	GSM 900 / GSM 1800 / UMTS 2100 / LTE 800 / LTE 1800 / LTE 2600 / 5G 3500	French Antilles MCC; former Only
340	11		Guyane Téléphone Mobile	Not operational	Unknown	French Antilles MCC; MNC withdrawn
340	20	Digicel	DIGICEL Antilles Française Guyane	Operational	GSM 900 / UMTS 2100 / LTE 800	French Antilles MCC; former Bouygues Telecom Caraïbes
742	04	Free	Free Caraïbe	Unknown	UMTS 900 / UMTS 2100 / LTE 1800 / LTE 2100 / LTE 2600	

=== G ===
==== Guatemala – GT ====
MCC	MNC	Brand	Operator	Status	Bands (MHz)	References and notes
704	01	Claro	Telecomunicaciones de Guatemala, S.A.	Operational	CDMA 1900 / GSM 900 / UMTS 1900 / LTE 1900 / 5G 3500	former Servicios de Comunicaciones Personales Inalambricas (SERCOM)
704	02	Tigo	Millicom / Local partners	Operational	TDMA 800 / GSM 850 / UMTS 850 / LTE 850 / 5G 3500	former COMCEL
704	03	Claro	Telecomunicaciones de Guatemala, S.A.	Operational	CDMA 1900 / GSM 1900 / UMTS 1900 / LTE 1900	former Movistar
704	04	digicel	Digicel Group	Reserved	GSM 900	
704	05	RED/INTELFON	INTELFON Guatemala	Operational	iDEN 800	INTELFON GUATEMALA owned by INTELFON El Salvador

==== Guyana – GY ====
MCC	MNC	Brand	Operator	Status	Bands (MHz)	References and notes
738	00	E-Networks	E-Networks Inc.	Operational	WiMAX / LTE 700 / 5G	Fixed wireless
738	01	Digicel	U-Mobile (Cellular) Inc.	Operational	GSM 900 / UMTS 850 / LTE 700	
738	002	GT&T Cellink Plus	Guyana Telephone & Telegraph Co.	Operational	GSM 900 / UMTS 850 / LTE 700	LTE band 28
738	003		Quark Communications Inc.	Operational	TD-LTE	
738	040	E-Networks	E-Networks Inc.	Unknown	Unknown	
738	05		eGovernment Unit, Ministry of the Presidency	Unknown	Unknown	

=== H ===
==== Honduras – HN ====
MCC	MNC	Brand	Operator	Status	Bands (MHz)	References and notes
708	001	Claro	Servicios de Comunicaciones de Honduras S.A. de C.V.	Operational	GSM 1900 / UMTS 1900 / LTE 1700	
708	002	Tigo	Celtel	Operational	CDMA 850 / GSM 850 / UMTS 850 / LTE 1700	also uses or has used MNC 02
708	030	Hondutel	Empresa Hondureña de Telecomunicaciones	Operational	GSM 1900 / UMTS 1900	
708	040	Digicel	Digicel de Honduras	Not operational	GSM 1900	Sold to Claro in 2011

=== N ===
==== Nicaragua – NI ====
MCC	MNC	Brand	Operator	Status	Bands (MHz)	References and notes
710	21	Claro	Empresa Nicaragüense de Telecomunicaciones, S.A. (ENITEL) (América Móvil)	Operational	GSM 1900 / UMTS 850 / LTE 1700	
710	300	Tigo	Telefonía Celular de Nicaragua, S.A.	Operational	GSM 850 / GSM 1900 / UMTS 850 / LTE 1900	Former Movistar; CDMA 800, TDMA 800, and NAMPS 800 have been shut down
710	73	Claro	Servicios de Comunicaciones S.A.	Operational	GSM 1900 / UMTS 850	Former SERCOM (Merged with ENITEL in 2004 and became Claro in 2009)

=== P ===
==== Panama – PA ====
MCC	MNC	Brand	Operator	Status	Bands (MHz)	References and notes
714	01	+Móvil	Cable & Wireless Panama S.A.	Operational	GSM 850 / UMTS 850 / LTE 700 / LTE 1900	LTE band 28 / 2
714	02	Tigo	Grupo de Comunicaciones Digitales, S.A.	Operational	UMTS 850 / UMTS 1900 / LTE 700 / LTE 1700 / LTE 1900	Former Movistar, Bell South Corp. (BSC); CDMA 800, TDMA 800 and NAMPS 800 are closed; GSM shut down Jan 2026
714	020	Tigo	Grupo de Comunicaciones Digitales, S.A.	Operational	LTE 700	Former Movistar; GSM shut down Jan 2026
714	03	Claro	América Móvil	Operational	GSM 1900 / UMTS 1900 / LTE 700 / LTE 1900	Being acquired by C&W; LTE bands 28 / 2
714	04	Digicel	Digicel Group	Not operational	GSM 1900 / UMTS 1900 / LTE 700 / LTE 1900	Shut down 2022; MNC withdrawn
714	05	Cable & Wireless	Cable & Wireless Panama S.A.	Unknown	Unknown	

==== Paraguay – PY ====
MCC	MNC	Brand	Operator	Status	Bands (MHz)	References and notes
744	01	VOX	Hola Paraguay S.A.	Operational	GSM 1900 / UMTS 900 / UMTS 1900 / LTE 1700	
744	02	Claro	AMX Paraguay S.A.	Operational	GSM 1900 / UMTS 1900 / LTE 1700	Former Hutchison, Port Hable, CTI Móvil
744	03		Compañia Privada de Comunicaciones S.A.	Unknown	Unknown	
744	04	Tigo	Telefónica Celular Del Paraguay S.A. (Telecel)	Operational	GSM 850 / UMTS 850 / LTE 1700	
744	05	Personal	Núcleo S.A. (TIM)	Operational	GSM 850 / GSM 1900 / UMTS 850 / UMTS 1900 / LTE 1900	
744	06	Copaco	Copaco S.A.	Operational	GSM 1800 / LTE 1700	
744	07		Nubicom Paraguay S.A.	Unknown	5G 3500	

==== Peru – PE ====
MCC	MNC	Brand	Operator	Status	Bands (MHz)	References and notes
716	06	Movistar	Telefónica del Perú S.A.A.	Operational	CDMA2000 850 / GSM 850 / GSM 1900 / UMTS 850 / UMTS 1900 / LTE 700 / LTE 1700 / 5G 3500	
716	07	Entel	Entel Perú S.A.	Operational	iDEN	Former Nextel
716	10	Claro	América Móvil Perú	Operational	GSM 1900 / UMTS 850 / LTE 700 / LTE 1900 / TD-LTE 3500 / 5G 3500 / 5G 39000	Former TIM
716	15	Bitel	Viettel Peru S.A.C.	Operational	GSM 1900 / UMTS 1900 / LTE 900	
716	17	Entel	Entel Perú S.A.	Operational	UMTS 1900 / LTE 1700 / TD-LTE 2300 / 5G 3500	Former Nextel

=== S ===
==== Suriname – SR ====
MCC	MNC	Brand	Operator	Status	Bands (MHz)	References and notes
746	02	Telesur	Telecommunications Company Suriname (Telesur)	Operational	GSM 900 / GSM 1800 / UMTS 2100 / LTE 700 / LTE 1800 / 5G 3700	LTE bands 28, 3
746	03	Digicel	Digicel Group Limited	Operational	GSM 900 / GSM 1800 / UMTS 850 / LTE 1800	
746	04	Digicel	Digicel Group Limited	Not operational	GSM 900 / UMTS	Former Uniqa (Intelsur N.V. / UTS N.V.); MNC withdrawn
746	05	Telesur	Telecommunications Company Suriname (Telesur)	Unknown	CDMA 450	

=== U ===
==== Uruguay – UY ====
MCC	MNC	Brand	Operator	Status	Bands (MHz)	References and notes
748	00	Antel	Administración Nacional de Telecomunicaciones	Not operational	TDMA	MNC withdrawn
748	01	Antel	Administración Nacional de Telecomunicaciones	Operational	GSM 1800 / UMTS 850 / UMTS 2100 / LTE 700 / LTE 1700 / 5G 3500 / 5G 28000	Former brand Ancel; LTE bands 28 / 4
748	03	Antel	Administración Nacional de Telecomunicaciones	Not operational	Unknown	MNC withdrawn
748	07	Movistar	Telefónica Móviles Uruguay	Operational	GSM 850 / GSM 1900 / UMTS 850 / LTE 1900 / 5G 3500	Former Movicom
748	10	Claro	AM Wireless Uruguay S.A.	Operational	GSM 1900 / UMTS 1900 / LTE 1700 / 5G 3500	Former CTI Móvil
748	15		ENALUR S.A.	Unknown	Unknown	

=== V ===
==== Venezuela – VE ====
MCC	MNC	Brand	Operator	Status	Bands (MHz)	References and notes
734	01	Digitel	Corporacion Digitel C.A.	Not operational	GSM 900	Formerly INFONET
734	02	Digitel	Corporacion Digitel C.A.	Operational	UMTS 900 / LTE 1800	DIGITEL-DIGICEL-INFONET merger; GSM shut down Mar 2024
734	03	DirecTV	Galaxy Entertainment de Venezuela C.A.	Unknown	LTE 2600	Formerly DIGICEL
734	04	Movistar	Telefónica Móviles Venezuela	Operational	GSM 850 / GSM 1900 / UMTS 1900 / LTE 1700	CDMA 850 shut down March 2014
734	05	Movistar	Telefónica Venezolana C.A.	Unknown	Unknown	
734	06	Movilnet	Telecomunicaciones Movilnet	Operational	GSM 850 / UMTS 1900 / LTE 1700	CDMA 850 shut down Oct 2020
734	07	Movilnet	Telecomunicaciones Movilnet	Unknown	Unknown	
734	08		PATRIACELL C.A.	Unknown	Unknown	Fixed wireless

== See also ==
- List of mobile network operators of the Americas
- List of LTE networks in the Americas
