= List of mobile network operators of the Americas =

This is a list of mobile network operators of the Americas. Along with mobile network operators, this list includes mobile virtual network operators.

== Anguilla ==
Rank	Operator	Technology	Subscribers (in millions)	Ownership
1	Digicel	850/1900 MHz UMTS, HSPA+ 700 MHz LTE	Not Yet Available	Digicel
2	FLOW	850/1900 MHz UMTS, HSPA+ 700 MHz LTE	Not Yet Available	

== Antigua and Barbuda ==
The country has a 127% penetration rate.

Rank	Operator	Technology	Subscribers (in millions)	Ownership
1	Digicel	GSM, GPRS, EDGE-900; UMTS, HSPA+-1900(2)/850(5); LTE-700(17)	0.062 (Sep 2015)	Digicel
2	FLOW	GSM, GPRS, EDGE-850; UMTS, HSPA+-1900(2)/850(5); LTE-1900(2)/1700(4)	Not Yet Available	Liberty Latin America

== Argentina ==
The country has a 147% penetration rate = 61.2m mobile subscribers (February 2014)

Rank	Operator	Technology	Subscribers (in millions)	Ownership
1/2	Personal	GSM-1900 (GPRS, EDGE); 1900 MHz UMTS, HSDPA, HSPA+ 2600(B7) / 1700(B4) / 700(B28) MHz LTE	18.8 (May 2020)	Telecom Argentina
1/2	Movistar	GSM-850/1900 (GPRS, EDGE); 1900 MHz UMTS, HSDPA, HSPA+ 1700 MHz LTE	20.8 (Dec 2016)	Telecom Argentina
3	Claro	GSM-850/1900 (GPRS, EDGE); 850/1900 MHz UMTS, HSDPA, HSPA+ 1700(B4) / 700(B28) MHz LTE	21.3 (October 2020)	América Móvil (100%)
Mobile Virtual Network Operators
4	Tuenti (using Personal + Movistar network)		0.040 (Nov 2014)	Telefónica (100%)
5	Nuestro (using Personal + Movistar network)			FECOSUR

== Aruba ==
The country's telecom regulator is the DTZ

Rank	Operator	Technology	Subscribers (in millions)	Ownership
1	Digicel	CdmaOne; GSM-900/1800; 2100 MHz UMTS, HSPA+	Not Yet Available	Digicel
2	SetarNV	GSM-900 (GPRS, EDGE); 850/2100 MHz UMTS, HSPA+ 1800 MHz LTE	Not Yet Available	Setar N.V.

== Bahamas ==
The country has 0.318 million subscribers in total, or an 84% penetration rate. (September 2015)

Rank	Operator	Technology	Subscribers (in millions)	Ownership
1	BTC	GSM-850/1900 (GPRS, EDGE); 850 MHz UMTS, HSPA+ 700 MHz LTE	0.31 (March 2017)	Liberty Latin America (49% of ownership, 51% of voting rights),
2	Aliv	850/1900 MHz UMTS, HSPA+ 700/1900/1700 MHz LTE	0.15 (June 2019)	Cable Bahamas Government of the Bahamas

== Barbados ==
The country's telecom regulator is the Telecom Unit, under the Division of Energy and Telecommunications within the Prime Minister's Office.

Rank	Operator	Technology	Subscribers (in millions)	Ownership
1	FLOW	GSM-1900; UMTS, HSPA+-1900(2)/850(5); LTE-1900(2)/850(5)	0.13 (March 2017)	Liberty Latin America (81%)
2	Digicel	GSM-900/1800; UMTS, HSPA+-2100(1)/900(8); LTE-1900(2)/700(12/17)	Not Yet Available	Digicel (75)%

== Belize ==
Rank	Operator	Technology	Subscribers (in millions)	Ownership
1	Digi	GSM-850, 1900 (GPRS, EDGE); 850 , 1900 MHz UMTS, HSPA+ LTE- Band 2(1900), 17(700)	0.120 (June 2007)	Belize Telemedia Limited
2	Smart	CdmaOne; CDMA2000 1x, CDMA2000 EV-DO, LTE	0.025 (Dec 2005)	Speednet

== Bermuda ==
Rank	Operator	Technology	Subscribers (in millions)	Ownership
1	One	CdmaOne; CDMA2000 1xRTT, EV-DO; GSM-1900; UMTS, HSPA+ LTE	Not Yet Available	Bermuda Digital Communications Ltd
2	Digicel	GSM-1900; 850 MHz UMTS, HSPA+ 1900 MHz LTE	Not Yet Available	Digicel

== Bolivia ==
The country has 10.2 million subscribers in total for a population of 10.56 million, or a 96.3% penetration rate. (December 2015)

The country's telecom regulator is ATT.

Rank	Operator	Technology	Subscribers (in millions)	Ownership
1	Entel	GSM-1900 (GPRS, EDGE); 850 MHz UMTS, HSPA+ 700 MHz LTE	5.0 (Dec 2015)	Ministry of Public Works, Services and Housing (97.4671%) and 1200 other shareholders (2.5329%)
2	Tigo	GSM-850 (GPRS, EDGE); 850 MHz UMTS, HSDPA; LTE	3.989 (Dec 2025)	Millicom (100%)(Atlas Investissement (Iliad S.A.) 42.2%)
3	Viva	GSM-1900 (GPRS, EDGE); 850 MHz UMTS	2.2 (Dec 2016)	Trilogy International Partners (71.5%) and Cooperativa de Telecomunicaciones Cochabamba R.L. (28.5%)

== Bonaire ==
Rank	Operator	Technology	Subscribers (in millions)	Ownership
1	Digicel (formerly TELBO)	GSM-900/1800 MHz (GPRS, EDGE); UMTS, HSPA+ 1800 MHz LTE	Not Yet Available	Digicel
2	FLOW	GSM; UMTS, HSDPA 1800 MHz LTE	Not Yet Available	Liberty Latin America (100%)

== Brazil ==
The country has 258 million subscribers in total, or a 125.7% penetration rate. (Q1 2024)

Anatel regulates the country's telecommunications.

Technologies like AMPS, TDMA, iDEN and CDMA 1x/EV-DO were used in the past by some of those networks and have been phased out in favor of newer systems.

On 20 April 2022, Oi’s mobile network operations were sold to the country's three largest carriers, Vivo, Claro and TIM. Over the following twelve months, customers were migrated to one of the other three carriers based on their area codes.

Rank	Operator	Technology	Subscribers (in millions)	Ownership
1	Vivo	GSM-850/900/1800 (GPRS, EDGE); 850/2100 MHz UMTS, HSDPA, HSPA+ 700/1800/2100/2300/2600 MHz LTE, LTE-A, LTE-A Pro; 450 MHz LTE-M; 2300/3500 MHz SA-NSA 5G NR	103.01 (Q4 2025)	Telefônica Brasil (77.9%)
2	Claro	GSM-900/1800 (GPRS, EDGE); 850/2100 MHz UMTS, HSDPA, HSPA+ 700/1800/2100/2600 MHz LTE, LTE-A, LTE-A Pro; 2300/3500 MHz 5G NR	87.65 (Q1 2024)	América Móvil
3	TIM	GSM-900/1800 (GPRS, EDGE); 850/900/2100 MHz UMTS, HSDPA, HSPA+ 700/850/1800/2100/2600 MHz LTE, LTE-A, LTE-A Pro; 3500 MHz 5G NR	61.42 (Q1 2024)	Telecom Italia (67%)
4	Algar Telecom • Only in some areas of GO, MG, MS and SP states	GSM-900/1800 (GPRS, EDGE); 2100 MHz UMTS, HSDPA, HSPA+ 700/1800 MHz LTE; 2300 MHz 5G NR (roams on Claro, TIM and Vivo where there's no Algar coverage)	4.12 (Q1 2024)	Grupo Algar
5	Surf • Only in city of São Paulo • Operates nationally as MVNE using TIM networks	2600 MHz TDD-LTE	0.977 (Aug 2022)	Surf Telecom S.A.

== British Virgin Islands ==
Rank	Operator	Technology	Subscribers (in millions)	Ownership
1	CCT	GSM-850/1900; 850 MHz UMTS LTE	Not Yet Available	CCT Global Communications
2	FLOW	GSM-850/1900 (GPRS, EDGE); 850 MHz UMTS, HSPA+ 700/1900 MHz LTE	Not Yet Available	Liberty Latin America
3	Digicel	GSM-1900; 1900 MHz UMTS, HSPA+ 700 MHz LTE	Not Yet Available	Digicel (85%)

== Canada ==
The country's telecom regulator is the Canadian Radio-television and Telecommunications Commission (CRTC). However, it does not regulate most aspects of mobile phone service; prices and service quality are not regulated at all, while spectrum allocation is handled by Innovation, Science and Economic Development Canada.

There are numerous mobile virtual network operators, such as Virgin Mobile Canada. These are not presently listed due to difficulty retrieving data for all such operators, and uncertainty as to whether the figures below include MVNOs operating on the applicable networks.

Rank	Operator	Technology	Subscribers (in millions)	Ownership
1	Rogers; Includes Fido and Chatr	GSM-850 (GPRS, EDGE); 850 MHz UMTS, HSPA, HSPA+ 600(71)/700(12-13-17)/850(5)/1700(4)/1900(2)/2600(7) MHz LTE, LTE-A; 600(n71)/1700(n66)/2600(n38/n41)/3500(n78) MHz 5G NR	11.609 (Q4 2023)	Rogers Communications
2	Bell; Includes Virgin Plus and Lucky Mobile	UMTS, HSPA, DC-HSPA+ 700(12-13-17-29)/850(5)/1900(2)/1700(4)/2600(7) MHz LTE, LTE-A; 1700(n66)/3500(n78) MHz 5G NR	10.287 (Q4 2023)	Bell Canada
3	Telus; Includes Koodo and Public Mobile	UMTS, HSPA, DC-HSPA+ 600(71)/700(12-13-17-29)/850(5)/1900(2)/1700(4)/2600(7) MHz LTE, LTE-A; 1700(n66) MHz 5G NR	9.801 (Q4 2023)	Telus Communications
4	Vidéotron; Includes Freedom Mobile	1700 MHz UMTS, HSPA, DC-HSPA+ 700/1700/2600 MHz LTE; 600(n71)/1700(n66) MHz 5G NR	3.764 (Q4 2023)	Quebecor
5	SaskTel	850/1900 MHz UMTS, HSPA, DC-HSPA+ 1700 MHz LTE; 1700(n66)/3500(n78) MHz 5G NR	0.667 (Q4 2023)	SaskTel

== Cayman Islands ==
The British overseas territory has ? million subscribers in total, or a 5% penetration rate.

Rank	Operator	Technology	Subscribers (in millions)	Ownership
1	FLOW	GSM-850/1900; 850 MHz UMTS, HSPA+ 700 MHz LTE	Not Yet Available	Liberty Latin America
2	Digicel	CdmaOne; GSM-900; 2100 MHz UMTS, HSPA+ 1800 MHz LTE	Not Yet Available	Digicel (96.875%)

== Chile ==
The country's telecom regulator is Subsecretaría de Telecomunicaciones (Subtel). Chile, as of June 2026, has 23.71 million subscribers in total, including prepaid and postpaid customers, and a 117.69% penetration rate.

Rank	Operator	Technology	Subscribers (in millions)	Ownership
1	Entel (formerly, Entel PCS)	900/1900MHz UMTS; 700/1900/2600MHz LTE-FDD, LTE-A 2600/3500MHz 5G NR NSA, SA VoLTE, VoWiFi, eSIM	8.13 (June 2026)	Almendral S. A. (100%)
2	Movistar (formerly, Telefónica Móvil and BellSouth)	850/1900MHz UMTS; 700/1900/2600MHz LTE-FDD, LTE-A 3500MHz 5G NR NSA VoLTE, VoWiFi, eSIM	5.40 (June 2026)	NJJ Holding (51%), Millicom (49%)
3	Claro (formerly, Smartcom)	850/AWS/1900MHz UMTS 700/AWS/1900/2600MHz LTE-FDD, LTE-A 2600/3500MHz 5G NR NSA, SA VoLTE, VoWiFi, eSIM: Claro also roams on WOM using 3G and 4G technologies only.	5.12 (June 2026)	América Móvil (100%)
4	WOM (formerly, Nextel)	AWS UMTS 700MHz/AWS LTE-FDD, LTE-A 700/AWS/3500MHz 5G NR NSA VoLTE, VoWiFi, eSIM: WOM also roams on Claro using 3G and 4G technologies only.	4.83 (June 2026)	BlackRock, Amundi, Moneda Asset Management, Man GLG Partners (100%)
Mobile virtual network operators
5	Mundo (using Movistar and WOM)	Mundo roams on Movistar and WOM using 3G and 4G technologies only.	0.179 (June 2026)	DigitalBridge (100%)
6	Virgin Mobile (using Movistar)	eSIM	0.040 (June 2026)	Virgin Mobile Latin America (Beyond ONE, Virgin Group)
7	GTD/Telsur (using Movistar)		0.002 (June 2026)	Grupo GTD (100%)

== Colombia ==
The country has 92,5 million subscribers in total. (First Trimester 2025)

The country's telecom regulator is the CRC (Comisión de Regulación de Comunicaciones).

Rank	Operator	Technology	Subscribers (in millions)	Ownership
1	Claro	1900(2) MHz UMTS, HSDPA, HSPA+ 2600(7) MHz, 1900(2) MHz, 700(28) MHz LTE; 3500(n78) MHz 5G NR; VoLTE, VoWiFi, ViLTE, RCS, eSIM	41,2 (Jun 2025)	América Móvil (99.4%)
2/3	Tigo	1900(2) MHz UMTS, HSDPA, HSPA+ 1700(4) MHz, 700(28) MHz, 1900(2) MHz LTE; 3500(n78) MHz 5G NR; VoLTE, RCS, eSIM	13.194 (Dec 2025)	Millicom (Atlas Investissement (iliad) 42.2%) (100%)
2/3	Movistar	850(5) MHz UMTS, HSDPA, HSPA+ 1700(4) MHz, 1900(2) MHz, 850(5) MHz, 2600(38) MHz LTE; 3500(n78) MHz 5G NR; VoLTE, VoWiFi, RCS, eSIM	20,99 (Jun 2025)	Millicom (100%)
4	WOM	1700(4) MHz UMTS, HSDPA, HSPA+ 1700(4) MHz, 2600(7) MHz, 700(28) MHz LTE; 3500(n78) MHz 5G NR; VoLTE, VoWiFi, RCS	7,4 (Jun 2025)	Novator Partners (majority stake)
Mobile Virtual Network Operators
5	Virgin Mobile (using Tigo + Movistar)	850(5) MHz UMTS, HSDPA, HSPA+ 1700(4) MHz, 1900(2) MHz, 850(5) MHz, 2600(38) MHz LTE; 3500(n78) MHz 5G NR	3,2 (Jun 2025)	Virgin Mobile
6	Móvil Éxito (using Tigo + Movistar)	1900 MHz UMTS, HSDPA, HSPA+ 1700(4) MHz, 700(28) MHz, 1900(2) MHz LTE; 3500(n78) MHz 5G NR; VoLTE, RCS	1.7 (June 2023)	Grupo Éxito
7	ETB (using Tigo + Movistar)	1900(2) MHz UMTS, HSDPA, HSPA+ 1700(4) MHz, 700(28) MHz, 1900(2) MHz LTE	0.2 (Jun 2025)	ETB
9	Suma Móvil (using Tigo + Movistar)	1900(2) MHz UMTS, HSDPA, HSPA+ 1700(4) MHz, 700(28) MHz, 1900(2) MHz LTE	0.1 (Jun 2025)	

== Costa Rica ==
The country has 7.1 million subscribers in total; with 4.76 million people there are about 149 mobile lines for every 100 citizens (149% penetration rate).

Until 2011, Instituto Costarricense de Electricidad had a monopoly on wireless communications. In November 2011, after the market was open as required by DR-CAFTA, Claro and Movistar started service.

The country's telecom regulator is SUTEL (Spanish)

Rank	Operator	Technology	Subscribers (in millions)	Ownership
1	Kölbi	GSM-1800 (GPRS, EDGE); 850/2100 MHz UMTS, HSDPA; 1800 (3)/2600 (7) MHz LTE	4.33	Instituto Costarricense de Electricidad
2	Liberty	GSM-1800 (GPRS, EDGE); 850/2100 MHz UMTS, HSDPA; 1800 (3)/2100 (1) MHz LTE	1.42	Liberty Latin America
3	Claro	GSM-1800 (GPRS, EDGE); 2100 MHz UMTS, HSPA+ 1800 (3)/2100 (1) MHz LTE	1.13	América Móvil
Mobile virtual network operators
4	Tuyo Móvil (using Kölbi)	GSM (GPRS, EDGE); UMTS, HSDPA	0.14	Televisora de Costa Rica S.A.
5	Fullmóvil (using Kölbi)	GSM (GPRS, EDGE); UMTS, HSDPA	0.03	Virtualis

== Cuba ==
The country has over 6 million subscribers in total, or a 45% penetration rate as of December 2019.

Rank	Operator	Technology	Subscribers (in millions)	Ownership
1	Cubacel	GSM-850/900 MHz GPRS, EDGE; 2100 MHz (1), 900 MHz (8) UMTS, HSDPA, HSUPA; 1800 MHz (3), 2100 MHz (1), 900 MHz (8), 700 MHz (28) LTE	Not Yet Available	ETECSA

== Curaçao ==
Rank	Operator	Technology	Subscribers (in millions)	Ownership
1	Digicel	GSM-900/1800/1900; UMTS, HSPA+ LTE	Not Yet Available	Digicel
2	FLOW	GSM-900; 2100 MHz UMTS, HSDPA 1800 MHz LTE	Not Yet Available	Liberty Latin America (100%)

== Dominica ==
Rank	Operator	Technology	Subscribers (in millions)	Ownership
1	Digicel	GSM-1800/900; UMTS, HSPA+-2100(1)/900(8); LTE-1900(2)/700(12/17)	Not Yet Available	Digicel
2	FLOW	GSM-1900/850; UMTS, HSPA+-1900(2)/850(5); LTE-1900(2)/700(13)	Not Yet Available	Liberty Latin America

== Dominican Republic ==
The country has 9.73 million subscribers as of December 2021.

The country's telecom regulator is Indotel.

Rank	Operator	Technology	Subscribers (in millions)	Ownership
1	Claro (formerly CODETEL)	CdmaOne; CDMA2000 1x GSM-850/1900 (GPRS, EDGE); 850 MHz UMTS, HSDPA; 1700 MHz LTE	5.98 (Dec 2021)	América Móvil (100%)
2	altice (formerly Orange and Tricom)	CdmaOne; GSM-1800/1900 (GPRS, EDGE); CDMA2000 1x CDMA2000 EV-DO; 900 MHz UMTS, DC-HSPA+ 1800-1900 MHz LTE	3.25 (Dec 2021)	Altice Hispaniola
3	Viva	CdmaOne; CDMA2000 1x, CDMA2000 EV-DO; GSM-1900 (GPRS, EDGE)	0.49 (Dec 2021)	Trilogy International Partners

== Ecuador ==
The country has 113% penetration rate = 17.5m mobile subscribers (February 2014)

The country's telecom regulator is Arcotel.

Rank	Operator	Technology	Subscribers (in millions)	Ownership
1	Claro	GSM-850 (GPRS, EDGE); 850 MHz UMTS, HSPA+ 1700 MHz LTE	7.822 (October 2020)	América Móvil (100%)
2	Tigo	GSM-850 (GPRS, EDGE); 850 MHz UMTS, HSPA+ 1900 MHz LTE	5.081 (Dec 2025)	Millicom (100%)
3	Cnt	450 MHz CDMA2000 1x, CDMA2000 EV-DO; GSM-1900; UMTS, HSPA+ 1700 MHz LTE	0.723 (Q1 2015)	Corporación Nacional de Telecomunicaciones, CNT EP
Mobile Virtual Network Operators
4	Tuenti (using Tigo network)			Tuenti Ecuador

== El Salvador ==
The country has 8.8 million subscribers in total for a population of 6.1 million, or a 144% penetration rate. (Dec 2015)

The country's telecom regulator is SIGET.

Rank	Operator	Technology	Subscribers (in millions)	Ownership
1	Tigo	GSM-850/1900 (GPRS, EDGE); 850 MHz UMTS, HSPA+ 850 MHz LTE	3.048 (Dec 2025)	Millicom (100%)(Atlas Investissement (NJJ) 42.2%)
2	Claro	GSM-850 (GPRS, EDGE); 850/1900 MHz UMTS, HSPA+	1.426 (June 2007)	América Móvil (95.8%)
3	Movistar	GSM-850 (GPRS, EDGE); 850/1900 MHz UMTS, HSDPA 1900 MHz LTE	0.847 (Dec 2006)	General International Telecom (99.3%)
4	Digicel	900 MHz GSM (GPRS, EDGE); 900 MHz UMTS, HSDPA, HSPA+	1.0 (June 2015)	Digicel

== Falkland Islands ==
The telecom regulator is Falkland Islands Communications Regulator (FICR).

Rank	Operator	Technology	Subscribers (in millions)	Ownership
1	Sure	GSM-900	Not Yet Available	Batelco

== France (Saint-Pierre-et-Miquelon) ==
The telecom regulator is the Autorité de Régulation des Communications Électroniques, des Postes et de la Distribution de la Presse.

Rank	Operator	Technology	Subscribers (in millions)	Ownership	MCC / MNC
1	SPM Telecom	GSM-900/800/1800 MHz	Not Yet Available	Orange S.A. (70%), Landry (30%)	30801

== Greenland ==
Greenland has 0.053 million subscribers in total, or a 93.32% penetration rate. (December 2009)

Rank	Operator	Technology	Subscribers (in millions)	Ownership	MCC / MNC
1	tusass (formerly TELE Greenland)	GSM-900; 900 MHz UMTS; 800 MHz LTE	0.01355 (2011)	TELE Greenland	29001

== Grenada ==
Rank	Operator	Technology	Subscribers (in millions)	Ownership
1	FLOW	GSM, GPRS, EDGE-900/1800; UMTS, HSPA+-850(5); LTE-700(13)	Not Yet Available	Liberty Latin America
2	Digicel	GSM, GPRS, EDGE- 900/1800; UMTS, HSPA+-1900(2); LTE-700(17)	Not Yet Available	Digicel (100%)

== Guadeloupe, Martinique and French Guiana (Guyane) ==
As of September 2012, the penetration rate was 153% for Guadeloupe (0.449 million inhabitants), 148% for Martinique (0.396 m.inh.) and 127% for French Guiana (0.236 m.inh.).

Rank	Operator	Technology	Subscribers (in millions) markets share (%)	Ownership
1	Orange Caraïbe	GSM-900 (GPRS, EDGE); UMTS, HSPA+ 1800/2600 MHz LTE	Not Yet Available	Orange S.A.
2	Digicel	GSM-900/1800 (GPRS, EDGE); 2100 MHz UMTS, HSDPA; 1800/2600 MHz LTE	Not Yet Available	Digicel (100%)
3	SFR Caraïbe	GSM-900/1800; 2100 MHz UMTS, HSDPA LTE	15%, 25%, 27% (Q2 2012)	Numericable (Altice)

== Guatemala ==
The country has 19,113,800 subscribers in total, or a 115% penetration rate. (June 2017)

The country's telecom regulator is SIT.

Rank	Operator	Technology	Subscribers (in millions)	Ownership
1	Tigo	GSM-850 (GPRS, EDGE); 850 MHz UMTS, HSPA+ 850 MHz LTE	11.711 (Dec 2025)	Millicom (Atlas Investissement (NJJ) 42.2%)(100%)
2	Claro	GSM-900/1900 (GPRS, EDGE); 1900 MHz UMTS, HSPA+	9.3 (June 2017)	América Móvil (99.3%)

== Guyana ==
The country has a 66.4% penetration rate (2016).

The country's telecom regulator is the Guyana Telecommunications Agency.

Rank	Operator	Technology	Subscribers (in millions)	Ownership
1	Digicel	GSM-900 EDGE UMTS HSPA+ LTE	0.305 (June 2015)	Digicel
2	One Communications Guyana	GSM-900 HSPA+	0.203 (June 2015)	Atlantic Tele-Network (80%); Government of Guyana (20%)

== Haiti ==
Rank	Operator	Technology	Subscribers (in millions)	Ownership
1	Digicel	GSM-900/1800 (EDGE); 2100 MHz UMTS, HSPA+	4.7 (June 2015)	Digicel
2	NATCOM	GSM-900; 2100 MHz UMTS, HSPA; 1700 MHz (AWS-1) LTE	0.5 (Jan 2012)	60% owned by Viettel Mobile and 40% by the Haitian State

== Honduras ==
The country has 7.45 million subscribers in total, or a 93.5% penetration rate. (2018)

The country's telecom regulator is CONATEL.

Rank	Operator	Technology	Subscribers (in millions)	Ownership
1	Tigo	CdmaOne; GSM-850 (GPRS, EDGE); 850 MHz UMTS, HSPA+ 1700 MHz LTE	5.003 (Dec 2025)	Millicom (Atlas Investissement (NJJ) 42.2%)(66.7%)
2	Claro	GSM-1900 (GPRS, EDGE); 1900 MHz UMTS, HSDPA 1700 MHz LTE	5.0 (December 2024)	América Móvil (100%)
3	HONDUTEL	GSM-1900	0.07 (April 2016)	HONDUTEL

== Jamaica ==
The country has 3.5 million subscribers in total, or a 129% penetration rate (September 2015). The country's telecom regulator is the Spectrum Management Authority.

Rank	Operator	Technology	Subscribers (in millions)	Ownership
1	Digicel	GSM-900 (GPRS, EDGE); 850 MHz UMTS, HSPA+ DC-HSDPA; 700 MHz (Band 17), 700 MHz (Band 12), 850 MHz (Band 5), 1700 MHz (Band 4), 1900 MHz (Band 2) LTE	2.2 (June 2015)	Digicel
2	FLOW	850 & 1900 MHz UMTS & HSPA+ 700 MHz (Band 12), 1700 MHz (Band 4), 1900 MHz (Band 2) LTE	0.93 (March 2017)	Liberty Latin America (82%)

== Mexico ==
The country has 112 million subscribers in total, or a 91.6% penetration rate. (March 2017)

The country's current telecom regulator is IFETEL (IFT).

Rank	Operator	Technology	Subscribers (in millions)	Ownership
1	Telcel	GSM-1900 MHz (GPRS, EDGE); 850/1900 MHz UMTS, HSDPA, HSPA+ 1700 MHz LTE; 3500 MHz NR	83.2 (June 2023)	América Móvil (100%)
2	Movistar	1700 MHz UMTS, HSPA+ 850, 1700, 1900, 2600 MHz LTE	25.8 (March 2017)	OXIO Inc. and Newfoundland Capital Management
3	AT&T Mexico (Includes Unefón)	850/1700/1900 MHz UMTS, HSPA+ 850, 1700, 1900, 2600 MHz LTE; 2600 MHz NR	21.6 (December 2022)	AT&T Inc.
4	Red Compartida (Shared network available for MVNOs)	700 MHz LTE	5 (December 2021)	ALTÁN Redes
Mobile Virtual Network Operators
5	Virgin Mobile (using Movistar)	GSM-1900 (GPRS, EDGE); 850/1900 MHz UMTS, HSPA+ 1900 MHz LTE	0.802 (March 2017)	Virgin Mobile
6	QBO Cel (using Movistar)	GSM-1900 (GPRS, EDGE); 850/1900 MHz UMTS, HSPA+	0.132 (March 2017)	Canaliza Software
7	weex (using Movistar)	GSM-1900 (GPRS, EDGE); 850/1900 MHz UMTS, HSPA+ 1900 MHz LTE	0.150 (March 2017)	Truu Innovation
8	Cierto (using Movistar)	GSM-1900 (GPRS, EDGE); 850/1900 MHz UMTS, HSPA+	0.015 (March 2017)	Teligentia
9	Maz Tiempo (using Movistar)	GSM-1900 (GPRS, EDGE); 850/1900 MHz UMTS, HSPA+	0.010 (March 2017)	Maz Tiempo
10	Oui Móvil (using Telcel)	GSM-1900 MHz (GPRS, EDGE); 850/1900 MHz UMTS, HSDPA, HSPA+ 1700 MHz LTE	0.030 (March 2017)	Telecomunicaciones 360
11	Flash Mobile (using Movistar)	GSM-1900 (GPRS, EDGE); 850/1900 MHz UMTS, HSPA+ 1900 MHz LTE	0.064 (March 2017)	Logística ACN México

== Montserrat ==
Rank	Operator	Technology	Subscribers (in millions)	Ownership
1	FLOW	GSM-850 EDGE UMTS HSPA+	Not Yet Available	Liberty Latin America
2	Digicel	GSM EDGE UMTS HSPA+ LTE	Not Yet Available	Digicel Group

== Nicaragua ==
The country has 6.8 million subscribers in total, or a 115% penetration rate. (2013)

Rank	Operator	Technology	Subscribers (in millions)	Ownership
1	Claro (formerly Enitel)	GSM-1900 (GPRS, EDGE); 850 MHz UMTS, HSPA+ 1700 MHz LTE	3.67 (Dec 2013)	América Móvil (99.6%)
2	Tigo	CdmaOne, CDMA2000 1x GSM-850 (GPRS, EDGE; 850/1900 MHz UMTS, HSDPA 1900 MHz LTE	3.781 (Dec 2025)	Millicom (Atlas Investissement (NJJ) 42.2%)

== Panama ==
The country has 4.96 Million subscribers in total, or 123 active mobile phones per 100 inhabitants according to ASEP. (December 2016)

Rank	Operator	Technology	Subscribers (in millions)	Ownership
2	+móvil	GSM-850 (GPRS, EDGE); 850/1900 MHz UMTS, HSDPA, HSPA+ 700/1900 MHz LTE (Band 28/Band 2)	1.78 (March 2017)	Cable & Wireless (49%)
1	Tigo	GSM-850 (GPRS, EDGE); 850/1900 MHz UMTS, HSDPA, HSPA+ 700 MHz LTE (Band 28)	2.946 (Dec 2025)	Millicom (Altas Investissement (iliad) 42.2%)

== Paraguay ==
The country has 7.34 Million subscribers in total, or a 109% penetration rate. The country's telecom regulator is CONATEL. (Nov 2015)

Rank	Operator	Technology	Subscribers (in millions)	Ownership
1	Tigo	GSM-850/1900 (GPRS, EDGE); 850 MHz UMTS, HSDPA; 1700 MHz LTE	4.416 (Dec 2025)	Millicom (Atlas Investissement (iliad S.A.) 42.2%)(100%)
2	Personal	GSM-850 (GPRS, EDGE); 850/1900 MHz UMTS, DC-HSPA+ 1900 MHz LTE	2.4 (Nov 2015)	ABC Color and Telecom Argentina
3	Claro	GSM-1900 (GPRS, EDGE); 1900 MHz UMTS, HSPA+ 1700 MHz LTE	0.8 (Nov 2015)	América Móvil (100%)
4	VOX	GSM-850/1900 (GPRS, EDGE); 900 MHz UMTS, HSPA+ 1700 MHz LTE	0.36 (Nov 2015)	COPACO S.A.

== Peru ==
The country has 37.3 million subscribers in total for a population of 30.4 million, or a 123% penetration rate. (Mar. 2017)

The country's telecom regulator is OSIPTEL.

Rank	Operator	Technology	Subscribers (in millions)	Ownership
1	Integratel (Formerly Movistar)	GSM-850 (GPRS, EDGE); 850 MHz UMTS, HSPA+ 1700 MHz LTE	15.0 (Mar 2017)	Integra Tec International (100%)
2	Claro (Formerly TIM)	GSM-1900 (GPRS, EDGE); 1900 MHz UMTS, HSPA+ 1900 MHz LTE	10.552 (October 2020)	América Móvil (100%)
3	Entel (Formerly Nextel)	iDEN; 1900 MHz UMTS, HSDPA; 1700 MHz LTE	5.9 (Mar 2017)	Entel (Chile)
4	Bitel (Formerly Viettel Peru S.A.C.)	1900 MHz UMTS, HSPA+ 900 MHz LTE	4.6 (Mar 2017)	Viettel Mobile
Mobile Virtual Network Operators
5	Cuy Móvil (using Claro)			Cuy Móvil

== Puerto Rico and United States Virgin Islands ==
These U.S. territories have 3 million subscribers in total, or an 84% penetration rate. (June 2012).

The telecom regulator for Puerto Rico and the United States Virgin Islands at federal level is the United States' Federal Communications Commission (FCC).

The local telecom regulator for Puerto Rico is the Junta Reglamentadora de Telecomunicaciones de Puerto Rico (JRTPR) The local telecom regulator for USVI is the USVI Public Services Commission (USVIPSC)

Rank	Operator	Technology	Subscribers (in millions)	Ownership
1	Claro (formerly Verizon)	GSM-850/1900 (GPRS, EDGE); 850/1900 MHz UMTS, HSDPA, HSUPA, HSPA, HSPA+ 700 1700AWS MHz LTE	1.6 (Q2 2020)	América Móvil (100%)
2	Liberty (formerly AT&T)	850/1900 MHz UMTS, HSDPA, HSUPA, HSPA, HSPA+ 850(5)/700(12-14-17-29)/1700(4-66)/1900(2)/2300(30) MHz LTE, LTE-A; 850(5) MHz 5G NR	0.9 (Q3 2024)	Liberty Latin America
3	T-Mobile •Includes Metro by T-Mobile •Includes the previous Sprint network	?	?	Deutsche Telekom AG (43%); SoftBank Group Corporation (24%) free float (33%)
4	One Communications Guyana (formerly Viya)	?	?	Atlantic Tele-Network (80%); Government of Guyana (20%)
Mobile virtual network operators
5	TracFone Wireless	CdmaOne; CDMA2000 1xRTT; GSM (GPRS)	?	Verizon (100%)

1. Currently unable to determine T-Mobile and TracFone subscriber numbers without the United States' subscribers.

== Saint Kitts and Nevis ==
The country has approximately 25,000 subscribers in total.

Rank	Operator	Technology	Subscribers (in millions)	Ownership
1	FLOW	GSM-850/1900; UMTSHSPA+ 700 MHz LTE	Not Yet Available	Liberty Latin America
2	Digicel	GSM 900/1800; 2100 MHz UMTS HSPA+	Not Yet Available	Digicel

== Saint Lucia ==
Rank	Operator	Technology	Subscribers (in millions)	Ownership
1	FLOW	GSM-850; UMTS, HSPA+ 700 MHz LTE	Not Yet Available	Liberty Latin America
2	Digicel	GSM 900/1800 (EDGE); 2100 MHz UMTS, HSPA+	Not Yet Available	Digicel (91.02%)

== Saint Vincent and the Grenadines ==
Rank	Operator	Technology	Subscribers (in millions)	Ownership
1	FLOW	GSM-850 (GPRS); UMTS, HSPA+	Not Yet Available	Liberty Latin America
2	Digicel	GSM 900/1800; 2100 MHz UMTS	Not Yet Available	Digicel

== Suriname ==
The country has 0.81 million subscribers in total, or a 146% penetration rate. (2016). The regulator is the Telecommunicatie Authoriteit Suriname (TAS).

Rank	Operator	Technology	Subscribers (in millions)	Ownership
1	Telesur	GSM-900/1800 MHz (GPRS, EDGE); 2100 MHz UMTS, HSPA+ 700/1800 MHz LTE	Not Yet Available	Telesur
2	Digicel	GSM-900/1800 MHz (GPRS, EDGE); 850 MHz UMTS, HSPA+	Not Yet Available	Digicel (87.7%)

== Trinidad and Tobago ==
At the end of 2021, the country has 2.00 million subscribers in total, or a 146% penetration rate. The regulator is Telecommunications Authority of Trinidad and Tobago (TATT)

Rank	Operator	Technology	Subscribers (in millions)	Ownership
1	Digicel	GSM, GPRS, EDGE-850, UMTS, HSPA+, DC-HSPA+- 850(5)/1900(2), LTE, LTE-A-700(28)/1700(4)/1900(2)	1.35 (2016)	Digicel (100%)
2	bmobile	GSM, GPRS, EDGE-850, UMTS, HSPA+, DC-HSPA+-850(5)/1900(2), LTE, LTE-A-700(28)/1700(4)/1900(2)/(2500(41) for FWB), NR-2500 (FWB)	1.2 (2016)	Cable & Wireless Communications (49%) Government of Trinidad and Tobago (51%)

== Turks and Caicos Islands ==
Rank	Operator	Technology	Subscribers (in millions)	Ownership
1	Digicel	GSM-900/1800 (GPRS, EDGE); 2100 MHz UMTS, HSPA+ LTE	Not Yet Available	Digicel (51%)
2	FLOW (which acquired the assets of Islandcom Wireless)	GSM-850; UMTS; HSPA+ LTE	Not Yet Available	Liberty Latin America

== United States ==
Mobile virtual network operators (MVNOs) in the United States lease wireless telephone and data service from Mobile Network Operators (MNOs) such as AT&T Mobility, T-Mobile US, or Verizon.

The country's telecom regulator is the United States Federal Communications Commission.

Rank	Operator	Technology	Subscribers (in millions)	Ownership
1	Verizon; Includes Verizon Value and Visible by Verizon	LTE 700 (13), 850 (5), 1700 (4-66), 1900 (2), 3500 (48) MHz; 5G NR 850 (n5 via DSS), 1900 (n2 via DSS), 3700 (n77), 28000 (n261), 39000 (n260) MHz	146.8 (Q1 2026)	Verizon Communications Inc.
2	T-Mobile; Includes Metro by T-Mobile, Assurance Wireless, Mint Mobile and Ultra Mobile	LTE, LTE-A 600 MHz (71), 700 MHz (12), 850 MHz (5), 1700/2100 MHz (4,66), 1900 MHz (2,25), 2500 MHz (41); 5G NR 600 MHz (n71), 1900 MHz (n25), 1700/2100 MHz (n66), 2.5 GHz (n41), 26 GHz (n258), 39 GHz (n260), 28 GHz (n261)	142.4 (Note: T-Mobile US no longer reports total subscribers in their earnings reports as of Q1 2026.) (Q4 2025)	Deutsche Telekom AG (51.4%); SoftBank Group Corporation (7.6%) free float (41%)
3	AT&T; Includes FirstNet by AT&T and Cricket Wireless	LTE, LTE-A 850 (5), 700 (12-14-17-29), 1700 (4-66), 1900 (2), 2300 (30) MHz; 5G NR 850 (n5), 1900 (n2 via DSS), 1700/2100 (n66 via DSS), 3700 (n77), 28000 (n261), 39000 (n260) MHz	109.8 (Note: AT&T no longer reports wholesale subscribers in their earnings reports as of Q1 2026.) (Q2 2026)	AT&T Inc.
4	C Spire; Only in some areas of MS, TN, AL states	LTE; 5G NR	?	Telapex, Inc.
5	GCI; Only in the state of AK	LTE; 5G NR	?	GCI Liberty Inc.

== Uruguay ==
As of June 2020, Uruguay has 5.3 million mobile subscribers in total. The country's telecom regulator is URSEC.

Rank	Operator	Technology	Subscribers (in millions)	Ownership
1	Antel	1800 MHz GSM; 2100 MHz UMTS, HSPA+ 1700 MHz LTE	2.75 (June 2020)	State-owned
2	Tigo	850/1900 MHz GSM; 850/1900 MHz UMTS, HSPA+ 1900 MHz LTE	1.146 (December 2025)	Millicom (100%)
3	Claro	1900 MHz GSM; 1900 MHz UMTS, HSPA+ 1700 MHz LTE	0.96 (June 2020)	América Móvil (100%)

== Venezuela ==
The country has 20.7 million subscribers in December 2018, a 33% drop versus December 2013.

The country's telecom regulator is CONATEL.

Rank	Operator	Technology	Subscribers (in millions)	Ownership
1	Movilnet	GSM-850 (GPRS, EDGE); 1900 MHz UMTS, HSDPA; 1700/2100 MHz LTE (Jan. 2017)	8.85 (Dec 2018)	CANTV
2	Movistar	GSM-850 (GPRS, EDGE); 1900 MHz UMTS, HSPA, HSPA+ 1700/2100 MHz LTE	8.84 (Dec 2018)	Telefónica (100%)
3	Digitel GSM	GSM-900 (GPRS, EDGE); 900 MHz UMTS HSDPA HSUPA HSPA+, 1800 MHz LTE	3.04 (Dec 2018)	Televenco

== See also ==
- List of mobile network operators in Asia and Oceania
- List of mobile network operators in Europe
- List of mobile network operators in the Middle East and Africa
- List of mobile network operators worldwide
- List of telecommunications regulatory bodies
- Mobile Network Codes in ITU region 3xx (North America)
- Mobile Network Codes in ITU region 7xx (South America)
