= Viva (Bolivia) =

Telecommunications company

Empresa de Telecomunicaciones Nuevatel PCS de Bolivia S.A.
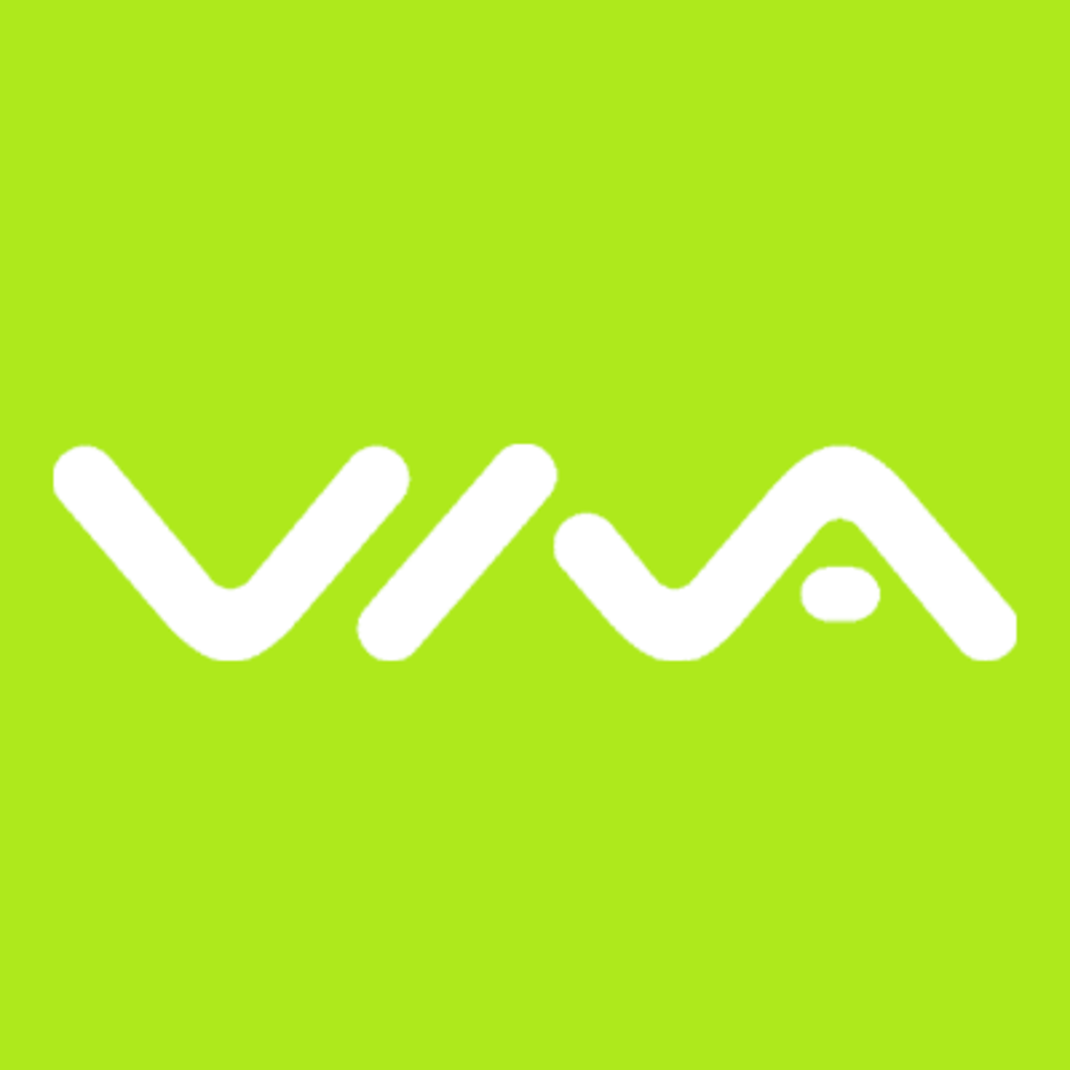
- Company type: Sociedad Anónima
- Industry: Telecommunications
- Founded: November 11, 1999
- Founder: COMTECO
- Headquarters: Santa Cruz de la Sierra, Bolivia
- Number of locations: More than 1000 points
- Area served: Bolivia
- Key people: Ryan Alvarez (CEO)
- Services: Mobile telephony Internet; Digital wallet
- Owner: Balesia Technologies (71.5%); COMTECO (28.5%)
- Website: www.viva.com.bo

Empresa de Telecomunicaciones Nuevatel PCS de Bolivia S.A., doing business as VIVA, is a Bolivian wireless network operator and telecommunications company. It was founded in 1999. It is currently among the largest companies in the country. Viva is the third-largest wireless carrier in Bolivia, with a market share of 12.9%.

== History ==
Nuevatel PCS was founded in 1999 as a joint venture between Western Wireless Corporation with 72% and COMTECO (a telecommunications cooperative from Cochabamba) with 28%, and began operations a year later.

On January 9, 2005, Western Wireless entered into a merger agreement with Little Rock-based telecommunications provider Alltel, in which Alltel agreed to pay $6 billion in shares and cash to Western Wireless shareholders. Western Wireless shareholders voted on July 29, 2005, to accept a $4.4 billion offer in shares and cash from Alltel. The merger was completed on August 1, 2005. Western Wireless founders, John W. Stanton and Theresa Gillespie, founded Trilogy International Partners and retained Nuevatel as part of their assets.

On March 28, 2022, Trilogy, which inherited Nuevatel from co-founder Western Wireless, sold its 71.5% stake to Balesia Technologies. COMTECO owns the remaining 28.5% since the company's inception.
