= CTBC =

CTBC may refer to:

- Companhia de Telecomunicações do Brasil Central, former name of Algar Telecom
- CTBC Financial Holding, Taiwanese holding company
  - CTBC Bank, Taiwanese bank, subsidiary of CTBC Holding
  - CTBC Brothers, Taiwanese professional baseball team
