= Centennial Communications =

Defunct American telecommunication company

Centennial Communications Corp
- Type: Public
- Traded as: Nasdaq: CYCL
- Industry: Telecommunications
- Founded: 1988; 38 years ago
- Defunct: 2010; 16 years ago
- Fate: Acquired by AT&T
- Headquarters: Wall, New Jersey, United States
- Key people: Michael Small (CEO)
- Revenue: US$1,001 million (2008)
- Number of employees: 3,400 (2008)
- Website: www.centennialwireless.com Centennial Puerto Rico

Centennial Communications and its subsidiaries (Centennial Wireless and Centennial de Puerto Rico) was a wireless and broadband telecommunications services provider in the United States, Puerto Rico, and the U.S. Virgin Islands. On March 13, 2007, Centennial Communications completed the sale of Centennial Dominicana to Trilogy International Partners for approximately $80 million in cash.

== Overview ==
Centennial Communications Corp. and its subsidiaries were a wireless and broadband telecommunications services company. The company provided wireless network access and other services to wireless telephone subscribers in Puerto Rico and the United States Virgin Islands. It provided various custom calling features, such as voice mail, caller ID, call forwarding, call waiting, and conference calling, as well as messaging services, including text messaging, picture messaging, and multimedia messaging services. Centennial Communications also offered its customers with Internet access directly from their handsets as well as AirCards for laptops and computers and the ability to download games, ring tones, and other applications. It provided various handsets employing TDMA and GSM/GPRS technology in the United States; and CDMA technology in the Caribbean. In addition, the company offered a range of communications services, including Asynchronous Transfer Mode, Frame Relay, Wi-Fi, gigabit Ethernet dedicated access, dedicated Internet ports, international long distance, switched access, High Speed Internet Access, dial-up Internet access, and private line services over its own fiber-optic and microwave network in Puerto Rico. Further, it offered various types of data center services, such as server and storage collocation, Web hosting, and managed services.

In February 1997, former Centennial chief Emanuel Pinez was arrested on charges of unlawful insider trading and for running a fraudulent scheme to overstate results. By the time of Perez's trial in 1999, Centennial has lost the Wall Street prestige which the company had previously had in 1996. In March 2000, he was given a five year prison sentence and ordered to pay $150 million in restitution. Two other business executives, including former Centennial chief financial officer James Murphy, would be convicted with Perez as well. The fallout from the Pinez scandal resulted in Centennial seeing its stock delisted and profit being wiped out. By March 14, 2007, Centennial Communications provided wireless and integrated communications services in the United States and Puerto Rico to only approximately 7.1 million wireless subscribers, and 387,500 access lines and equivalents. The company was founded in 1988. It was formerly known as Centennial Cellular Corp. and changed its name to Centennial Communications Corp. in 2000. At the time of the closure, Centennial Communications was headquartered in Wall, New Jersey.

== Centennial Wireless ==
Centennial Wireless, a wholly owned subsidiary of Centennial Communications, was a regional wireless telecommunications provider that operated a GSM network in the Midwest states of Michigan, Ohio and Indiana as well as the Southeastern states of Mississippi, Louisiana, and Texas. Centennial also operated CDMA networks in Puerto Rico and the U.S. Virgin Islands. Centennial Wireless had approximately 1.1 million subscribers as of October 2007. It was the ninth largest wireless telecommunications network in the United States.

Centennial Wireless launched its BlackBerry service on September 27, 2007.

== AT&T buyout ==
AT&T announced a $944 million buyout of Centennial Communications Corp. on November 11, 2008. The acquisition was subject to regulatory approval, the approval of Centennial’s stockholders and other customary closing conditions. Welsh, Carson, Anderson & Stowe, Centennial’s largest stockholder, agreed to vote in support of the transaction. AT&T hoped to obtain approvals by the end of the second quarter of 2009. In an attempt to quell regulators, on May 9, 2009, AT&T entered an agreement with Verizon Wireless to sell off certain existing Centennial service areas in the states of Louisiana and Mississippi for $240 million pending the successful merger of AT&T and Centennial.

On July 8, 2009, AT&T announced a delay in the acquisition of Centennial, being postponed to by the end of the third quarter of 2009. The delay was announced shortly after the U.S. Department of Justice began an investigation on AT&T and Verizon Communications for anti-competitive behavior due to both carriers' massive growth.

On November 6, 2009, the FCC gave final approval to AT&T's buyout of Centennial Communications. AT&T divested five markets in Louisiana and Mississippi to Verizon Wireless. Three additional markets were divested to an unknown buyer. AT&T temporarily continued to operate Centennial's CDMA networks in Puerto Rico and the U.S. Virgin Islands, rather than immediately move all customers to GSM/UMTS. On July 18, 2010, AT&T absorbed Centennial in the Caribbean and the Centennial brand became AT&T.

As of 2020, AT&T sold its wireless networks in Puerto Rico and the U.S. Virgin Islands to Liberty Puerto Rico with the sale completed in 2020.
