= Virgin Mobile Chile =

- Industry: Telecommunications
- Founded: April 2012; 14 years ago
- Website: www.virginmobile.cl

Virgin Mobile Chile is a mobile network operator in Chile using the Movistar mobile network.

Virgin Mobile Latin America (VMLA) launched operations in Chile in April 2012, having received regulatory approval from Chile's telecommunications regulator as well as signing an agreement with Movistar, one of the country's leading mobile network operators. VMLA announced in June of this year its plan to become Latin America's leading mobile virtual network operator (MVNO). Since then, the company has made significant progress towards its goal of beginning commercial operations in many countries. Chile will be its first commercial operation in early 2012. Richard Branson commented: "We are excited to have made such good progress towards launching our first mobile business in Latin America in Chile."This is an exciting project for Virgin and we believe Virgin Mobile Chile customers will be delighted by the services we will be offering them at launch." “We are very appreciative of Subtel’s (Chile’s Subsecretaría de Telecomunicaciones) prompt approval of our application," said VMLA's chairman Phil Wallace.

== See also ==
- List of mobile network operators of the Americas § Chile
