= Tigo Guatemala =

Mobile phone service provider

Comunicaciones Celulares S.A., in Guatemala
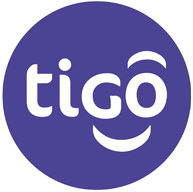
- Tigo Logo
- Company type: Owned by MIC
- Founded: (initial) 1989 as COMCEL
- Website: TIGO Guatemala

TIGO, Comunicaciones Celulares, S.A. or just COMCEL is a mobile phone service provider company owned by the international mobile phone company Millicom or just MIC. In 2004 COMCEL changed their name to TIGO introducing their GSM Technology, new mobile phone sources, new mobile phones, more coverage, new fresh look and also new plans.

At this time it is by a small margin the number one mobile phone provider in Guatemala. There are also other TIGOs in Latin America in the Central American countries of El Salvador, Honduras, and also in the South American nations of Colombia, Paraguay, and Bolivia. TIGO Guatemala is the biggest subsidiary of TIGO in Central America with a base of more than 8 million subscribers

In Guatemala, Tigo's competitors are: the Spanish movistar and the Mexican Claro.

On August 29, 2008 TIGO launched their 3.5G data network operating on the HSDPA 850 MHz band, and is currently the only 3.5G network in Guatemala, as well as the one with least speed caps (a cap of 3.6 Mbit/s has been set) while other networks (such as Claro) cap their network at around 1.5 Mbit/s.

TIGO offers the following cellphone brands: Alcatel, i-mate, LG, Motorola, Nokia, SAMSUNG, Siemens, Sony Ericsson, Treo, and VK Mobile.

Tigo Money Guatemala

Guatemala has access to Tigo Money, an electronic wallet that allows users to carry out transactions such as sending and receiving money, paying utility bills, remittances, making payments at different businesses, loans, and recharging Tigo packages. You can register by downloading the Tigo Money app or from the Tigo Money web https://tigomoney.com/gt/home-gt

== Services in Latin America ==
All the MIC services as Tigo in Latin America

- Guatemala TIGO GT
- El Salvador TIGO SV
- Honduras TIGO HN
- Colombia TIGO CO
- Paraguay TIGO PY
- Bolivia TIGO BO
- Nicaragua TIGO NI
