= Viva (network operator) =

Telecommunications company in Dominican Republic

Trilogy Dominicana S.A.
- Trade name: Viva
- Type: Subsidiary
- Industry: Telecommunication
- Founded: 1883; 143 years ago
- Headquarters: Santo Domingo, Dominican Republic
- Products: Wireless telecommunication services
- Parent: Grupo Telemicro
- Website: viva.com.do (in Spanish)

Trilogy Dominicana S.A., doing business as Viva, is a mobile network operator in the Dominican Republic.

== History ==
Centennial Dominicana's previous logo.

Founded in 1883 as All America Cables & Radio Dominican Republic (an ITT subsidiary), the company was the country's first telecom to offer telegraph services to the Antilles.

In January 2000, Centennial Communications purchased 70% of the company, forming Centennial Dominicana. The company later launched a CDMA2000 network and provided Internet services over EVDO.

On November 24, 2006 Centennial Communications announced that they were selling 100% of Centennial Dominicana to Trilogy International Partners for US$80M. In April 2008, Centennial announced a rename to Viva and launched their GSM/GPRS/EDGE network. At the end of 2015 the Telemicro group owned by the business man Juan Ramon Gomez Diaz acquired the operations of Trilogy Dominicana. In August 2017 Viva launched a new 4x4 MIMO 4G LTE network.

== Plans ==
Viva has focused on prepaid and hybrid plans. Postpaid plans are commonly not featured in mainstream media.
