= Colombia Móvil =

Colombian mobile phone company

Tigo Colombia Móvil
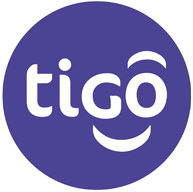
- Company type: Public-private partnership
- Industry: Telecommunications
- Founded: 2002
- Founder: ETB and EPM
- Headquarters: Bogotá, Colombia
- Area served: Colombia
- Owner: Millicom
- Website: www.tigo.com.co

Colombia Móvil S.A., marketed under Tigo (formerly OLA), is the third largest mobile phone company in Colombia and is headquartered in Bogotá. Its primary owner is Millicom. The company provides cellular telecommunications services nationally and internationally through the Tigo brand, and under the Orbitel brand in Canada, the United States, and Spain (offering long-distance services and mobile telephony with Orbitel Móvil).

Initially, and until December 1, 2006, Colombia Móvil used the commercial brand OLA. From that date forward, it was rebranded as Tigo following its acquisition by Millicom.

== History ==
=== Founding and early operations ===
Colombia Móvil was established in January 2003 after being awarded its national Personal Communications Service (PCS) license. The operator began as a joint venture between the fixed-line operator ETB (50%) and the public services and telecommunications group Empresas Públicas de Medellín (50%).

Colombia Móvil, operating under the OLA brand, commenced operations in late 2003. Its shareholders secured the license through a public auction, paying US$56 million to become the country's first PCS operator. Empresas Públicas de Medellín (EPM) and ETB each owned 50% of OLA's shares. The awarding of this license had been delayed since 1997 due to various lawsuits filed by the incumbent cellular operators, Comcel and Celumóvil. These companies had maintained a duopoly since 1994, charging exorbitant rates to users. This situation caused significant technological stagnation for the country compared to the rest of the world and even within the region, as countries like Chile had been granted similar licenses since 1997.

In 2004, OLA successfully launched its "Pioneros" plan, which promoted calls between the company's phones at $30 per minute. However, the network and service infrastructure were only designed to handle half the volume of subscribers.

=== Transition to Tigo ===
As of December 1, 2006, OLA remained the third-largest mobile phone operator in Colombia, with over 2.7 million subscribers. Despite being surpassed by its cellular competitors, Comcel and Movistar, OLA gained ground against the second-largest operator (Movistar) by selling 10,985 more lines by the end of that third quarter. On December 1, OLA officially changed its name to Tigo following the acquisition of 50% plus one share by Millicom (via Millicom Colombia S.A.). This rebranding aimed to expand coverage and services, grow its customer base, and gain market share from other operators through aggressive advertising campaigns.

On November 11, 2013, ETB decided to sell its stake in Tigo to UNE, an EPM subsidiary, ahead of the merger between UNE and Tigo. In the same year, Alejandro Santodomingo joined the Board of Directors.

=== Merger with UNE ===
On August 16, 2014, the merger deeds between Tigo and UNE were signed, concluding a process that had been two years in the making. This merger allowed for the integration of UNE's fixed services with Tigo's mobile telephony, transforming the combined company into the second-largest operator in Colombia. Through this process, UNE absorbed Tigo (Colombia Móvil S.A.), and Millicom International (Tigo's owner) capitalized UNE. EPM obtained the majority stake in the newly formed company, TigoUne (50.01%). Furthermore, UNE, as the absorbing entity, became the parent company, directly controlling Edatel S.A., Empresa de Telecomunicaciones de Pereira S.A., Cinco Telecom Corporation (domiciled in Florida), Orbitel Comunicaciones Latinoamericana, and Orbitel Servicios Internacionales S.A. The company's headquarters are located in Medellín.

As of October 2015, both brands were maintained separately: Tigo for mobile services and TigoUNE for fixed services. For the corporate sector, the company had already begun to offer an integrated portfolio.

Since 2019, TigoUNE shortened its brand to Tigo for both mobile and fixed services.

=== Future acquisition of Movistar Colombia ===
In March 2025, Millicom announced the acquisition of all shares of Movistar (Colombia) for an amount close to US$400 million. This action is subject to authorization from regulatory authorities.

== Technology ==
Colombia Móvil supports its operations on several wireless technologies:

- GSM: Tigo uses GSM and GPRS technology on the 1900 MHz band nationwide to offer traditional mobile voice services.
- EDGE: This technology, available in approximately half of the areas with Tigo coverage, allows users to browse the internet at a speed of around 250 Kbps.
- UMTS and HSDPA: These technologies, available in approximately 400 Colombian towns and cities, allow the company to offer internet access of up to 5 Mbps to its users via 3G (UMTS) and 3.5G (HSDPA) technologies.
- HSPA+: On October 23, 2011, Tigo commercially launched its 4G service using HSPA+, with an average speed of 10 Mbps on the 1900 MHz band in the country's two largest cities (Bogotá and Medellín). By 2017, it covered more than 200 towns across Colombia.
- LTE: On December 3, 2013, Tigo commercially launched its 4G LTE service, with a peak speed of 40 Mbps on the Band IV AWS 1700 MHz in the cities of Barranquilla, Bogotá, Bucaramanga, Cúcuta, Cali, Cartagena, Medellín, and Santa Marta.*
- 5G: In February 2019, Tigo announced it was the first operator in Colombia to conduct 5G trials.*

*Since 2024, the speed of 4G and 5G networks has been limited to less than 2 Mbps for certain applications and websites through a Traffic Shaping policy. The theoretical purpose of this is to ensure all users have a proper browsing experience.

== Service coverage ==
Colombia Móvil TIGO closed the third quarter of 2013 with over 7.2 million users nationwide, representing 14.99% of the market. Its network coverage serves approximately 770 of Colombia's 1,064 municipalities, which accounts for about 80% of the population.

Regarding 4G LTE coverage, it currently serves the cities of Bogotá, Medellín, Barranquilla, and Bucaramanga.

In 2005, a group of users from the former OLA—now Tigo—created a portal to share information about the mobile operator, called Comunidad OLA. This website is the first community for mobile users in Colombia, created as a meeting point for all Tigo (formerly OLA) users. On the site, Tigo Colombia customers can find information about the company's promotions, services, plans, and mobile devices.

== Fixed services ==
Tigo is an N-play, or multi-service, operator.

- Mobile telephony: In 2011, it launched the "La Sim" service, becoming the fifth mobile virtual network operator (MVNO) in Colombia. It provides its service on the Tigo platform.
- Long-distance telephony: The company offers long-distance services using the prefixes 005 and 05. This long-distance license allows it to provide services nationally to any fixed-line or mobile phone user.
- Tigo Play: This is an online entertainment platform where users can find TV series, movies, children's programming, and sports, all free for the operator's customers.

Tigo also has an international presence as a long-distance operator aimed at Latin American immigrants via its brand Orbitel, offering home-based IP long-distance telephony services.
