= Digitel (Venezuela) =

Corporación Digitel, C.A.

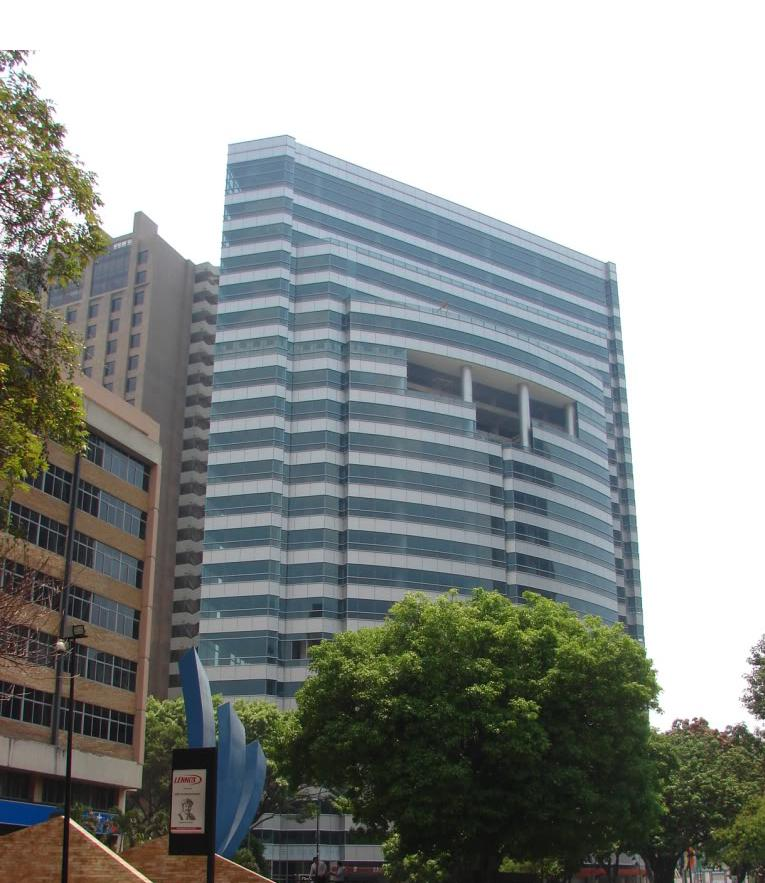
- Headquarters in Chacao, Caracas
- Trade name: Digitel
- Type: Private
- Industry: Telecommunications
- Founded: 1995; 31 years ago
- Headquarters: Torre Digitel, Chacao, Miranda, Venezuela
- Products: Wireless telecommunication
- Parent: Grupo Televenco
- Website: https://www.digitel.com.ve

Digitel is a mobile phone company in Venezuela, and the country's first to deploy a GSM network and to establish a per second charging scheme. Early in 2007, Digitel surpassed 3 million subscribers and is currently placed third, behind CANTV's Movilnet and Telefonica's Movistar.

Digitel's growth has remained steady. Digitel currently provides wireless data transmission capabilities through its GSM–GPRS and high speed EDGE network. In 2007 Digitel deployed an UMTS network on its existing 900 MHz spectrum..

In 2000, after receiving government approval, Digitel sold 56.56% of its stocks to Telecom Italia Mobile, changing its name to Digitel TIM.

Digitel's network originally only covered Venezuela's central region, reaching around 44% of the entire population; however, in January 2006, a request to the government to approve merger with Venezuela's two other GSM networks (Digicel and Infonet) to achieve full national coverage, and in May 2006 the company was acquired entirely by the Televenco group together with the two other operators, after which the company's name changed to its current: Digitel GSM.

The company began a network expansion program in July 2006, and by the end of the year more than 1,070 radio bases had been installed, 7 switches in Caracas, Valencia, Puerto La Cruz and Maracaibo, stretching its GPRS/EDGE network in the West of the country and offering communication, data, information and entertainment to all its customers.

Early in 2010, Digitel got its 3G/WCDMA (HSDPA, HSUPA, GSM/WCDMA) network working all over the country, becoming the fastest provider despite its slow growth.

Lately in 2013, Digitel got its 4G/LTE (LTE network working in mayor cities such as Caracas, Maracay, Valencia among others, becoming this way the first operator in Venezuela offering LTE capabilities. The phones sold with 4G uSIM were BlackBerry Z10 and Huawei Ascend P1 LTE, both supporting 1800Mhz network.
