= Novator Partners =

English private equity investment firm

Novator Partners LLP is a British private equity investment firm based in London owned by Björgólfur Thor Björgólfsson.

== Assets overview ==
The company specializes in investments in companies based in emerging markets. Industries by which it focuses on include telecommunications, pharmaceuticals, social gaming, financial services and natural resource sectors.

=== Investments ===
In 2003 Novator acquired a 70% stake in Czech telecoms company České Radiokomunikace for £120m. It owns 39.23% of the shares in T-Mobile Czech Republic a.s. (one of the two largest mobile operators in the Czech Republic). Novator sold the stake three years later for £942m.

In 2005 it acquired the largest single stake in Finnish telecom company Elisa for around £100m. The stake was later sold in 2007 for £311m.

In 2005 Actavis acquired the New Jersey–based generic drug company Amide Pharmaceutical for US$500 million.

In 2005 Novator invested in video game developer CCP, and sold their stake to developer Pearl Abyss for $425 million.

In 2006 it acquired a large stake in Polish telecom Netia. Netia has the second-largest fixed-line network in Poland. Netia and Novator announced that they are going to build a 4th mobile network in Poland. Novator sold its entire 30.3% stake in Netia in 2009.

In 2007 Novator founded Play, a Polish telecommunications provider. Play IPO’ed on the Warsaw Stock Exchange in July 2017. Novator sold its remaining stake in Play to Iliad SA, a French provider of telecommunications services in September 2021.

In 2007 Novator founded data center company Verne Global and sold it to Digital 9 Infrastructure in 2021.

In 2007 Novator made a $12.5 million investment in TurkNet. In 2013, the Çelebiler family acquired 100% ownership of Turknet, a telecommunications internet service provider, by purchasing the remaining shares from Novator.

In 2010 Novator founded Greenqloud, a cloud computing software company in Iceland. It was sold to NetApp in 2017.

In 2015 Novator acquired 100% of WOM (Chile) (formerly Nextel Chile) in Chile.

In 2016 Novator invested in Zwift, a multiplayer online indoor cycling game in Series A funding that reached $27 million. Novator co-led Zwift's $120 million Series B funding round, alongside Highland Europe, Causeway, and True. Novator also participated in its $450 million Series C funding round.

In January 2016 Novator invested in Artificial Intelligence company Disruptional, formerly known as Play Fusion Ltd.

In 2016 Novator made a partial exit from Nova, an Icelandic mobile operator, when it sold 50% of Nova to Anchorage, Alaska based private equity firm, Pt. Capital.

In November 2016 Novator invested in British online food delivery company, Deliveroo.

In 2018, Novator invested in AppLovin, an internet software and services company, alongside global investment company KKR.

In 2019, Novator led $25 million Series C funding of Rebag, a New York-based digital platform, enabling it to expand to 30 more stores. Novator also led REBAG's $33 million Series E funding round in 2021.

In 2019 Novator led a $22.33 million funding round to further develop a multiplayer online space colony simulation game called Seed. Novator was joined by Lego Ventures, the investment entity of the Lego brand. Birgir Ragnarson, partner at Novator, was appointed Klang's chairman of the board.

In August 2019 Lockwood Publishing announced a funding round led by existing investors and new shareholders Novator. The round was led by CCP Games CEO Hilmar Veigar Pétursson. The total amount was not specified.

In 2020, Novator participated in online bank Monzo’s £60 million funding round.

In 2020, Novator invested in Cazoo, a UK-based online used car buying platform, as part of a £240 million funding round.

In 2020 Novator led men’s wellness/health service, Numan’s £10m Series A funding round along with other venture capitals. Novator also participated in the company’s $40 million Series B funding round in September 2021.

In 2020 Novator Partners buys majority stake in Colombia's Avantel telecommunications company. Nevertheless, Novator Partners entered into the country with a new brand, WOM, and will be competing in the market together with Avantel. Chris Banister "el tío WOM" will lead the new "WOM Colombia".

In 2021 Novator participated in e-scooter rental company, Tier Mobility's $40 million Series B Round, Series C funding round of $250 million and $200 million Series D funding round.

In 2021 video game company, Ubisoft joined lead investor Novator Capital in a €14.1 million funding round.

In 2021 Novator participated in digital flower buying platform, Bloom & Wild's $102 million funding round and a £50 million funding round

In August 2021, Novator invested $250 million in Prime Focus Limited, the parent company of visual effects studio DNEG.

An 18.27% stake in the Economic & Investment Bank (EIBank) in Bulgaria, which was previously 100% owned Bulgarian Prime Minister Boyko Borisov's domestic partner Tsvetelina Borislavova.

Actavis acquired Indian research company Lotus Laboratories.

It acquired a controlling stake in Finnish telecom Saunalahti.

Acquired a 65% stake in Bulgarian Telecommunications Company for an undisclosed sum. In 2007 the stake was sold for £855m. It acquired a large stake in Polish telecom P4.
