= Tuenti =

Telefónica's virtual mobile operator in Spain and Latin America

Tuenti Technologies, S.L.U.
- Type: Private, Limited
- Industry: Internet; Software; Telecommunications
- Founded: 22 February 2006; 20 years ago
- Founder: Zaryn Dentzel; Félix Ruiz Hernández; Kenny Bentley; Adeyemi Ajao; Joaquín Ayuso de Pául
- Headquarters: Gran Vía, 28. Madrid, Spain.
- Area served: Spain; Peru; Argentina; Ecuador; Guatemala
- Key people: Pablo Ledesma (chief)
- Net income: 21,000,000 EUR (2014)
- Owner: Telefónica
- Number of employees: 180 (2016, approximation)

Tuenti Technologies, S.L.U is a mobile virtual network operator (MVNO) that operates with the Tuenti brand owned by Telefónica. It is a Spain-based tech company that focuses on providing a cloud-based services through its own application and its website to their customers.

Originally, Tuenti was created in 2006 as a social networking service, becoming the most popular social network among young people in Spain between 2009 and 2012. With over 15 million registered users, Tuenti was referred to as the "Spanish Facebook".

In Spain, Tuenti offered mobile telephone service. The mobile phone service in Spain was terminated on 1 June 2022. Contract customers were moved to O2 while prepaid customers were moved to Movistar.

In Latin America, Tuenti ships its brand through Telefónica branches in those countries. Tuenti offers free VoIP calls and instant messaging through its own messaging app.

== Company history ==
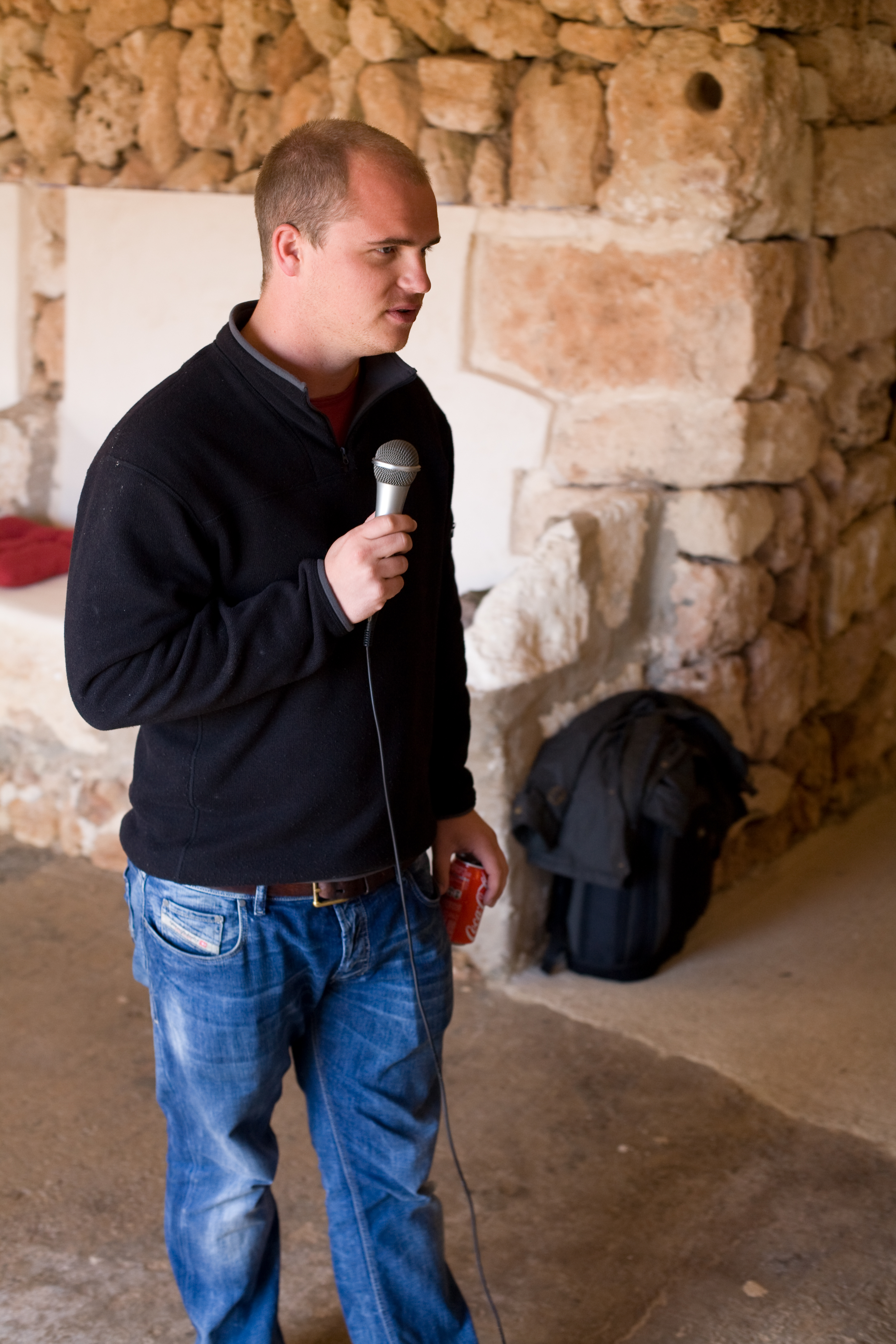
Founder Zaryn Dentzel in 2008

Tuenti was founded as a Social networking service in 2006 by a group of friends in Spain. Zaryn Dentzel, Felix Ruiz Hernandez, Kenny Bentley, Adeyemi Ajao and Joaquín Ayuso de Pául were the key people who worked together to bring Tuenti to life. Dentzel's first experience in Spain was on a students exchange program that took him to Cabeza del Buey (Badajoz). Bentley, the lead programmer, came to Spain after having worked in social networking in the United States. In the beginning, the project was aimed to university students, but due to its success, they opened to everyone, although it was only possible to register with an invitation. Years later the register was opened to everyone, in an attempt to make it available globally, with the only extra requirement of giving a phone number. Zaryn Dentzel has chronicled the story of Tuenti in a book called El futuro lo decides tú.

Although the name sounds similar to the English word twenty, it actually comes from "tu [id]enti[dad]", meaning "your identity". The service was originally targeted at the Spanish market, but in 2012 it was made available globally. The organization has employed more than 250 employees from more than 21 countries.

Google Zeitgeist's 2009 listed Tuenti as the third fastest-rising global search. In 2011, it was estimated that more than 15% of the web traffic in Spain was on Tuenti, which at that time in Spain meant more traffic than Google and Facebook together.

On 4 August 2010 the major telecommunications group Telefónica acquired 85% of Tuenti's shares for a total of 70 million euro, becoming its largest shareholder.

In that same year, Tuenti started the development of a light virtual mobile network operator which worked completely under the Movistar (Telefónica) infrastructure. Later, in December, the service, which was still in a developing state, was released to the users of the social network under the brand "Tu".

On 6 November 2013, Telefónica owned 100% of the company after an agreement with the remaining shareholders.

Tuenti launched its mobile operator brand in Mexico, Peru and Argentina in 2014.

During 2014, the company reported that their mobile operator represented 98% of the income. The company attained a global turnover of 21 million euro, 25% more than the previous year. Although it was still not positive, this year's financial report was the best since the launching of their mobile business and the acquisition by Telefónica.

In 2015, Sebastian Muriel was appointed as the new CEO of the company. During this year and 2016, Tuenti went through a rebranding and the company reaffirmed its commitment with the mobile market by completely renewing their website, which got rid of all the remaining social elements and functions. Telefónica also started to make important changes in the management team: Sebastian Muriel, along with the social network team became part of Telefónica's I+D team, a division of the company in charge for innovation and new products, while Pablo Ledesma became the new director.

== Mobile operator (in Spain) ==
Tuenti
- Developer: Tuenti Technologies
- Operating system: iOS, Android
- Type: VoIP, Instant Messaging
- License: Proprietary
- Website: tuenti.com

=== History ===
==== Pre-launch phase ====
Tuenti launched Tu as a developing project in 2010 supported by Telefónica, which was the largest shareholder back then, aiming to have influence in the young market that the social network had at that time.

Signing up for Tu was free of charge during the initial launching, but it had certain limitations: it was only accessible by invitation (an invitation from a social network user who already had signed up was a requirement, the company sent invitations to random users with this purpose), once an invitation was received users could only sign up for a new number, meaning that number portability from another provider was not possible. The service was only available on prepaid at launch. The provisioned SIM card was posted nationwide free of charge.

During the pre-launch phase, offered plans changed multiple times. First plans launched consisted in weekly, biweekly, or monthly plans which were focused on calls, SMS, and free access to the social network after recharging. Almost a year later postpaid plans were first launched.

==== Final launching ====
On 15 February 2012 the company officially launched Tuenti Móvil for social network users, dropping the name Tu used for the pre-release phase. This official launch came with new plans, and dropped the invitation system which was previously required to access the service. A month later, postpaid plans were launched.

One year later, Tuenti announced a better integration between Tuenti Móvil and its social network, with a new feature named "ZEROLÍMITES". This proposal aimed to make the whole brand more attractive for current and potential customers and social network users. By that time, the social networking platform had experienced a noticeable decrease in active users.

In 2014, the company began deployment of their own mobile core-network in Spain. At the same time, they also gained presence as a mobile operator on ITU. "VozDigital" launched in July, which allowed users to make calls from the Tuenti app without requiring the other party to have the app as well.

== Mobile operator (overseas) ==
=== Mexico ===
26 June 2014 was the key date for the first official announcement of the international launch: The brand Tuenti started its operations in Mexico. There was a celebration at Campus Party Mexico, giving away for free 2,500 SIM cards for users to provide feedback.

Two years after the brand release, in July 2016 the brand quietly ceases its activity. Customers are migrated automatically to Movistar and Tuenti's social media profiles for Mexico are removed. Sebastian Muriel, CEO of Tuenti, claimed in an interview that the results of the brand in Mexico were not as good as expected due to the monopolistic situation of telephony market.

=== Argentina ===
Tuenti replaced the brand "Quam", also owned by Telefónica on 18 November 2014. Plus, from that moment, users would be able to access Tuenti's mobile application to watch and manage their services.

=== Peru ===
In October 2014, Peru became the third country in which the brand was released. Peru was also the first country apart from Spain in which VozDigital was launched, enabling customers to make calls (but not to receive them) to any national fixed line or mobile destination through almost any device and just an internet connection.

=== Ecuador ===
The brand was launched on 29 May 2015, with an advertising campaign named "Libérate" (free yourself).

=== Guatemala ===
Brand was launched on 22 June 2017, with a massive media campaign called "Sin Pajas" and were using #SinPajas as principal hashtag campaign.

== Social network ==
Tuenti was once the most popular social network in Spain and it featured all the tools common to social-networking sites. It allowed users to set up a profile, upload photos and videos, connect and communicate with friends. Many other utilities, such as a chat application, the ability to create events, and tagging locations and places were also offered in the beginning. Unlike similar social networking sites which feature banner advertisements, Tuenti opted out of these traditional forms of obstructive and invasive advertising, in order to respect the privacy of the user.

In later years, as many users left the social platform and some essential functions of the social network were removed, the company changed its focus from its social network to becoming a virtual mobile operator. Keeping the social platform alive was no longer profitable. On 1 February 2016 confidential information was leaked from old employees of the company who claimed that social network closure was imminent. Just a month later, the company launched an update to their mobile application and website that removed all the remaining social networking features, except the chat platform. It also enabled users to download their data for certain period of time, inviting users to download and try the new features such as VozDigital, using their own current phone number to make free calls.

== See also ==
- Comparison of instant messaging clients
- Comparison of instant messaging protocols
- Comparison of VoIP software
- List of most downloaded Android applications
- Mobile VoIP
- Unified communications
