= John W. Stanton =

American businessman (born 1955)

- Stanton in 2026
- Born: 1955 (age 70–71)
- Education: Whitman College (BA); Harvard University (MBA)
- Spouse: Theresa Gillespie

John W. Stanton (born 1955) is an American businessman. He is the majority owner of the Seattle Mariners of Major League Baseball (MLB) and has led several wireless communication companies.

== Early life and education ==
Stanton was born in 1955. A lifelong resident of the Seattle area, he attended Newport High School in Bellevue, Washington. He earned a bachelor’s degree from Whitman College in Walla Walla, Washington. He earned an MBA from Harvard Business School.

== Career ==
=== Wireless communications ===
Stanton was the founder and former CEO of Western Wireless Corporation, former chairman and CEO of VoiceStream Wireless, and former chairman of the CTIA.

He became the first employee of McCaw Cellular Communications in the early 1980s. He was COO and vice chairman of McCaw in the 1980s.

After he left McCaw, he founded the company that became Western Wireless in 1992. From 1992 to 2005, he was the CEO and chairman of Western Wireless. He was the founder of Voicestream Wireless Corp. Between 1995 and 2003, VoiceStream Wireless had him as chairman and CEO as well, with that company renamed T-Mobile USA after an acquisition. In 2004, Stanton was inducted into the Wireless Hall of Fame. From 2008 until 2013 he was director and then chairman of Clearwire.

In 2005, he, Strive Masiyiwa, Bradley Horwitz, and others formed Trilogy International Partners. Initially, Stanton had a $295 million equity stake in Trilogy. In 2024, Trilogy announced that SG Enterprises, owned by Stanton and his wife Theresa Gillespie, had purchased all Trilogy shares and that Trilogy would be delisted from the Toronto Stock Exchange. He is also chairman of Trilogy Equity and co-founder of Trilogy Search Partners.

In 2006, Stanton's net worth was $1 billion. Stanton was listed as #840 in the Forbes 2007 "Richest People" study. His net worth was estimated at $1.1 billion. As of November 2026, he was listed as the 1,755th wealthiest person, with a net worth of $2.4 billion.

=== Seattle Mariners ===
As one of 17 minority owners in the team, in April 2016, Stanton was appointed as the new CEO of the Seattle Mariners organization after Nintendo sold its majority stake for $661 million. Major League Baseball formally approved the sale of the Mariners to Stanton that August. Stanton took over as control person from retiring chairman Howard Lincoln. Stanton became responsible for the Seattle Mariners day-to-day operations.

In 2019, the team had few wins, with Stanton arguing the metric to look at was player success within a long-term plan. In 2021, Stanton accepted the resignation of team president Kevin Mather, after Mather had confessed to manipulating the service time of Mariners prospects and made comments about the poor English-language skills of some of the team's foreign-born players. In a statement, Stanton said Mather's comments "were inappropriate and do not represent our organization's feelings about our players, staff, and fans."

In 2024, Stanton said he regretted that team manager Scott Servais learned he was fired through media reports rather than directly from the team. He also said that team spending must be sustainable over the long term, which led to some criticism that the team spends less than its competitors.

== Boards ==
In 2014, he had chaired or co-chaired the Business Partnership for Early Learning, the United Way of King County campaign, the Washington Roundtable, and the Regional Transportation Commission.

Stanton joined Microsoft's board of directors in July 2014. He joined the compensation committee of the board. He owned $43 million in Microsoft stock, as of September 2026. He was also a director at Columbia Sportswear.

Stanton joined the board of Costco in October 2015. He owned approximately $25 million in Costco stock, as of November 2026. As of August 2016, Stanton reportedly owned approximately $45 million of stock in Columbia Sportswear, General Communication Inc., and other companies.

He is a past chairman of the board of trustees of Whitman College. In 2018, Whitman named a newly constructed residence hall after Stanton, who had graduated in 1977.

== Personal life ==
Stanton lives in Bellevue, Washington with his wife, Theresa Gillespie. They have two sons.
