= Western Wireless Corporation =

American telecommunications company

- Type: Private
- Traded as: Nasdaq: WWCA
- Industry: Wireless telecommunications
- Predecessor: Pacific Northwest Cellular; General Cellular Corporation
- Founded: 1988; 38 years ago (as Stanton Communications)
- Founder: John W. Stanton; Theresa Gillespie
- Defunct: August 1, 2005; 21 years ago
- Fate: Merged with Alltel Corporation
- Successor: Alltel Corporation
- Headquarters: Bellevue, Washington, United States
- Area served: 19 states
- Key people: John W. Stanton (Chairman and CEO)
- Revenue: ▲US$1,917 million (2004)
- Operating income: ▲US$308 million (2004)
- Net income: ▲US$233 million (2004)
- Total assets: ▲US$3,118 million (2004)
- Total equity: ▲US$264 million (2004)
- Number of employees: 2,495 (2004)
- Subsidiaries: Western Wireless International Corporation; VoiceStream Wireless

Western Wireless Corporation was a cellular network operator that provided mobile telecommunications service to subscribers in 19 western states in the United States, and seven other countries. Western Wireless marketed analog cellular service under the Cellular One brand in 88 FCC-defined rural service areas and digital PCS service under the VoiceStream brand in 19 FCC-defined metropolitan service areas. At its peak in 2004, Western Wireless provided service to 1.4 million domestic subscribers. Western Wireless obtained additional revenue from the international operations of its Western Wireless International Corporation subsidiary, which was licensed to provide wireless communications services in seven countries to a total of 1.8 million subscribers.

Western Wireless traces its roots to Stanton Communications, founded in 1988 by John W. Stanton and Theresa Gillespie. Western Wireless was formed in 1994 by the merger of two other Stanton controlled entities, Pacific Northwest Cellular and General Cellular Corporation. Western Wireless became a publicly traded company in 1996. Western Wireless spun off its VoiceStream Wireless subsidiary in 1999, which was later purchased by Deutsche Telekom AG in 2001. Deutsche Telekom renamed VoiceStream Wireless to T-Mobile USA in 2002.

Western Wireless merged with Alltel Corporation in August 2005. After the merger, Alltel sold Western Wireless' international assets.

== History ==
From its headquarters in Bellevue, Washington, United States, Western Wireless Corporation provided wireless communications service in 19 western states. The company initially specialized in providing cellular service to rural areas under the Cellular One brand, but expanded into urban areas by acquiring PCS spectrum licenses, building out digital networks and providing services under the VoiceStream brand.

Western Wireless traces its roots to Stanton Communications, founded by John W. Stanton and Theresa Gillespie in 1988. Stanton Communications invested in communications related businesses, including cellular, paging, telephone answering, alarm system monitoring, voice mail, radio broadcasting and private cable television. Stanton Communications invested in private cable television in the Soviet Union and cellular communications service in Hong Kong.

Stanton was the founder, chairman and chief executive officer of Pacific Northwest Cellular, established in 1992. The company grew to become the United States' eighth-largest independent cellular company.

Stanton was elected chairman of the board of directors for General Cellular Corporation in 1992, when Stanton Communications and investment firm Hellman and Friedman acquired a controlling interest in the company.

Stanton and Hellman and Friedman created Western Wireless Corporation in August, 1994 by merging Pacific Northwest Cellular and General Cellular Corporation. The merged entity took the name Western Wireless Corporation and through the merger created what the company called the "largest rural cellular-service provider in the United States." At the time of the merger, the company offered service in 16 western and mid-western states with service areas covering 5.2 million potential customers.

Western Wireless became a publicly traded company in May 1996, offering 12.65 million shares traded on the NASDAQ under the stock ticker symbol WWCA. Combined with a separate public bond offering, the company raised US$430 million in net proceeds.

On May 3, 1999, Western Wireless spun off its VoiceStream Wireless division to Western Wireless shareholders, creating an independent, publicly traded Delaware corporation called VoiceStream Wireless Corporation. Shares of VoiceStream Wireless traded on the NASDAQ under the stock ticker symbol VSTR. The spin off was intended to remove any conglomerate discount, get better value recognition for each of Western Wireless' core analog cellular and digital PCS networks and help each business pursue independent strategies. VoiceStream was purchased by Deutsche Telekom in 2001 for US$30 billion and renamed T-Mobile USA in 2002.

On January 9, 2005, Western Wireless entered into a merger agreement with Little Rock, Arkansas-based telecommunications provider Alltel in which Alltel agreed to pay $6 billion in company shares and cash to Western Wireless shareholders. Western Wireless shareholders voted on July 29, 2005, eleven years to the day after Western Wireless was incorporated, to accept a US$4.4 billion stock-and-cash offer from Alltel. The merger closed on August 1, 2005. At the time, the merger created the fifth largest wireless communications provider in the United States with 10 million customers in 33 states.

== Western Wireless International ==
Western Wireless subsidiary Western Wireless International Corporation held mobile licenses in several countries outside the United States including: Austria (Tele.Ring), Ireland (Meteor Mobile Communications), Slovenia (Vega), Haiti (ComCel), Bolivia (Viva), Iceland (TAL), Croatia (vipnet), Georgia, Ghana and Côte d'Ivoire covering about 1.8 million subscribers in 2005.

After Alltel acquired Western Wireless, non-core international assets were sold. Alltel sold Meteor to Irish telecoms incumbent, eircom and sold Tele.Ring to T-Mobile Austria. In Slovenia, the assets of Vega were split between the two main network operators.

== See also ==
- i wireless
