= Speednet =

Telecommunications company in Belize

Speednet Communications Limited is a Belizean communications company. Established in 2003, the company mostly deals with cellular services under the brand name "SMART" and other landline services.

== Background ==
=== The BTL monopoly ===
Prior to Speednet, Belizeans only had one telecommunications company, BTL, which provided adequate services for exorbitant rates. This led to a number of protests in late 2001. Under its chairman Lord Michael Ashcroft, BTL was said to be monopolizing the communications industry in Belize. The government of Belize said it intended to open the industry to competition.

=== Jeffrey Prosser and Intelco ===
In 1999, Data Pro International began operations in the Corozal Free Zone, and the following year this was extended to include telecommunications services. BTL challenged the agreement, saying it violated the 15-year exclusive contract given to them through 2002. In response, the government signed a new contract with LGS Services to provide telecommunication services to the government in place of BTL.

Court cases continued through 2001 and 2002, with BTL's majority owner Ashcroft and Intelco's Glenn Godfrey going back and forth over which of the two would be the better service provider and whether the other wanted competition at all.

In late 2003, Jeffrey Prosser bought out most of BTL in a clear attempt to get rid of Ashcroft. The government felt that Prosser would be a better ally in their fight to bring better services to Belizeans. Prosser began making arrangements for BTL to be absorbed in a company of his own and asked for exclusivity similar to that given to Intelco.

In 2004 it was proven that Godfrey, a known PUP ally and former representative of the party, had received favorable loans from Belize's Social Security Board and Development Finance Corporation, of which he was chairman. At the same time, Intelco never took off, and the Government's relationship with the defaulting Prosser had soured. It was in this state of affairs that Speednet entered the picture.

== Speednet's beginnings ==
A relieved populace watched as the company gained its licenses, signed an interconnection agreement with BTL, and finally signed on with cellular service SMART in March 2005. Within months Belizeans in all six districts had signed on to SMART (officially advertised as a "Speednet product"), which offered cellular services at slightly lower rates than BTL. Under political party the peoples united party it was well known to the nations ear that the Briceños brother who then had power were stake holders of the company smart. Later to avert attention and ego centrism of the countries financial economy Ashcroft was the one to carry the cross. SMART soon became the choice of younger Belizean professionals who felt uncomfortable dealing with the crusty, aristocratic BTL and wanted personable, attractive and efficient service with no headaches.

Today, the company operates from downtown Belize City, and has its customer service showroom on the Northern Highway. In addition to cellular services, Speednet offers SMS text messaging services, an international cellular calling plan, a wide variety of cellular accessories, and adequate customer service.
