= Trilogy International Partners =

Public wireless company

- Industry: Telecommunications
- Founded: 2005; 20 years ago
- Founder: John W. Stanton; Brad Horwitz; Theresa Gillespie
- Headquarters: Bellevue, Washington, USA
- Key people: John W. Stanton (Chairman); Brad Horwitz (CEO)
- Website: http://www.trilogy-international.com/

Trilogy International Partners, LLC is an American wireless telecommunications company based in Bellevue, Washington. The company was listed on the Toronto Stock Exchange.

In March 2024, it was announced that SG Enterprises II, LLC had acquired an 80.1% stake in the company for approximately $5 million.

== History ==
Trilogy was founded in 2005 by John W. Stanton, an American wireless businessman, and several associates. The founders previously managed Western Wireless, an American wireless operator, that merged with Alltel in 2005 for $6 billion.

Comcel Haiti, their company in Haiti, was sold to Digicel Group in March 2012. In 2015, Trilogy's Dominican Republic operations, Trilogy Dominicana (now Viva), were sold to Telemicro Group, a local firm.

In 2017, Trilogy listed on the Toronto Stock Exchange, through a take-over by a company on that exchange. As part of this transaction, the company raised $270 million. The company was listed on the TSX until 2024 when it was taken private by SG Enterprises II.

== Business ==
Trilogy owned two wireless telecommunications companies, 2degrees in New Zealand and Nuevatel in Bolivia.

2degrees is the third largest mobile provider in New Zealand, with 23% of the market as of 2017. 2degrees also provides fixed-line phone and broadband services, although it has a small market share for these services. Trilogy had a 51% stake in 2degrees, with remaining owners including Tesbrit BV.

Nuevatel is the third largest mobile provider in Bolivia, with a 24% market share as of 2017. Trilogy had a 72% interest in the company, with the remaining 28% percent belonging to local telephone cooperative COMTECO. Nuevatel operates under the brand name Viva.

Both companies were sold in 2022. While Trilogy only expected to receive a "nominal" amount for Nuevatel, the company expected proceeds of NZD 930 million from the sale of its majority stake in 2degrees.
