= WOM (Chile) =

Chilean telecommunications company

WOM S.A.

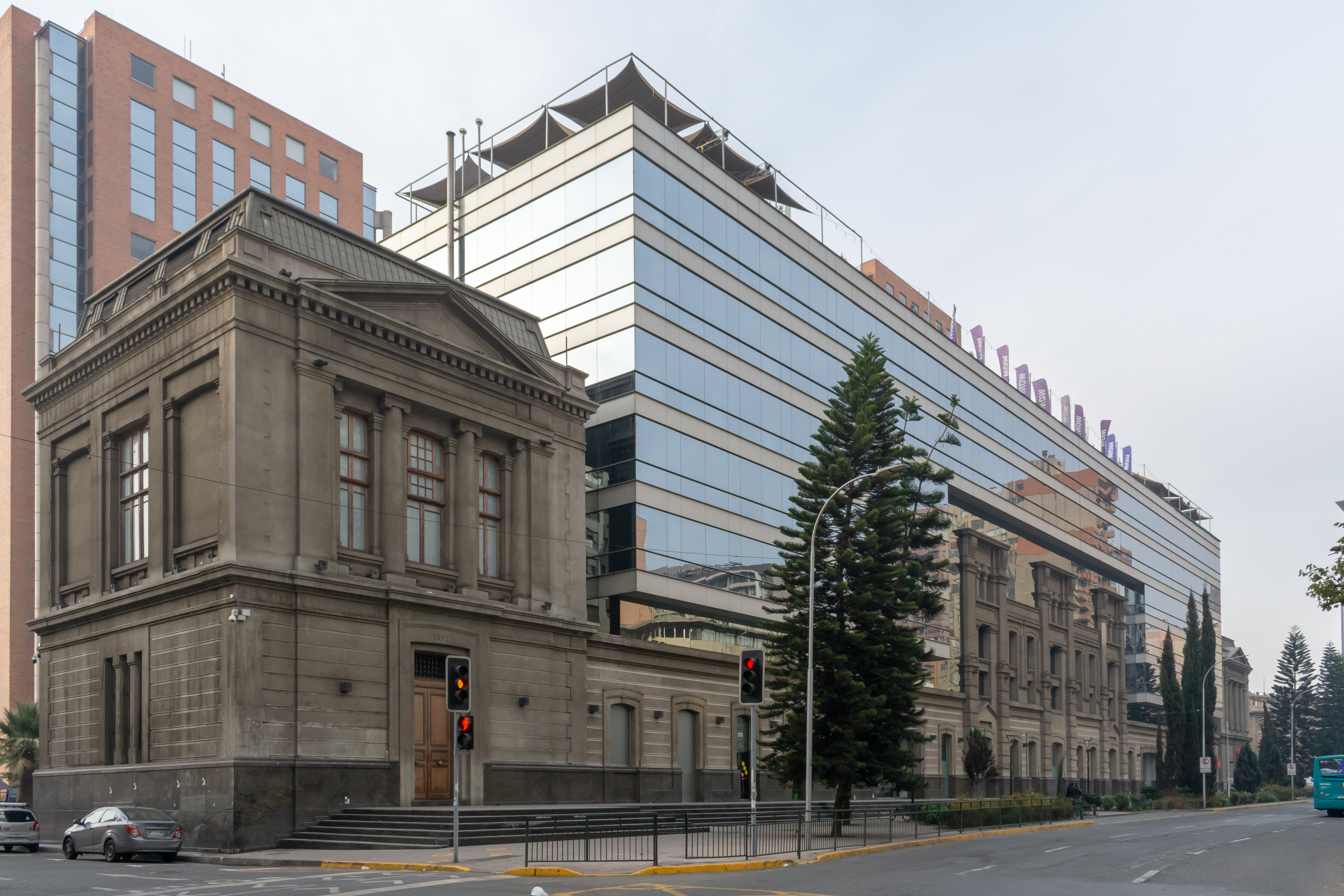
- WOM's headquarters in Santiago, Chile
- Company type: Public
- Industry: Telecommunication
- Founded: 1999; 27 years ago as Nextel Chile, July 7, 2015; 10 years ago as WOM
- Headquarters: General Mackenna 1369, Santiago, Chile
- Subsidiaries: WOM Colombia
- Website: https://www.wom.cl

WOM S.A. (previously known as Nextel Chile) is a Chilean telecommunications company. The company mainly provides mobile telephony, Internet service, television service and media streaming.

== History ==
=== Nextel Chile ===
Nextel Chile was founded in 1999 as a subsidiary of the American telecommunications company Nextel. Its intention to offer services as a mobile operator garnered negative reactions from the dominant mobile operators in Chile, who threatened to take legal action against it. Due to this, Nextel Chile only started offering mobile telephony in 2008, although it offered navigation through WAP, voice communication and text messaging before that. On those years, it focused primarily on an audience linked to the business world. Between 2010 and 2012, the company was considered one of the best companies to work in within Chile. It was known at the time for being the only one to provide a push-to-talk service, which was introduced in 2006 and was improved in 2012 with the introduction of a "high performance push to talk" (Called PRIP). In 2014, it was acquired by Fucata S.A., and became property of the Argentine Businessmen Sergio Szpolski and Matías Garfunkel. By late 2014, the company only held a marketshare of 1,54%.

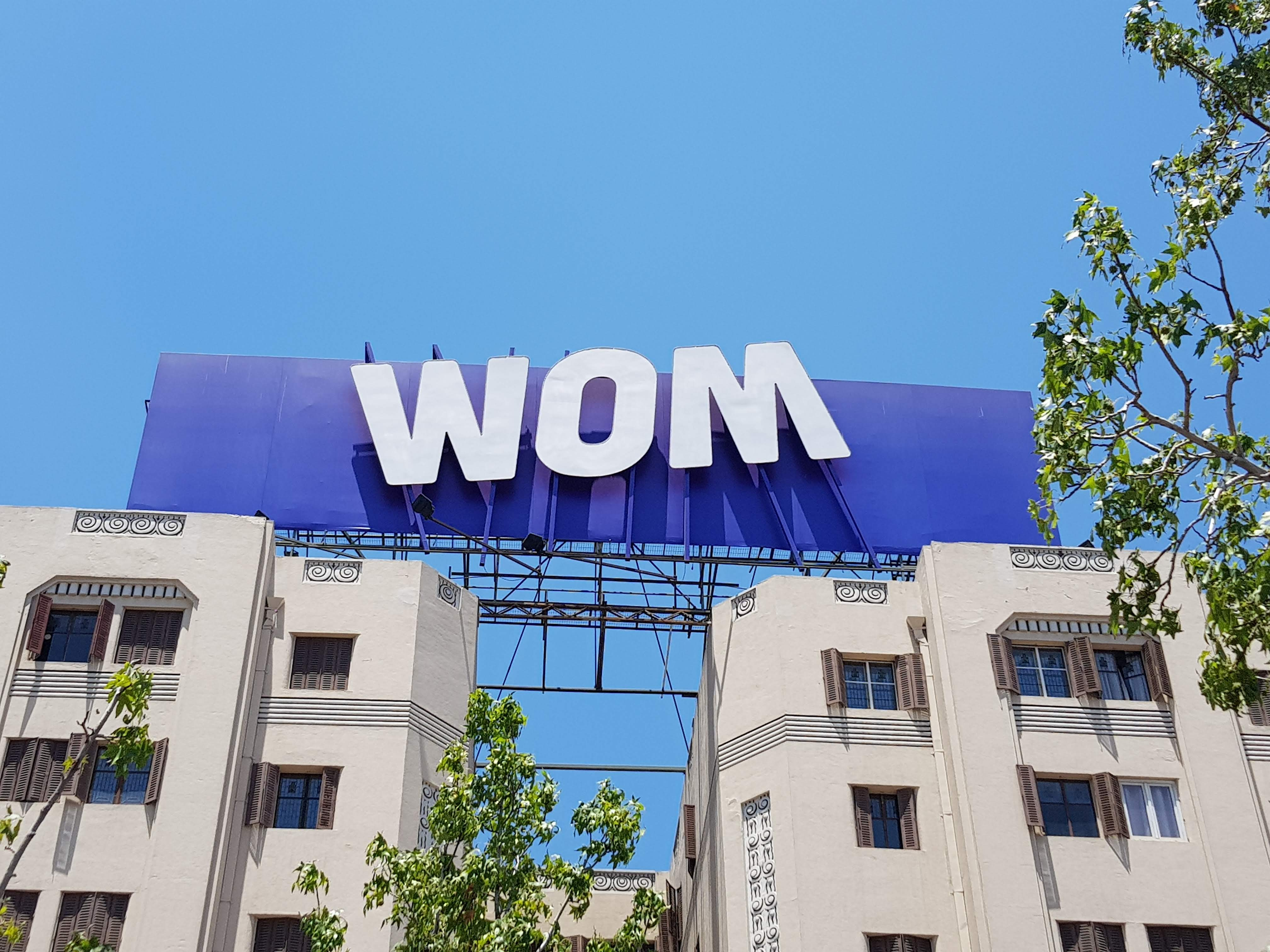
WOM advertisement on a building in Providencia, Chile.

=== WOM ===
On July 7, 2015, Nextel Chile was bought by the Novator Partners equity fund. The company was then renamed to WOM (an acronym of Word of Mouth) and Chris Bannister became CEO, becoming known as "Tío WOM" (meaning Uncle WOM in Spanish). Since then, the company has seen massive growth within Chile, achieving 1 million clients only 7 months after its purchase. That same year, it announced the introduction of 4G service, which it implemented in most mayor cities within only 2 months. In 2017, it surpassed 3 million clients, becoming one of the biggest telecommunication companies in Chile. In 2018, it achieved 4 million clients, and that same year, Bannister resigned as CEO. In 2019, it achieved 20% of the marketshare in Chile with over 5 million clients and became one of the first companies in Latin America to test 5G service. In 2020, for the first time since its purchase, WOM became profitable, after becoming the fourth biggest telecomunications company in Chile, with over 6 million clients. In 2021, WOM launched its IPTV service WOM TV, and in 2022, it launched 5G service across the entire country.

In 2024, WOM filed for Chapter 11 Bankruptcy in Delaware in an effort to undergo a corporate and financial restructuring due to short term liquidity problems. In March 2025, the company finished its restructuring and got out of the Chapter 11, with Bannister returning as CEO as part of the corporate restructuring.

== Controversy ==
In 2015, WOM aired a commercial featuring Evo Morales (then president of Bolivia) wearing flip-flops in front of a painting of a ship, struggling to "navigate" the web, then leaving Bolivia's presidential palace and telling Chilean reporters that they are spies. The commercial alluded to the fact that after Bolivia lost the War of the Pacific, its access to the sea got cut off, and that Morales had a verbal confrontation with Chilean reporters outside the Palacio Quemado, in which he called them "agents of the Chilean intelligence service". The commercial aired during a dispute between Bolivia and Chile in the International Court of Justice, where Bolivia petitioned a negotiation of the current borders to grant itself access to the sea. The Bolivian government protested the commercial, with the Ministry of Foreign Affairs asking the Chilean government to take action against the company.

In 2018, the company made a commercial featuring Venezuelan president Nicolás Maduro, where he is seen mourning Hugo Chávez in a church when a small bird approaches him. Maduro then claims that the bird was actually Chávez, and he starts communicating with him, only for the bird to cut to a sales pitch for WOM. The commercial was criticized by Venezuelans online, calling it a mockery of their country, with president Maduro calling it ridiculous and dismissing it as envy of Venezuela's "happy and free revolutionaries".
