= Algar Telecom =

Brazilian telecommunications company

- Type: Private
- Industry: Telecommunications
- Predecessor: Companhia de Telecomunicações do Brasil Central (CTBC)
- Founded: February 15, 1954; 72 years ago
- Founder: Alexandrino Garcia
- Headquarters: Uberlândia, Brazil
- Key people: Jean Borges (CEO)
- Products: Fixed and mobile telephony, Broadband Internet, Pay TV, Voice and data solutions, IT, Outsourcing, Videoconferencing, Clear Channel, SMS, IP Traffic and consultant media.
- Revenue: ▲ R$ 2,2 billion (2015)
- Net income: ▲ R$ 116 million (2015)
- Number of employees: 3,700 (2015)
- Parent: Grupo Algar
- Subsidiaries: Algar Celular S/A; Algar Multimídia S/A; Algar TI Consultoria S/A; Algar Mídia S/A; CTBC Serviços de Call Center S/A
- Website: algartelecom.com.br

Algar Telecom is a Brazilian telecommunications company present in the states of Goiás, Mato Grosso do Sul, Minas Gerais, Paraná, Rio de Janeiro, Rio Grande do Sul, Santa Catarina, São Paulo, and in the Federal District as well. The company is the only operator that remained private, even after the creation of Telebrás in the military regime, and it is characterized as the fifth largest company in the telecommunications segment. It serves more than one million and four hundred thousand customers - individuals, micro and small businesses, corporate customers, and carriers.

== History ==
Algar Telecom, headquartered in Uberlândia - State of Minas Gerais, is one of the companies of Grupo Algar and was founded with the name CTBC - Companhia Telefônica Brazil Central on February 15, 1954, by Alexandrino Garcia, who acquired Companhia Telefônica Teixeirinha. Alexandrino was 47 years old when he started the business in the telephony industry and began, at the time, to personally sell the services of the company.

Initially, the company worked with a focus on the countryside, in the well-known "Central Brazil," covering part of the states of Goiás, Mato Grosso do Sul, Minas Gerais, and São Paulo. Later, it started to cover the region of Alta Mogiana, in São Paulo, the east of Mato Grosso do Sul, the region of Triângulo Mineiro and Alto Paranaíba - Minas Gerais - and the southern region of the state of Goiás.

Its area of operation includes the main capitals of Brazil and their surroundings, including São Paulo, Campinas, Ribeirão Preto, São José do Rio Preto, Goiânia, Brasília, Belo Horizonte, Uberlândia, Rio de Janeiro, Curitiba, Balneário Camboriú, Florianópolis, and Porto Alegre, among others.

In 2007, the company made a public issue of debentures and became a publicly traded company, not listed on stock exchanges.

In 2010, it was granted a license to operate in the H Band, the last one available for 3G telephony. It may operate in the regions with DDDs (area codes) 34, 35 and 37. In cities such as Divinópolis, Itaúna, Araxá, Bom Despacho, Claudio, Poços de Caldas, and Itajubá, increasing its coverage area from 87 cities to 233.

In 2013, the operator has completed the strategic branding cycle of Grupo Algar (in 2009, Grupo Algar decided for a single-brand strategy, that is, all its businesses would have Algar as a name) with the evolution of its retail brand and the permanent replacement of the name CTBC by Algar Telecom.

In 2014, Algar Telecom won the frequency batch 5 of the 4G auction, in the range of 700 megahertz (MHz). The frequency awarded at the auction, organized by Anatel, has regional coverage and corresponds to the company's concession area, with a capacity of 10+10 MHz.

Also in 2014, Algar Telecom communicated to the market the signing of an agreement with Angola Cables, Antel, and Google, in order to start the construction of a new optic fiber submarine cable that will connect Brazil to the United States. The cable will come out from Santos (SP), pass through Fortaleza (CE), and will arrive in the city of Boca Raton (Florida, USA).

At the beginning of 2015, Algar Telecom selected Nokia Networks in order to launch its LTE services in the 700 MHz band and in order to modernize its 3G network – preparing the groundwork for the introduction of HD voice services in 2016. Nokia Networks signed a 5-year contract as the only supplier of Algar Telecom, in order to deliver and manage radio and core solutions, transforming the carrier's network infrastructure.

In 2015, the company also acquired Optitel, an IT and Telecommunication company based in Balneário Camboriú (state of Santa Catarina), strengthening its operations and expansion in the southern region of the country.

In December 2017, Grupo Algar announced the sale of 25% of its stake in Algar Telecom to the investment fund Archy, which is a subsidiary of Singapore's sovereign wealth fund GIC Private Limited. The sale is currently pending regulatory approval by Brazil's federal telecommunications regulatory agency Anatel as well as the Brazilian government's competition regulator CADE.

In December 2021, Algar Telecom was the first wireless carrier to launch a 5G network on exclusive spectrum for commercial operations in Brazil, using the 2.3 GHz band that it successfully bid on in the 5G auction in the prior month.

== Coverage Area ==
Algar Telecom is nowadays present in the main regions of Brazil, with 31,000 kilometers of optic fiber serving its 1.3 million clients in the states of Goiás, Mato Grosso do Sul, Minas Gerais, Paraná, Rio de Janeiro, Rio Grande do Sul, Santa Catarina, São Paulo, and the Federal District as well.

== See also ==
- List of internet service providers in Brazil
