= ETB (company) =

Colombian telecommunication company

Empresa de Telecomunicaciones de Bogotá
- Company type: Colombian Telecommunications
- Industry: Telecommunications
- Founded: 1884
- Founder: Jose Raimundo Martinez
- Headquarters: Carrera 8 No. 20 - 56 Floor 9, Bogotá, Colombia
- Area served: Colombia
- Key people: Diego Molano Vega (CEO/President); Carlos Fernando Galán (Bogota's mayor)
- Products: Telephony TV Internet
- Owner: Bogota's District (88%); Private Investors (12%)
- Website: http://etb.com

The Empresa de Telecomunicaciones de Bogotá, BVC: 5800&tipoMercado=1 ETB 5800) is one of the principal telecommunication companies in Colombia, principally in Cundinamarca, Tolima and Villavicencio. In 2012 there were almost 2,000,000 telephone lines with this company. Alex Javier Blanco Rivera has been CEO of ETB since December of 2022.
