= Movistar =

Telecommunication provider

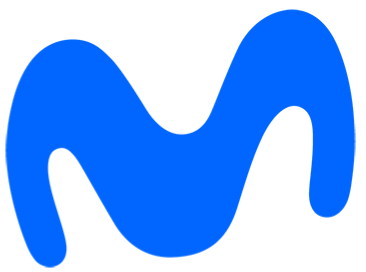
- Product type: Telecommunications
- Current owner: Telefónica
- Country: Spain
- Introduced: 25 July 1995; 31 years ago
- Discontinued: Latin America
- Related brands: O2; Vivo
- Markets: Spain; Venezuela
- Website: movistar.com

Movistar (Spanish pronunciation: [moβisˈtaɾ]) is a Spanish major telecommunications provider owned by Telefónica, operating in Spain and Hispanic American countries. It is the largest provider of landline, broadband, mobile services, and pay television (Movistar Plus+) in Spain. Movistar is the second-largest wireless carrier in Mexico, with 25.8 million subscribers as of January 2020.

== History ==
The Movistar brand has been in use in Spain since the launch of GSM services in 1995. The name became effective worldwide on April 5, 2005, after Telefónica purchased the BellSouth mobile operations branch in South America. After the purchase of O_{2} in 2005 by Telefónica, the company announced that the «O_{2}» brand would continue to be used in the United Kingdom and Germany, as a separate branch with its own board and management structure. Since 2011, Telefónica has sponsored a UCI ProTeam squad in cycling under the name of Movistar Team.

Since 2019, Telefónica has decided to divest all of Movistar's operations in Latin America, with Venezuela being the only country in Latin America who has Movistar and being directly owned by Telefónica (Movistar México is owned by a third-party company who continues to use the Movistar name under a license agreement, and Brazil uses the Vivo brand instead of Movistar).

== Movistar brand by country ==
Map of countries where the Movistar brand operates as of 2026 Current markets Markets where the brand is used under a licensing agreement Former markets

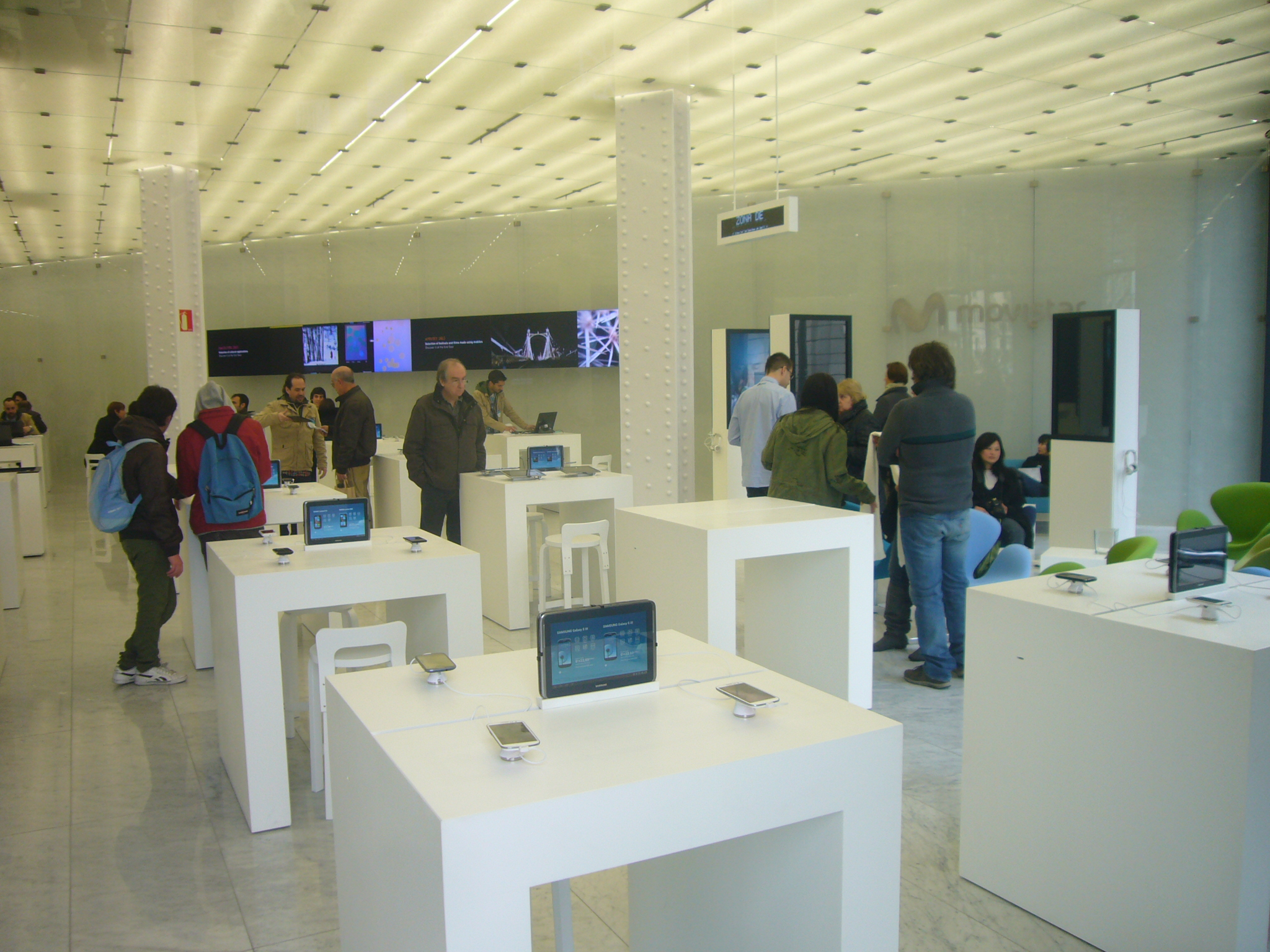
Movistar stand at the Mobile World Congress.

- Spain (formerly Telefónica MoviStar)
- Venezuela (formerly Telcel and Telcel BellSouth)

=== Former operations ===
- Argentina (acquired by Telecom Argentina, now operating as Personal due to their merger)
- Chile (acquired by Millicom, now operating as Tigo)
- Colombia (acquired by Millicom, now operating as Tigo due to their merger)
- Costa Rica (acquired by Liberty Latin America, now operating as Liberty)
- Ecuador (acquired by Millicom, now operating as Tigo)
- El Salvador (acquired by General International Telecom, continues operating the Movistar brand under license agreement with Telefónica)
- Guatemala (acquired by América Móvil, now operating as Claro due to their merger)
- Mexico (acquired by Oxio and Newfoundland Capital, continues operating the Movistar name under license agreement with Telefónica)
- Nicaragua (acquired by Millicom, now operating as Tigo)
- Panama (acquired by Millicom, now operating as Tigo)
- Peru (acquired by Integra Tec International, now operating as Integratel)
- Puerto Rico (acquired by Open Mobile, now operating as T-Mobile US due to their merger)
- Uruguay (acquired by Millicom, now operating as Tigo)

== Other brands by country ==
- Brazil (formerly Telesp and Telefônica, now under the Vivo brand)
- Germany (under the O_{2} brand)
- United Kingdom (under the O_{2} brand)

=== Former operations ===
- Czech Republic (under the O_{2} brand, acquired by PPF and continues operating the O_{2} brand under license agreement with Telefónica)
- Ireland (under the O_{2} brand, acquired by CK Hutchison Holdings and now operating as Three due to their merger)
- Slovakia (under the O_{2} brand, acquired by PPF and continues operating the O_{2} brand under license agreement with Telefónica)

== Advertisements ==
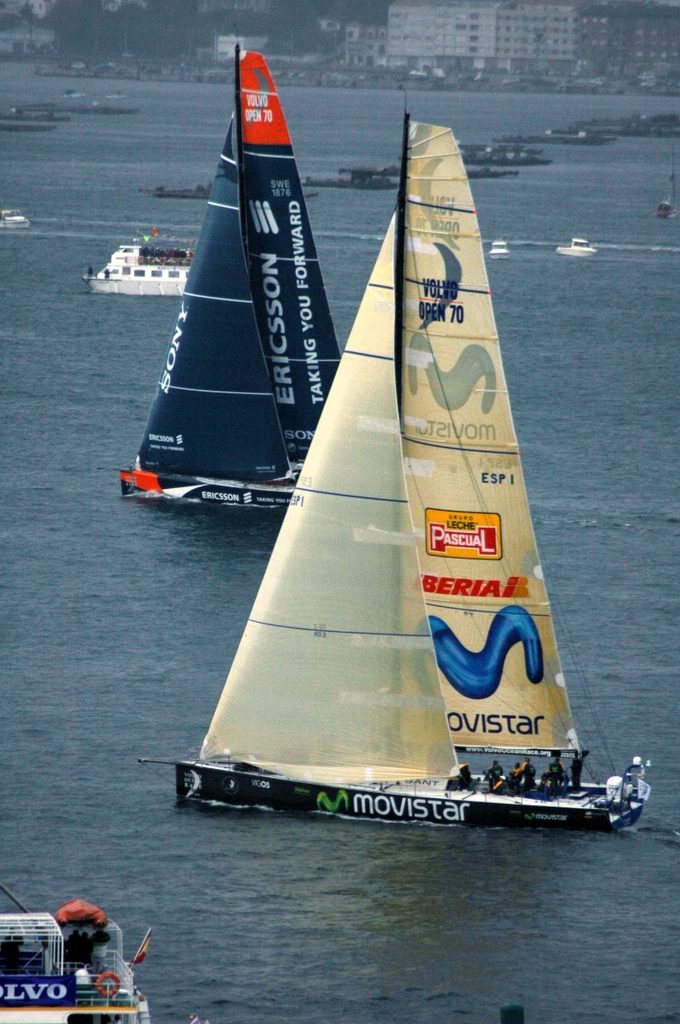
VO70 Class yacht Movistar racing in Leg 1 of the 2005 Volvo Ocean Race in Vigo, Spain

The 1983 song "Walking on Sunshine" by Katrina and the Waves was used by Telefónica to announce the unification of all its operation brands (Telefónica MoviStar, Bellsouth, Unifon, Telefónica Moviles, Telefónica Movil, and Movicom) in Latin America and Spain under the Movistar brand after the takeover of BellSouth's Latin America division. Movistar has also used the New Radicals' hit "You Get What You Give" and "Two Princes" by Spin Doctors. Currently "Hey, Soul Sister" by Train is in advertising and other versions of the song are also used in audiovisual advertisements.

== See also ==
- Movistar Team
- List of mobile network operators
- List of telecommunications regulatory bodies
