= NCN Linden =

- Country: Guyana
- Broadcast area: National
- Headquarters: Linden

Programming
- Language: English

Ownership
- Owner: National Communications Network, Guyana
- Sister channels: NCN Television

History
- Launched: 2019
- Former names: Linden Broadcasting Network (2019–2021)

Availability

Terrestrial
- VHF: Analog VHF 13

NCN Linden (channel 13) is a local television station owned by the National Communications Network, catering the city of Linden, capital of the Upper Demerara-Berbice region. It operates a local television station as well as relays of the Guyana Learning Channel and the national NCN service.

== History ==
The frequency used by NCN's national service was formerly (as of 2006) occupied by RCA Channel 8, a commercial station. The city was also served by two 25-channel cable companies (Linden Cable Network and Infinity Communications). Shortly before that, NCN was building two television transmitters in the Berbice area, while two of its competitors (VCT Network and CNS TV 6) were showing their interest in establishing relay stations there. Eventually, during 2006, NCN took over channel 13 (which was another local station), replacing it with a new NCN station for Linden. The two NCN stations in Linden (8 and 13) resumed operation on December 16, 2007, after a fire that rendered the NCN transmitting station at Richmond Hill inoperable, moving to Watooka. In July 2012, locals demanded that the station should return to the hands of the Green Construction Group, resuming local programming, which ultimately never happened. The GNBA granted a license to Linden in November 2015, but, by then, NCN's control of the frequency had been relinquished.

After NCN left channel 13, test transmissions of a new station (Linden Television) began on 18 April 2016, but its launch was frequently postponed due to management problems. The need for a television station independent from NCN came due to complaints from locals who wanted an alternative to what was considered a one-sided broadcaster favoring the ruling government. In March 2018, the set-up of the station was still at a stalemate, whose board had not convened in one year.

On 1 March 2019, the Linden Broadcasting Network received approval from the government and was commissioned by the president on 6 October 2019. In December 2019, it was allowed that NCN would be carried on channel 8, as well as, by way of Deed of Gift, having its offices in the LBN building. Both broadcasters did not settle on an agreement to sign the deed, causing the termination of the arrangement on 31 March 2020. With this, the station was given back to NCN and renamed NCN Linden.
