= Television in Guyana =

Television was introduced to Guyana in 1980, making it the last country in South America to do so. Initially, there was only one commrecial subscription station, VCT Network, on UHF channel 28. WRHM became the first station to begin free-to-air broadcasts in the mid-1980s; the government followed with Guyana Television in 1988.

== History ==
Anthony Vieira opened Vieira Communications Television (or VCT Network) in May 1980. Since the station relied on subscriptions, few people owned a television set and descramblers were only owned by the elite. There would be no unscrambled television broadcasts until the mid-1980s, when WRHM opened on the VHF band.

The government launched its own television service, Guyana Television, on 1 January 1988, using a transmitter donated from Canada. As of 1992, it was the only station to work under legal requirements.

New TV stations appeared in the 1990s, at a time of economic depression. The VHF-UHF frequency plan was reassigned (from 2-4-6-7-9-10-12 to 2-4-6-7-9-11-13) in Georgetown in October 1996. The Guyana Learning Channel launched in April 2011.

== Digital television ==
NCN as of 2024 is the most advanced network regarding digital infrastructure. Aside the main NCN channel, it also owns NCN Sports.

GLC also owns a multiplex with six channels.
