= Digital terrestrial television =

Broadcast television technology

Digital terrestrial television (DTT, DTV, or DTTV) is a broadcast technology that transmits television signals digitally over the air, replacing analog transmission methods. It has become the primary form of free-to-air broadcasting in many countries, offering improved picture quality and the capacity to carry multiple channels within a single frequency. Reception typically requires a television antenna and a compatible receiver, such as a HD/UHD TV or set-top box.

The conversion from analog to digital broadcasting, known as the digital transition or analog switch-off (ASO), began with experimental transmissions in the 1990s. By the mid-2000s, many governments had established timelines for phasing out analog signals, with deadlines for the changeover, often including subsidies for equipment upgrades and limited exemptions for remote areas. Regional technical standards differ widely. North America and South Korea developed ATSC 1 and ATSC 3.0, while Europe and most of Africa and Oceania primarily use DVB-T and DVB-T2. Japan and much of Central and South America adopted ISDB-T and ISDB-Tb, and China operates the DTMB standard. Some of these standards also support mobile reception and interactive features. By late 2024, the International Telecommunication Union and DVB/EBU reported that more than 160 countries had completed their DTV transition, while some states were still in various transition phases.

Digital terrestrial television continues to play an important role in global media distribution. It is particularly significant for audiences who rely on it for regional news and live sports, despite competition from multichannel video programming distributors (MVPD)s and the rapid growth of over-the-top streaming (OTT) services. Several countries are adopting newer standards that offer improved video resolution and add functions that link over-the-air signals with online platforms. Additionally, over-the-air television is also used to carry pertinent emergency alerts during natural disasters and other crises.

== Transmission ==
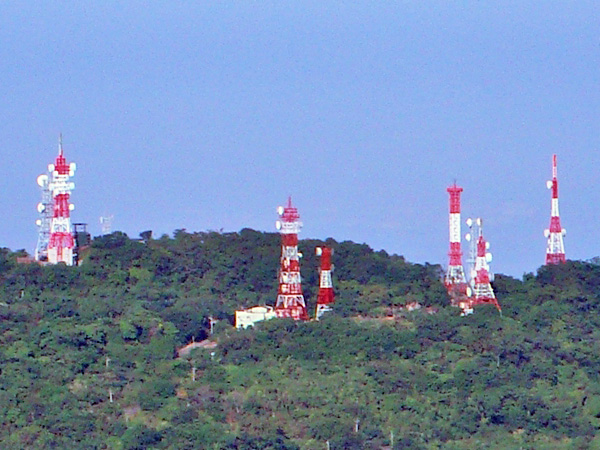
DTT transmitters located at Mount Zhentou in Tainan, Taiwan

Digital terrestrial television is transmitted using radio frequencies through terrestrial space in the same way as the former analog television systems, with the primary difference being the use of multiplex transmitters to allow reception of multiple services (TV, radio stations or data) on a single frequency (such as a UHF or VHF channel). The amount of data that can be transmitted (and therefore the number of channels) is directly affected by channel capacity and the modulation method of the transmission.

North America and South Korea use the ATSC standard with 8VSB modulation, which has similar characteristics to the vestigial sideband modulation used for analog television. This provides considerably more immunity to interference, but it is not immune to multipath distortion, and also does not provide for single-frequency network operation (which is in any case not a requirement in the United States).

The modulation method used in DVB-T is COFDM, with either 64 or 16-state Quadrature Amplitude Modulation (QAM). In general, 64QAM is capable of transmitting at a greater bit rate, but it is more susceptible to interference. 16- and 64QAM constellations can be combined in a single multiplex, providing a controllable degradation for more important program streams. This is called hierarchical modulation. DVB-T (and even more so DVB-T2) is tolerant of multipath distortion and are designed to work in single-frequency networks.

Developments in video compression have resulted in improvements to the original discrete cosine transform (DCT) based H.262 MPEG-2 video coding format, which has been surpassed by H.264/MPEG-4 AVC and more recently H.265 HEVC. H.264 enables three high-definition television services to be coded into a 24 Mbit/s DVB-T European terrestrial transmission channel. DVB-T2 increases this channel capacity to typically 40 Mbit/s, allowing even more services.

== Reception ==
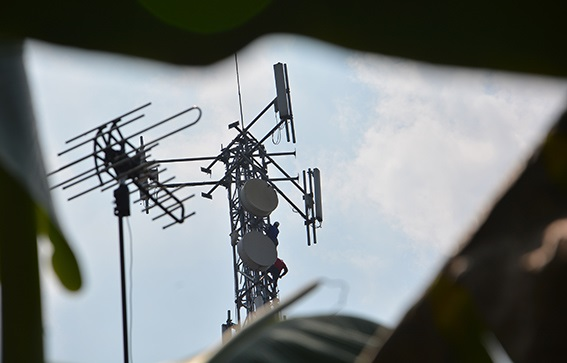
Digital terrestrial TV antenna used in Indonesia

Digital terrestrial television is received either via a digital set-top box (STB), TV gateway, or more commonly now, an integrated tuner in a television set, that operates on the signal received via a television antenna. These devices often include digital video recorder (DVR) functionality.

Due to frequency planning issues, an aerial capable of receiving different channel groups, like a wideband antenna, may be required if the digital signal multiplexes lie outside the reception capabilities of the originally installed aerial. Indoor aerials are more likely to be affected by these issues.

== Digital terrestrial television around the world ==
=== DTT broadcasting systems by country ===
DTT broadcasting systems by country, as of 2024.

=== Asia ===
==== Afghanistan ====
Afghanistan introduced digital terrestrial television in 2014, beginning with test transmissions in Kabul on four UHF channels in June. Official DVB-T2 broadcasts were launched on 31 August of that year. The initial rollout used GatesAir transmission equipment. As of 2025, digital service is only available in limited areas and analog broadcasts remain widespread. No formal transition plan has been announced.

==== Bangladesh ====
Bangladesh launched its first DTH service on 28 April 2016 using ISDB-T/MPEG-4 with GS Group as the service provider. The DTH service is branded as RealVU, and its launch was carried out in partnership with Beximco. GS Group acts as a supplier and integrator of its in-house hardware and software solutions for the operator in accordance with modern digital television standard. RealVU provides more than 120 TV channels in both SD and HD. The digital TV set-top boxes developed by GS Group offer functions such as PVR, time-shifting, and an EPG.

==== India ====
India adopted the DVB-T standard in 1999, with initial broadcasts by Doordarshan beginning on 26 January 2003 in Delhi, Mumbai, and other major cities. Analog transmission was discontinued in 2018–2023. Private broadcasters are not permitted to use over-the-air platforms and instead must rely on MVPD and OTT services for distribution.

The network was later upgraded to DVB-T2 and DVB-H, with over 190 high-power and 400 low-power transmitters approved for deployment by 2017. As of 2025, Doordarshan continues to operate DVB-T2 services in 16 cities, including the four major metros. The platform offers free-to-air access to DD National, DD News, DD Bharati, DD Sports, and regional channels. Reception is supported via compatible televisions and mobile devices equipped with DVB-T2 tuners or dongles.

==== Israel ====
Israel completed its digital switchover in March 2011, becoming the first country in the Middle East to discontinue analog television. The Idan+ platform, operated by the Second Authority for Television and Radio, provides six SD channels, two HD channels from the Israeli Public Broadcasting Corporation (Kan 11 and Makan 33), and roughly 30 national and regional radio stations.

As of 2025, the system remains in operation using DVB-T and DVB-T2 standards. Legislative changes in 2024 and 2025 expanded the number of available channels and modified regulatory oversight. These reforms included exemptions from distribution fees for commercial broadcasters and proposals to restructure or privatize public broadcasting. Technical upgrades in early 2025 required viewers to adopt DVB-T2 capable devices.

==== Japan ====
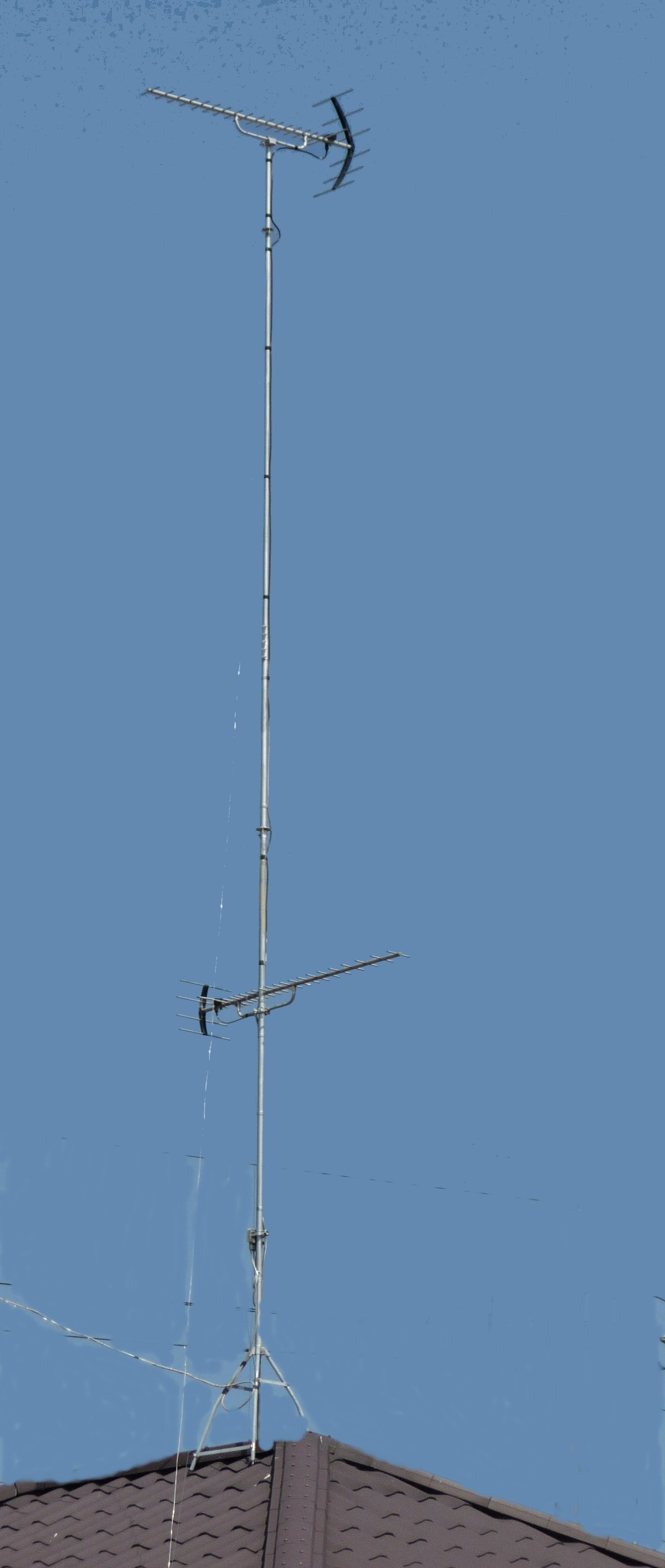
Rooftop DTT antennas aimed at the Tokyo Tower and a local mux before the Tokyo Skytree opened.

Japan completed its nationwide transition from analog to digital terrestrial television (DTT) on 24 July 2011, becoming the first Asian country to do so. The Ministry of Internal Affairs and Communications (MIAC) and the DPA set specifications for "simplified DTT tuners" priced under 5,000 yen on 25 December 2007 to facilitate the transition and prevent the disposal of analog-only TV sets. MIAC estimated that up to 14 million traditional analog TV sets would remain in use after the complete transition.

On 20 December 2007, the Japan Electronics and Information Technology Industries Association introduced the Dubbing 10 digital right management system for DTT broadcasting, allowing viewers to copy entire programs up to nine times, with one final transferable copy. The system launched on 4 July 2008 after negotiations with the Japanese Society for Rights of Authors, Composers and Publishers. By March 2008, the DPA reported 32.7 million ISDB-T-capable television sets in Japan, excluding mobile 1seg units, and MIAC reported that 43.7% of households owned DTT compatible receivers, up from 27.8% a year earlier. Full coverage was projected by April 2011.

On 3 September 2009, MIAC announced a tender to procure 5,000–8,000 simplified DTT tuners with remote controls for a city-wide analog-to-digital transition test in Suzu, Ishikawa to be delivered by the end of November. Based on this rehearsal, analog transmissions in Suzu and parts of Noto were suspended for 48 hours between noon on 22 January 2010 and noon on 24 January 2010. On 24 July 2010, at noon, analog broadcasts ended in Suzu and parts of Noto (about 8,800 homes) ahead of the national switchover scheduled for 24 July 2011; MIAC monitored the test to identify transition issues.

As of late 2025, Japan's digital terrestrial television (DTT) system is fully operational, providing nationwide coverage. Over-the-air broadcasts remain popular for reaching audiences, offering news, entertainment, and emergency information. Ultra High Definition (UHD) programming is also available over DTT, allowing viewers to access high-resolution content without internet streaming.

==== Malaysia ====
Malaysia began its transition to DTV in January 2014 and was completed in October 2019. The service is operated by MYTV Broadcasting under the myFreeview brand and regulated by the Malaysian Communications and Multimedia Commission (MCMC). As of 2025, myFreeview offers 15 free television channels and six radio stations nationwide. Reception is available via DVB-T2 set-top boxes or digital TVs. The platform remains the country's only free-to-air OTA service, with satellite and IPTV dominating commercial broadcasting. The MCMC has also launched initiatives to modernize broadcast infrastructure, though no major changes have been implemented since the 2019 transition.

==== Maldives ====
The Maldives has chosen the Japanese-Brazilian standard ISDB-Tb.

==== Philippines ====
The Philippines began its transition to digital terrestrial television (DTT) in 2010 when the National Telecommunications Commission (NTC) announced the adoption of the Japanese ISDB-T International standard. The first fully operational digital TV channel was Channel 49, operated by the religious group Iglesia ni Cristo.

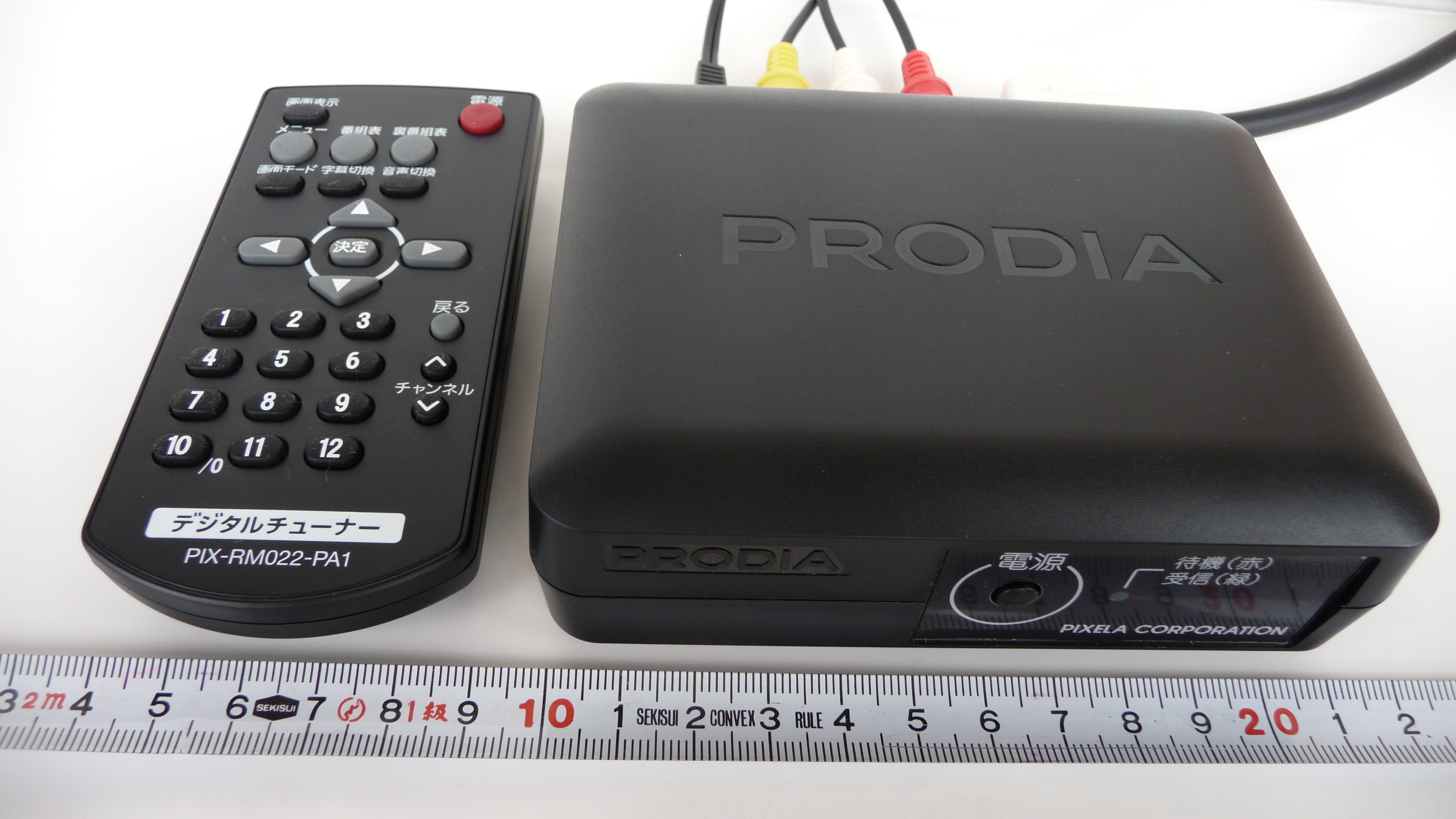
Simple and low cost ISDB-T Set-top box (tuner) with remote control

On 11 February 2015, ABS-CBN launched ABS-CBN TV Plus, also known as the "Mahiwagang Blackbox." The digital TV box was initially distributed to viewers of ABS-CBN Channel 2, DZMM, and DZMM TeleRadyo. Digital television transition began on 28 February 2017, with DZOZ-TV of ZOE Broadcasting Network being the first station to permanently shut down analog terrestrial transmissions. The NTC initially aimed to complete the analog switch-off by 2023, but the deadline was extended to 2025 for Mega Manila and 2026 for other regions.

Other broadcasters also launched digital services. Solar Entertainment Corporation introduced Easy TV in May 2018, which ceased operations in September 2019. GMA Network launched the GMA Affordabox in October 2020 and introduced two sub-channels, Heart of Asia Channel and Hallypop. TV5 Network, Inc. launched Sulit TV in September 2021, featuring TV5, One Sports, and RPTV.

As of 2025, the NTC continues to oversee the transition from analog to digital terrestrial television, with ongoing efforts to complete the analog switch-off in Mega Manila and nationwide. It was set announced that analog television to shutdown in November 2026 in Mega Manila.

==== Singapore ====
Singapore adopted the DVB-T2 standard in 2012, with monopoly Free-to-air broadcaster Mediacorp offering all seven of its services via DTT in 2013. Mediacorp ended analogue television service shortly after midnight on 2 January 2019.

==== Sri Lanka ====
Sri Lanka has chosen the Japanese-Brazilian standard ISDB-Tb.

==== Thailand ====
In 2005, the Ministry of Information announced a plan to digitalise nationwide free-to-air television broadcasts led by MCOT. Trial broadcasts ran from December 2000 to May 2001 with 1,000 households in the Bangkok Metropolitan Area. According to the Deputy Minister of Information, the trial received very positive feedback

Information Minister Sontaya Kunplome said full digitization would complete by 2012 as part of a three-year restructuring plan. Once equipped with a Set-top box or iDTV set, each household could receive up to 19 channels with seven from MCOT and the remainder from private broadcasters such as Channel 3.

Thailand and the rest of ASEAN (excluding the Philippines) adopted DVB-T as their DTT standard, targeting complete analogue switch-off by 2015. The final analogue service, Channel 3, ceased transmission on 26 March 2020.

As of mid-2025, Thailand's digital terrestrial television platform is fully operational in all provinces, with over 98% of households receiving digital signals via set-top boxes or digital televisions. The Association of Digital Television Broadcasting urged the NBTC to expedite decisions on multiplex capacity and migration to DVB-T2 to accommodate 4K services and interactive features. In response, the NBTC convened a focus-group session in May 2025 to gather industry and consumer input before publishing the draft roadmap in the third quarter of 2025. Continued viewership growth has prompted DTT operators to offer additional services, ranging from enhanced emergency alert systems to expanded mobile streaming and broadcast datacasting, as they seek to stabilize revenues ahead of license auction discussions in 2028.

=== Oceania ===
==== Australia ====
Digital terrestrial television was introduced in Australia in January 2001 using the DVB-T standard. The transition from analog PAL broadcasts was completed nationwide on 10 December 2013. Freeview Australia coordinates and distributes over-the-air digital TV across the country. The platform also operates a free OTT service and mobile apps under the FreeviewPlus and On Demand TV branding. As of 2025, DVB-T remains the operational standard, though DVB-T2 migration planning is underway. Limited 4K trials have been conducted in select markets, but no formal launch has taken place.

==== New Zealand ====
New Zealand launched its DVB-T based digital terrestrial television broadcasts in April 2008. The full transition from analog modulation was completed by December 2013, following a staged regional switch-off. Freeview provides the country's free-to-air digital platform. Unlike Australia's OTA only system, New Zealand's Freeview also includes satellite coverage for rural areas. DVB-T remains in use across all regions, and no formal upgrade path to DVB-T2 has been outlined, as of 2025.

=== Europe ===
==== European Union ====
As of 2001, two countries had introduced DTT: Sweden and Spain. Their total TV viewership market shares were 2.3%, and 3.5% respectively. The EU recommended in May 2005 that its Member States cease all analogue television transmissions by 1 January 2012. Some EU member states decided to complete the transition as early as 2006 for Luxembourg and the Netherlands, and 2007 for Finland. Latvia stopped broadcasting analogue television from 1 June 2010. Poland completed the transition on 23 July 2013 and Bulgaria completed the transition on 30 September 2013. Malta switched on 1 November 2011. ASO was mostly completed in Europe in 2013 though small hilly underpopulated isolated terrain areas awaited DTT rollout beyond that date. Many television viewers' equipment in Europe might experience interference and blocking because of 800 MHz broadband usage. As of 2018, DTT is the main TV reception for 27.7 percent of the EU27 countries. Croatia, Greece, Italy, and Spain all have DTT penetration over 50 percent of total TV reception.

==== Bulgaria ====
Bulgaria launched a free-to-air platform in the Sofia region starting in November 2004. The standards chosen are DVB-T and MPEG4 AVC/H.264 compression format. DVB-T2 will not be used at this time. The Communications Regulatory Commission (CRC) has said that it received 6 bids for the licence to build and operate Bulgaria's two nationwide DTT networks. A second licence tender for the operation of 3 DTT multiplexes was open until 27 May 2009. Following the closing of this process, Hannu Pro, part of Silicon Group, and with Baltic Operations has secured the license to operate three DTT multiplexes in Bulgaria by the country's Communications Regulatory Commission (CRC) Bulgaria officially completed the transition to digital broadcasting on Monday, 30 September 2013.

==== Belgium ====
Flanders has no free-to-air television, as Dutch-language public broadcaster VRT shut off its DVB-T service on 1 December 2018 citing minimal usage. VRT cited that only 1 percent of Flemish households made use of the terrestrial signal and that it was not worth the €1 million to upgrade to DVB-T2. After some outcry over the loss of terrestrial coverage, VRT's channels were added to TV Vlaanderen's subscription DVB-T2 package called Antenne TV alongside all major Dutch-language commercial channels.

French language public broadcaster RTBF remains available in Brussels and Wallonia via DVB-T transmissions.

95 percent of Belgium is covered by cable, well above the EU28 average of 45.1 percent, which can explain the low terrestrial usage in the country.

==== Denmark ====
Denmark launched digital terrestrial television in March 2006 following several years of public trials. The analogue signal was switched off nationwide at midnight on 1 November 2009.

As of 2025, five national multiplexes operate using DVB-T2 and MPEG-4, offering a mix of SD and HD channels. MUX 1 is free-to-air and operated by DIGI-TV, a joint venture between DR and TV 2. MUX 2 through MUX 5 are run by Boxer and carry pay television services. The transition to DVB-T2 was completed in June 2020, when remaining DVB-T services were shut down and the 700 MHz band was reallocated to mobile broadband.

==== Finland ====
Finland launched DTT in 2001 and terminated analogue transmissions nationwide on 1 September 2007. Finland has successfully launched a mixture of pay and free-to-air DTT services. Digita operates the DTT and Mobile Terrestrial networks and rents capacity to broadcasters on its network on a neutral market basis. Digita is owned by TDF (France). The pay-DTT service provider Boxer has acquired a majority stake in the leading Finnish pay DTT operator PlusTV which offers several commercial channels for a subscription. It started in October 2006. Boxer already provides pay-DTT services in Sweden and Denmark.

Three nationwide multiplexes are granted to DNA and Anvia for DVB-T2 for high-definition and standard-definition channel (MPEG4).

==== France ====
France's Télévision Numérique Terrestre (TNT) offers 25 free national channels, one pay channel (Paris Première), and up to four free local channels. Free-to-view satellite services began simulcasting the TNT lineup launched in June 2007. By December 2008, DTT penetration was projected to reach 89% of Metropolitan France. The nationwide transition from analogue to digital television began in early 2010 and was completed by late 2011, with the final analogue switch-off taking place on 30 November 2011.

Since 12 December 2012, TNT has included a mix of free and pay high definition channels using the MPEG-4 format. While most HD services continue to be broadcast via DVB-T, France began transitioning to DVB-T2 in January 2024 to enable Ultra HD and future service enhancements.

==== Germany ====
Germany launched a free-to-air platform region-by-region, starting in Berlin in November 2002. The analogue broadcasts were planned to cease soon after digital transmissions were started. Berlin became completely digital on 4 August 2003, with other regions completing between then and 2008. Digital switchover has been completed throughout Germany as of 2 December 2008, and services are now available to 100% of the population following the update of infill for the remaining 10% of transmitters by Media Broadcast, who set up broadcast antennas at 79 transmission sites and installed 283 new transmitter stations. More services are to be launched on DTT and some pay DTT channels are or have been launched in various areas, such as Stuttgart and soon Leipzig.

==== Greece ====
The Hellenic Broadcasting Corporation (ERT) began pilot digital terrestrial television (DTT) transmissions in January 2006 under the brand ERT Digital, offering the channels Prisma+, Cine+, Sport+ and retransmission of Cyprus' RIK Sat in selected areas including Athens, Thessaloniki and parts of Thessaly. By 2011, ERT operated two multiplexes: one carrying Vouli Tileorasi, Prisma+, CineSport+, with the second mux using DVB-T2 and carrying ERT1, ERT2 Sport, ERT3, plus the then new high definition service ERT HD using MPEG-4. ERT HD began its initial full HD transmissions in April 2011.

Commercial broadcasters implemented the transition through the consortium Digea, which began commercial digital transmissions in September 2009 from the Xylokastro transmitter and progressively activated services in Thessaloniki, Athens and other regions through 2011–2013. Regional broadcasters organized under Digital Union also launched DTT services from 2010 onwards, providing additional regional and local channels in Thessaloniki, Crete, Patras and other areas.

Analog broadcasts in Athens were discontinued in August 2011 and by the full completion of the analog sign-off process in February 2015, Greece operated well over 150 digital transmitter sites and achieved national population coverage in excess of 90% through its combined public and privately operated multiplexes.

As of 2025, Greece's digital terrestrial television remains popular, with Digea continuing to manage the majority of over the air stations and infrastructure. Along with the ERT broadcasting it's highly viewed multiplexes, offering national and regional programming throughout the country.

==== Hungary ====
Experimental DTT broadcast has started in December 2008. The program of Duna Televízió was broadcast during the trials. Originally, analog television was planned to be shut down on 1 January 2012, but this deadline was first pushed out to 2014 and then brought forward to 2013. Analogue broadcast was terminated at 12:30 pm, on 31 July 2013 in the central part of Hungary, and in October 2013 in the rest of the country. M1, M2, Duna TV, Duna World, RTL Klub, TV2 and Euronews are available as free-view. M1, M2, and Duna TV are also available in HD.

On both of the 2013 shutoff dates, all analog channels ceased normal programming at 12:30 pm and showed a silent ASO information screen that had a phone number to call for help. It was kept on for a few days, after which the analog transmitters were permanently shut down.

==== Ireland ====
The country completed its analogue terrestrial switch‑off on 24 October 2012, replacing it with the national DTT platform branded as Saorview. The platform is operated by RTÉ and carries a mix of channels from RTÉ, Virgin Media Television, TG4, and other broadcasters. Several critics have argued that Saorview's limited line‑up and patchy adoption left it overshadowed by subscription platforms, while others note that it still provides widespread free access to public service broadcasting. The platform is received in more than a third of Irish homes, either as the main service or alongside satellite and cable.

As of 2025, Saorview remains the country's free‑to‑air backbone, with viewing increasingly supplemented by mobile and smart TV applications. Trials of DVB-I have been carried out to test integration of broadcast and internet delivery. Simultaneously, discussions on a future migration to DVB-T2 have also taken place, although no timetable has been set. International agreements have confirmed that OTA television in Ireland will continue to have use of the UHF band beyond 2030.

==== Italy ====
Italy phased out its analogue terrestrial network region by region between 2008 and 2012, completing the transition to digital broadcasting in July 2012. The system used DVB-T with MPEG2 for standard definition and H.264 for high definition, with audio usually in MPEG1. Frequencies were allocated to support single-frequency networks. Alongside the established free‑to‑air channels, new pay‑per‑view services were introduced, and RAI launched an 1080i channel that carried major events such as the Olympic Games and the FIFA World Cup.

By late 2025 the focus has shifted to the migration toward DVB-T2 with HEVC compression. National multiplexes have begun the changeover, but the process remains incomplete and has drawn criticism from local broadcasters who argue they are disadvantaged by delays. Reports describe the transition as uncertain and lacking a firm timetable, with regulators and industry still debating how to balance broadcast capacity. Similar to other nations, broadcasters are increasingly combining terrestrial signals with online streaming to maintain viewership.

==== Luxembourg ====
Luxembourg launched DTT services in April 2006. The national service was launched in June 2006. On 1 September 2006, Luxembourg became the first European country to transition completely to DTT. Luxe TV, a niche theme based station, soon began broadcasting on the Luxembourg DTT platform, transmitted from the Dudelange transmitter. The aim was to reach audiences in some parts of Germany as well as in Luxembourg.

==== Netherlands ====
The Netherlands launched its DTT service on 23 April 2003, and terminated analogue transmissions nationwide on 11 December 2006. KPN owns Digitenne, which provides a mix of FTA public channels and paid DTT services. KPN started to switch its digital terrestrial television platform Digitenne to the DVB-T2 HEVC standard in October 2018, this transition completed on 9 July 2019.

==== Poland ====
DTT launch in Poland was scheduled for Autumn 2009. Regulatory disagreements delayed its tender and approach until resolved, and the multiplexes available for DTT were reduced to 3, and the 2nd was licensed in the Autumn of 2009. The reduction from 5 to 3 enabled mobile TV and broadband to get more spectrum allocation. Muxes 2 and 3 therefore, had limited coverage until ASO. Polsat, TVN, TV4, and TV Puls have officially applied to reserve space on the country's first multiplex set to start in September. Wirtualne Media is given as the source of the story. The public broadcaster's three main channels, TVP1, TVP2, and TVP Info, had already been allocated capacity on the multiplex.

Poland ended its television broadcast in analogue on 23 July 2013. A mobile TV license has also been awarded in Poland to Info TV FM to use DVB-H standard.

==== Portugal ====
Portugal launched its DTT service on 29 April 2009, available to around 20% of the Portuguese population, and Portugal Telecom expected to reach 80% of the population by the end of 2009. Airplus TV Portugal, which was set up to compete for a licence to manage Portugal's pay-TV DTT multiplexes, dissolved as it did not get the license, and a Portuguese court ruled not to suspend the process for the awarding of a licence to Portugal Telecom, based on a complaint submitted by Airplus TV Portugal. After Airplus TV Portugal was dissolved, Portugal Telecom informed that it will not honour the pay-TV DTT multiplexes licence obligations. ANACOM, the Portuguese communications authority, accepted. Portugal thus has only one active multiplexer.

==== Romania ====
In Romania, broadcasting regulations have been amended so that DTT service providers have only a single licence rather than the two previously required by the National Audiovisual Council (CNA). DTT services were launched in December 2009 using the MPEG-4 (H.264 AVC) compression format following the Ministry of Communications publication of a strategic plan for the transition to digital broadcasting. According to Media Express, it envisaged a maximum of five national UHF multiplexes, a national VHF multiplex, and a multiplex allocated to regional and local services, all in accordance with the ITU Geneva Conference RRC-06 reports BroadbandTVNews.

The Ministry of Communications (MCSI) estimated that 49% of Romania's 7.5 million households got TV from cable and 27% from DTH services in Romania, while terrestrial TV was used by 18% of the TV households. 6% are reported as not able to receive TV transmissions. Subsidies were offered for those below a certain income to assist switchover for them. Switchover was scheduled for January 2012.

Romkatel, the local representative of Kathrein, has since been awarded the commercial Romanian DTT services license. ZF reported that Romkatel has signed a 12-month contract worth €710,420, having beaten off a challenge from France's TDF. The tender was organised by Romania's National Society for Radiocommunications (SNR). Meanwhile, the National Audiovisual Council, in charge of the public service broadcasting sector has awarded digital licences to the public channels TVR1 and TVR2.

According to Media Express, this followed a short debate at the National Audiovisual Council (CNA) about whether to also award licences to the nine remaining public channels, one of which transmits in HD, and five are regional.

The National Authority in Communications (ANCOM) will most probably award the transmission network contract for this to the national transmission company Radiocommunicatii.

In June 2013, the Romanian Government issued a strategy to shift from analogue terrestrial to digital terrestrial. According to the Strategy, one of the five planned digital terrestrial multiplexes will be de facto granted to Radiocom, the state company involved in terrestrial carrying the public television signals, way before a selection for the muxes operators will be organized by ANCOM, selection with the deadline of 17 June 2015. The government is describing the Radiocom multiplex with the terms "pilot project" and "experiment". The minimum technical requirements for this project are: broadcast standard DVB-T2, ensuring the coverage of up to 40% of the population until 1 July 2014, and 70% of the population up to 17 June 2015, and the possibility of using the broadcasting premises that belongs to Radiocom.

On 17 June 2015, Romania shut down analog broadcasting and started broadcasting with DVB-T2 technology, but with very low coverage, and a very reduced number of broadcasts available. Because of low coverage, Romania stopped broadcasting TVR 1 in analog format on VHF on 31 December 2015. However, since the analog shut down, many people who were receiving TV on terrestrial changed to a cable or DTH provider. On 31 December 2016, Romania successfully switched to DVB-T2. After 2016, the channels received on DVB-T2 continued getting lower and lower after people switched to cable or satellite, since DVB-T was delayed a lot of times before. Kanal D left the terrestrial platform on 2 July 2015, and Antena 3 as well. Antena 1 was the only Antena Group channel to be available on terrestrial, but only until around 2010. However, people still use terrestrial TV for foreign channels. Although many TV sellers are marking their TV as being compatible with digital terrestrial television in Romania, by highlighting this feature with a sticker on the TV, buyers are mainly interested in whether the TV has DVB-C or DVB-C, however, TV sets without DVB-T2 continue to be sold with only DVB-T/C and sometimes S2, as cable and satellite compatibility presents most of the interest.

As of 2022, only TVR channels still broadcast in DVB-T, as every other channel in Romania has switched to DVB-C or DVB-S.

==== Spain ====
In Spain, most multiplexes closed after the failure of Quiero TV, the country's original pay DTT platform. DTT was relaunched on 30 November 2005, with 20 free-to-air national TV services as well as numerous regional and local services. Nearly 11 million DTT receivers had been sold as of July 2008. Positive approval for pay DTT services has reportedly been given by Spain's Ministry of Industry in a surprise move on 17 June by the Advisory Council on Telecommunications and the Information Society (Catsi). IT will now be included in a Royal Decree. Several leading Spanish media players, including Sogecable, Telefónica, Ono, Orange, and Vodafone have apparently criticised that, as according to Prisa, Sogecable's owner, "it caps a series of policy changes that benefit only a few audiovisual operators, those of terrestrial TV, to the detriment of satellite operators, cable and DSL." There may be appeals lodged against the government's decision.

==== Sweden ====
Digital terrestrial television in Sweden began in 1999 and the analog network was switched off between 2005 and 2007, completing the country's transition to a fully digital terrestrial platform.

As of late 2025, Sveriges Television anchors a mostly free core of channels alongside commercial services such as TV4. The nationwide over‑the‑air network is run by Teracom, which maintains and operates the countries broadcast infrastructure. The terrestrial pay‑TV service marketed under the Boxer brand ceased distributing pay channels over the DTT network on 2 January 2025, and many subscribers were migrated to internet‑delivered packages. Broadcasters are also increasingly pairing the DTT signal with streaming hubs and apps so linear broadcasts remains available to various audiences.

==== Switzerland ====
Switzerland introduced DTT in 2007. Switzerland later became the first country to eliminate broadcast terrestrial television entirely when public broadcaster SRG SSR, which runs the country's only terrestrial channels, shut down its DVB-T transmitter network in June 2019. SRG SSR estimated that less than two percent of households relied on its DVB-T network, the large majority of which used it only for reception on secondary devices, making continued operation not economically viable. Its programing will remain on IPTV services, cable, and free-to-air satellite. SRG SSR recommended consumers to switch to satellite. As the satellite signals are free but encrypted to restrict reception to Swiss residents, there is now one privately owned DVB-T transmitter on Hoher Kasten in Appenzell to feed the channels of SRF to cable systems in Vorarlberg, Austria.

==== North Macedonia ====
DTT was successfully launched in November 2009. It uses MPEG-2 for 4K UHD and MPEG-4 for HD. The service was launched by ONE, and the platform is called BoomTV. It offers 42 channels, including all national networks, and it is available to 95% of the population.

==== Russia ====
Digital terrestrial television in the Russian Federation was inaugurated in the summer of 2009 with a primary multiplex dedicated to public service and educational broadcasters. Over the years this initial offering was augmented by the addition of national commercial stations.

On 19 March 2012, the country completed its migration from DVB-T to DVB-T2, increasing transmission capacity and paving the way for a second multiplex, which started operation in December of that year with a broader mix of local and regional services. A third multiplex commenced service in the Moscow capital region on 15 January 2015, offering time shifted satellite feeds in addition to existing OTA channels to address urban viewing patterns.

By late 2018, the Ministry of Digital Development launched a four-phase analogue shutdown, starting regional switchovers and concluding nationwide by October 2019. The first region completed its digital transition on 3 December 2018, and transmitters were turned off on 14 October 2019. Some legacy broadcasts remained briefly for transition.

In October 2020, the second multiplex's configuration was overhauled, launching new networks to better reflect evolving demographics.

==== Turkey ====
DTT was trialed in Turkey in 2006 using DVB-T, but the public rollout did not occur; only the analogue transmission was switched off in favour of HD satellite broadcast. In 2011, preparations were made for the introduction of DTT, with channel licenses later allocated. However, in 2014, the allocations were voided by the Supreme Court, citing irregularities in awarding the licenses. The uncertainty led to reluctance of broadcasters to invest in a DTT network, particularly with satellite TV having a dominant penetration. The DTT project was revived in 2016 with the construction of a multi-purpose 100 m transmitter in Çanakkale DVB-T2 test broadcasts commenced with the opening of Çamlıca Tower. Broadcasting license only given to state owned TRT in Marmara region.

==== United Kingdom ====
The UK rollout began in November 1998 with ONdigital, a subscription service run by Granada Television and Carlton Communications that offered a small free-to-air line-up. ONdigital did not reach expected subscriber levels and was renamed ITV Digital in 2001. ITV Digital closed in 2002 and the platform was relaunched as Freeview later that year. A modest paid option, Top Up TV, launched in 2004 when Inview released the first Freeview electronic program guide. The digital transition was completed on 24 October 2012 when the analog transmitters in Northern Ireland were switched off. The retirement of analog television freed spectrum that was repurposed for other services. That spectrum now supports mobile broadband such as 4G/5G and facilitated the universal deployment of DVB-T2 for HDTV channels.

As of the mid-2020s DTT still remains an important, widely viewed platform countrywide. Policy work focuses on improving capacity for HD and enabling increased Ultra HD broadcasts. Parliament have commissioned reviews and held numerous debates about the long term role of terrestrial broadcasting. Stemming from said hearings, Ofcom has proposed trimming national multiplexes rather than abandoning DTT, and broadcasters are increasingly pairing OTA signals with internet delivered over the top programming to keep free to air broadcasts accessible across modern smart devices.

=== North America ===
The Bahamas and Bermuda broadcast using ATSC standards in line with their continental neighbors.

==== Canada ====
Canada employs the ATSC standards for DTV broadcasting. Over-the-air service is generally available in most population centers. Yet coverage remains limited to nonexistent in many rural and northern regions. Hundreds of former analog translators operated by the CBC were shut down after the primary transition in 2011, and many were not replaced with digital equivalents. A small number of analog stations still remain operational in remote markets, despite federal plans to phase out all NTSC broadcasts by 2022.

As of late 2025, Canada has not adopted ATSC 3 (NextGen TV). Experimental deployments exist, however, including a research lab at Humber Polytechnic in Toronto. There is no national rollout or regulatory mandate in place. Although over-the-air signals remain available in most populated areas, their viewership has declined in favor of multichannel video programming distributors (MVPDs) and streaming platforms. The majority of Canadian households subscribe to those services, and broadcasters are heavily prioritizing smart TV and mobile applications.

==== Mexico ====
In Mexico, the digital transition is completed. Digital signals are available in all cities, thus providing national coverage. Analog transmissions were turned off based on population size. Tijuana was the first city to turn off analog signals, and the nationwide turn-off was completed on 31 December 2015. On 27 October 2016, Mexico relocated all of its channels. This made Azteca 13 (now Azteca Uno) on virtual channel 1.1 nationwide, Canal de Las Estrellas (now Las Estrellas) on virtual channel 2.1, and Imagen Television on virtual channel 3.1. Border cities were not affected due to signal issues across the United States. For example, in the Tijuana-San Diego area, channel 2.1's signal comes from KCBS-TV, a CBS owned-and-operated station in Los Angeles, and can affect television users in portions of San Diego County. Thus, Las Estrellas is on virtual channel 19.1.

==== United States ====
In the United States, on 12 June 2009, all full-power U.S. television broadcasts became exclusively digital under the Digital Television and Public Safety Act of 2005. Since 1 March 2007, new television sets that receive signals over the air, including portable televisions, must include ATSC digital tuners. From early 2008 until spring 2009, consumers could request two free coupons from the FCC to help offset the cost of set‐top DTV converters. Prior to 12 June 2009, most U.S. broadcasters were transmitting in both analog and digital formats; a few were digital only. Most U.S. stations were not permitted to shut down their analog transmissions prior to 16 February 2009 unless doing so was required in order to complete work on a station's permanent digital facilities. Some television stations were also authorized to operate "nightlight" analog signals, which consisted solely of brief, repeated announcements advising viewers still using analog reception on how to transition to digital. A limited number of stations additionally aired short news and weather updates alongside the aforementioned PSAs, under a program known as "enhanced nightlight" service. Both services ended by the June 2009 deadline. By the end of 2009, the Federal Communications Commission (FCC) finished auctioning channels 52–59 for other communications services, completing the reallocation of broadcast channels 52–69 that began in 1996.⁣

Low-power and Class A stations were not included in the 2009 changeover due to technical and financial challenges and were eventually required to transition or sign off by 13 July 2021, with extensions granted for some areas outside the contiguous US.

Following the completion of the digital television transition, the Federal Communications Commission initiated the 2016 United States wireless spectrum auction or "repack" to reallocate channels 38–51 for new cellular broadband services. This process concluded around 2020, involving reallocating broadcast spectrum and requiring many television stations to modify their transmission facilities.

Simultaneously, the FCC authorized the voluntary adoption of ATSC 3.0, also known as NextGen TV, a new broadcast standard offering enhanced features such as 4K/ HDR, improved urban reception, and advanced emergency alerting capabilities. Because ATSC 3 is not backward compatible with legacy ATSC 1 equipment, the FCC's rules require broadcasters that begin NextGen transmissions to maintain a simulcast of their primary programming in ATSC 1 on either their own facility or via a channel sharing arrangement with other stations in a DMA (known as a "lighthouse") for the duration of the transition period.

As of fall 2025, the National Association of Broadcasters has filed a petition with the FCC proposing a two-phase mandatory ATSC 3 transition, by February 2028 for the top 55 Nielsen markets and by February 2030 for all others. The proposal has drawn widespread criticism over NextGenTV's inclusion of DRM features that critics argue could severely limit device compatibility and adoption.

=== Central America and the Caribbean ===
==== Costa Rica ====
Costa Rica chose Japanese-Brazilian standard ISDB-T as 7th country on 25 May 2010, and started trial transmissions by Channel 13 from Irazú Volcano on 19 March 2012.

==== Cuba ====
Cuba announced on 19 March 2013 that it is "prepared" to perform a digital television test using the Chinese DTMB system.

==== Dominican Republic ====
The Dominican Republic chose ATSC standards for DTT on 10 August 2010.

==== El Salvador ====
El Salvador has chosen the Japanese-Brazilian standard ISDB-Tb in 2017. The Digital Switchover began on 21 December 2018, and by 1 December 2024, it will be completed.

==== Guatemala ====
Guatemala has chosen the Japanese-Brazilian standard ISDB-Tb.

==== Honduras ====
Honduras has chosen the Japanese-Brazilian standard ISDB-Tb.

==== Jamaica ====
Jamaica chose ATSC standards for DTT in December 2021.

==== Nicaragua ====
Nicaragua has chosen the Japanese-Brazilian standard ISDB-Tb.

==== Panama ====
Panama chose the European DVB-T standard on 12 May 2009.

==== Trinidad and Tobago ====
Trinidad and Tobago chose ATSC standards for DTT on 18 January 2023.

=== South America ===
==== Argentina ====
Argentine President Cristina Fernández signed on 28 August 2009 an agreement to adopt the ISDB-Tb system, joining Brazil, which has already implemented the standard in its big cities. On air service started from 28 April 2010.

==== Bolivia ====
On 5 July 2010, the Bolivian chancellor signed an agreement with the Japanese ambassador to Bolivia, choosing the Japanese system with the Brazilian modifications ISDB-T (Integrated Services Digital Broadcasting Terrestrial).

==== Brazil ====
Brazil's transition to digital television started in June 2006 when regulators selected ISDB-Tb (also known as SBTVD), a modified form of Japan's ISDB-T system. Services launched in São Paulo on 2 December 2007 and within two years had extended to major cities across all five regions. By mid-September 2009, viewers in more than forty metro areas could receive digital broadcasts. The DTV signals reached full national coverage by 2013. The country completed its analogue shutdown in November 2023. In August 2025, regulators approved a standard based on the American ATSC 3.0, branded as DTV+, which began test broadcasts in Rio de Janeiro and São Paulo, with full deployment starting by mid-2026.

==== Chile ====
On 14 September 2009, President Michelle Bachelet announced that the government had finally decided on a digital television standard. Chile adopted the ISDB-T Japanese standard (with the custom modifications made by Brazil). Simulcasting began in 2010, with a projected analog switch-off in 2017.

==== Colombia ====
Colombia chose the European DVB-T standard on 28 August 2008. However, in 2012, Colombia adopted DVB-T2 as the national standard for terrestrial television, replacing DVB-T, the previously selected standard for digital TV.

On 28 December 2010, private networks Caracol TV and RCN TV officially started digital broadcasts for Bogotá, Medellín and surrounding areas on channels 14 and 15 UHF, respectively. State-run Señal Colombia and Canal Institucional had started testing digital broadcasts earlier in 2010.

The current coverage of DVB-T2 can be consulted on the website of the organization "Tdt para Todos" which is the entity responsible for facilitating its adoption.

==== Ecuador ====
Ecuador chose Japanese-Brazilian standard ISDB-T as 6th country on 26 March 2010.

==== Paraguay ====
Paraguay chose Japanese-Brazilian standard ISDB-T on 1 June 2010.

==== Guyana ====
As of August 2025, the Guyana Learning Channel is broadcasting a multiplex in the ATSC standard. On 19 March 2025, it launched a campaign for the delivery of digital receivers to households that only receive analog signals. In early 2025, the National Communications Network began digital terrestrial broadcasts of its channels, NCN HD and NCN Sports in 1080p using the ATSC standard. CTV19 also officially launched its digital feed on 4 August 2025.

==== Peru ====
On 23 April 2009, Peru chose the Brazilian variant of the Japanese digital television standard ISDB-T. The Peruvian government signed an agreement with its Japanese counterpart in order for the latter to fund the implementation of the DTT platform in the country. The first network to be launched on digital terrestrial television was TV Perú on 30 March 2010, using the ISDB-Tb standard. Currently, all the major stations in Lima are broadcasting on DTT in high-definition. ATV was the first television channel in the country to do digital test broadcasts on 19 June 2007 using either ATSC, DVB-T, and ISDB-T in order to see which of them was better. Eventually, ATV chose ISDB-Tb and officially started broadcasting in HD; its first live TV show to be aired in high definition was Magaly TV on 30 August 2010. Frecuencia Latina also began broadcasting on DTT on 14 September 2010 with a match of the Peru women's national volleyball team in the 2010 FIVB Women's Volleyball World Championship. Shortly after these events, América Televisión started broadcasting on DTT.

==== Suriname ====
Suriname is currently transitioning from analogue NTSC broadcasts to digital ATSC and DVB-T broadcasts. Channel ATV started with ATSC broadcasts in the Paramaribo area in June 2014, which was followed by ATSC broadcasts from stations in Brokopondo, Wageningen, and Albina. The stations in Brokopondo, Wageningen, and Albina broadcast both the channels of ATV (i.e., ATV and TV2) and STVS, while the station in Paramaribo currently only broadcasts the ATV channels. The Telecommunication Authority of Suriname was originally aiming at a full digital transition by June 2015, but this was criticized by broadcasters as being unfeasible. However, the ITU has documented both DVB-T and ATSC are in use.

==== Uruguay ====
Uruguay chose the European DVB-T standard in August 2007, however disproved it and decided to adopt ISDB-T on 27 December 2010 to follow neighbouring countries.

==== Venezuela ====
In Venezuela, tests are being performed with full deployment to start 2008–2009. DTT will coexist with analogue standard television for some time until full deployment of the system on a nationwide level is accomplished. 30 September 2009, decided to employ the Japanese ISDB-T system under cooperation with Japan, and officially agreed with Japan in early October 2009.

On 6 October 2009, Venezuela officially adopted ISDB-T with Brazilian modifications. Transition from analog to digital is expected to take place in the next 10 years.

In March 2012, Venezuela signed a $50M agreement to purchase 300,000 decoders from Argentina to implement TDT in Caracas and later this year in some of the most important cities, but only in the Government-controlled TV Stations. NTSC and TDT will coexist. The Government hopes to reach TDT the whole country's population in 2 years.

As of 2019, due to the Venezuelan crisis, the digital television transition is paralysed and DTT development has been frozen.

=== Africa ===
The majority of countries in Africa have adopted the DVB-T2 standard, including Algeria, Democratic Republic of the Congo, Ethiopia, Ghana, Kenya, Lesotho, Madagascar, Malawi, Mali, Mauritius, Mozambique, Namibia, Seychelles, Swaziland, Tanzania, Togo, Uganda, Zambia, and Zimbabwe. Angola, Botswana, and some other countries broadcast using the Japanese-Brazilian standard ISDB-Tb.

==== Nigeria ====
In March 2015, Inview Technology (a UK DTV consultancy based in Cheshire with local operations in Nigeria) was appointed by the NBC, Nigeria's government‐run broadcast regulator, to manage the country's transition from analogue to digital transmission. Under this agreement, Inview supplied a conditional access system, electronic programme guide (EPG), video on-demand, and broadcasting applications and audience measurement via terrestrial and satellite networks. Only manufacturers licensed in Nigeria could obtain the Inview software, a measure intended to protect consumers and domestic producers from unauthorized imports

Later in 2015, Inview Nigeria and the NBC launched FreeTV, a free-to-air service modelled on Freeview UK. FreeTV carried up to 30 channels of Nigerian and international stations across various genres and general entertainment. To promote uptake, the required set-top box was subsidised to a retail price of ₦1,500 (approximately US$7.50) and a ₦1,000 (approximately US$5) annual digital access fee was imposed on all digital receivers, including those used by pay-TV providers. Revenue from spectrum sales, estimated at US$1 billion, was earmarked to cover infrastructure costs and ensure that the digital switchover programme remained self-financing.

As of October 2025, NBC reports that digital terrestrial coverage for FreeTV extends to 75 percent of Nigeria's population across 18 states, with full nationwide analogue switch-off scheduled for December 2026.

==== South Africa ====
On 14 January 2011, the South African Department of Communications and Digital Technologies chose the European standard DVB-T2 as the digital television standard in South Africa, following the trend in this direction of several African nations.

On 5 September 2011, MultiChoice partnered with M-Net and the Community Service Network (CSN) to launch GOtv South Africa as a terrestrial pay TV service for analogue subscribers.

Platco Digital's OpenView HD and the eMedia Investments group introduced a free-to-air satellite decoder set-top box, sold for a one-off purchase fee, carrying e.tv and SABC via direct-to-home satellite. The terrestrial network later completed its digital migration on 1 October 2015. Eligible households may obtain a free, government subsidised set-top box at their local post office branch to receive digital terrestrial television services.

Under the two-step plan all analogue broadcasting above 694 MHz was switched off on 31 July 2023 and the period of simultaneous analogue and digital transmissions for services below that frequency ended on 31 December 2024. Smaller provinces made the transition first, while Gauteng, the Western Cape, KwaZulu-Natal and the Eastern Cape (together home to more than half of South Africa's population) remained on analogue until the final shutdown in late March 2025, delaying the switch to digital only transmission in the country's most populous regions.

==== Tunisia ====
Tunisia's Office of National Broadcasting (ONT) began digitizing its terrestrial TV network in two main phases.

The first phase, launched in 2001 at Boukornine, tested DVB-T transmissions with MPEG-2 compression to cover Greater Tunis. Trials confirmed sharper video and better spectrum use (four to six channels per multiplex instead of one analogue channel). During this period ONT drew up a national frequency plan and ratified the 2006 ITU Geneva conference recommendations, which set a 2015 analogue transition target.

The second phase comprised two projects. The first upgraded studio-to-transmitter links across 41 sites and completed in 2009. The second delivered 17 DVB-T transmitters nationwide under a Thomson Grass Valley contract in 2009–2010. Since completing its analogue switch-off in June 2015, Tunisia has operated a fully digitised terrestrial television network covering over 90% of households.

== See also ==
- Digital television transition
- Television Multiplex
- Digital Television
