= CNS =

CNS may refer to:

== Science and medicine ==
- Central nervous system
- Clinical nurse specialist
- Coagulase-negative staphylococcus
- Connectedness to nature scale
- Conserved non-coding sequence of DNA
- Crigler–Najjar syndrome
- Crystallography and NMR system, a software library
- Color Naming System

== Military ==
- CNS (chemical weapon), a mixture of chloroacetophenone, chloropicrin and chloroform
- Chief of the Naval Staff (disambiguation), in several countries
- Former Taiwanese navy ship prefix

== Education ==
- Cicero-North Syracuse High School, New York, US
- City of Norwich School, England
- Computation and Neural Systems, a Caltech program

== Organisations ==
- Canadian Nuclear Society
- Chinese Nuclear Society
- Communications Nova Scotia, defunct government agency in Canada
- Congress of Neurological Surgeons
- Corporation for National Service, later the Corporation for National and Community Service, commonly known as AmeriCorps
- Council for National Security, military junta of Thailand in 2006
- Cuban National Series, baseball league
- Szekler National Council (Consiliul Național Secuiesc), Romania

== Media ==
- Cartoon Network Studios
- Catholic News Service
- China News Service
- City News Service
- CNS TV 6, a Guyanese television channel
- CNSNews, formerly Cybercast News Service
- Copley News Service
- Cox News Service

== Other ==
- Cairns International Airport, IATA code
- Chateau Neuf Spelemannslag, Norwegian folk music group
- Chinese National Standards
- Cooper Nuclear Station, a nuclear power plant in United States
- Communication, navigation and surveillance, in air traffic management
- Custody Notification Service, Australian advice service
- "Cell, Nature, or Science": a "CNS Paper" means a scientific publication in one of these high-profile scientific journals
