= List of mobile network operators of the Caribbean =

This is a list of cell phone providers in the Caribbean region. (As per their websites.)

Operator	Technology	Countries
Aliv	UMTS, HSPA, HSPA+, DC-HSPA+, LTE, LTE-A	Bahamas
Altice Dominicana S.A.	GSM, UMTS, LTE	Dominican Republic
bmobile (TSTT)	GSM, GPRS, EDGE, UMTS, HSPA, HSPA+, DC-HSPA+, LTE, LTE-A, 5G NR	Trinidad and Tobago
BTC	GSM, GPRS, EDGE, UMTS, HSPA, HSPA+, DC-HSPA+, LTE, LTE-A	Bahamas
Viya	WiMAX, LTE	United States Virgin Islands
CELLONE	CDMA, GSM, UMTS, LTE	Bermuda
Claro	GSM, UMTS, LTE, 5G NR	Dominican Republic, Puerto Rico
Natcom	GSM, UMTS, HSDPA, LTE	Haiti
Digicel	GSM, GPRS, EDGE, UMTS, HSPA, HSPA+, DC-HSPA+, LTE, LTE-A	Anguilla, Antigua and Barbuda, Aruba, Barbados, Bermuda, Bonaire, British Virgin Islands, Cayman Islands, Curaçao, Dominica, Grenada, French Guiana, Guadeloupe, Guyana, Haiti, Jamaica, Martinique, Saint Barthelemy, Saint Martin, Saint Kitts and Nevis, Saint Lucia, Sint Maarten, Saint Vincent and the Grenadines, Suriname, Trinidad and Tobago, Turks and Caicos Islands
ETECSA	GSM, UMTS, LTE	Cuba
GT&T	GSM, UMTS, LTE	Guyana
Haitel	CDMA	Haiti
FLOW	GSM, GPRS, EDGE, UMTS, HSPA, HSPA+, DC-HSPA+, LTE LTE-A	Anguilla, Antigua and Barbuda, The Bahamas, Barbados, British Virgin Islands, Cayman Islands, Dominica, Grenada, Jamaica, Montserrat, Saint Kitts and Nevis, Saint Lucia, Saint Vincent and the Grenadines, Turks and Caicos Islands, Trinidad and Tobago (planned)
Liberty	LTE, LTE-A, 5G NR	Puerto Rico, United States Virgin Islands
Orange	GSM, UMTS, LTE	French Guiana, Guadeloupe, Martinique, Saint Barthélemy, Saint Martin
Setar	CDMA, GSM, EDGE, UMTS, HSPA+, DC-HSPA, LTE	Aruba
Telesur	CDMA, GSM, EDGE, UMTS, HSPA+, DC-HSPA, LTE	Suriname
T-Mobile US •Includes Sprint	GSM, GPRS, EDGE, LTE, LTE-A, 5G NR	Puerto Rico, United States Virgin Islands
Altice	CDMA, LTE	Dominican Republic
TelCell	GSM	Sint Maarten, Saba, Sint Eustatius
CHIPPIE	GSM, UMTS, LTE	Curacao, Sint Maarten, Bonaire, Saba, Sint Eustatius, French Guiana, Guadeloupe, Martinique, Saint Kitts and Nevis, Saint Barthélemy, Saint Martin
Dauphin Telecom	GSM	Saint Barthélemy, Saint Martin, Guadeloupe
Viva	GSM, LTE	Dominican Republic

== See also ==
- List of telephone_operating_companies
- List of mobile network operators of the Americas
- List of telecommunications regulatory bodies
