= Telecommunications in Guyana =

Telecommunications in Guyana include radio, television, fixed and mobile telephones, and the Internet. Early telecommunications were owned by large foreign firms until the industry was nationalized in the 1970s. Government stifled criticism with a tight control of the media, and the infrastructure lagged behind other countries, Guyana Telephone and Telegraph Company (GT&T) holding a monopoly on most such services. In a 2012 census report on Guyanese households, 55.5% had a radio, 82.7% had a television, 27.8% had a personal computer, and 16.2% had internet at home, 49.3% had a telephone landline, and 70.6% had a cellular phone.

In the 1990s, a shift towards privatization was geared towards improving the overall quality of services in the country. The 2016 Telecommunications Act was made to improve quality and lower prices for consumers as well as establish universal access.

== Infrastructure ==
Guyana has various communications cables for international connections. The Suriname-Guyana Submarine Cable System (SGSCS) linking Trinidad, Guyana, and Suriname and the Americas II fiber optic submarine communications cable linking the United States, Puerto Rico, the U.S. Virgin Islands, Martinique, Curaçao, Trinidad, Venezuela, French Guiana, and Brazil with terrestrial extensions to Suriname and Guyana. The X-Link Submarine Cable was installed in 2019 and owned by E-Networks Inc., links Guyana to Barbados. An overland Brazil to Guyana Fibre Optic Cable that was built in 2011 has been abandoned due to extensive damage.

== Radio ==
Radio history in Guyana started in the early 20th century, owing its early development to the country's interest in cricket. It was largely established by foreign media companies until a wave of nationalization mid-century. Currently there are stations aired that are privately owned, but the country has received much criticism for having tight government controls.

== Television ==
- Broadcast stations: government-dominated; the National Communications Network (NCN) TV is state-owned; a few private TV stations relay satellite services (2007).
- Censorship: No government-imposed restrictions on television stations or suspensions of broadcasts in 2012. The government largely directs advertising to media houses aligned with the governing party. The government continues to exert heavy control over the content of the National Communications Network (TV), giving government spokespersons extended coverage, while limiting participation of opposition figures.

The first television station in Guyana was established in 1988, using a transmitter obtained from Canada. Many households already could watch TV programs from the US, through "pirate re-transmitting stations" and the use of receiving dishes. Guyana was the first English-speaking Caribbean country to install a USIA TVRO, which sent broadcast signals from Washington D.C. In the 70s and 80s, information dissemination continued to favor the North due to infrastructures established in the colonial period. The MacBride report in 1980 was an attempt to discuss the imbalance between advantaged countries such as the US and the UK, and developing states like Guyana, that don't have the capacity for controlling information flow between their borders.

Broadcasting is regulated by the Guyana National Broadcasting Authority (GNBA), a body established by the Broadcasting Act of 2011. The Broadcast (Amendment) Bill 2017 was made to guarantee a certain amount of broadcast hours to government public service announcements, however this was seen as a threat to free speech, since such PSAs were typically serving the political party in power, rather than the public.

=== Broadcasting Companies ===
==== Television ====
- GWTV (formerly Safe TV)
- Ignite Television
- WRHM
- Guyana TV 9
- Guyana Learning Channel Trust
- NCN Television (NCN Guyana)
- Rambarran Broadcasting Systems (RBS)
- Multi Technology Vision (MTV)
- HGPTV
- National Television Network
- Hits and Jams Television (HJTV)
- First Light Television
- Television Guyana
- Good News TV
- 21st Century TV/MBC
- Skar Communications/ENet
- Dave's Televisison Station (DTV8)
- KTV
- Little Rock Television (LRTVS)
- Countryside Broadcasting Inc. (CTV19)
- Tarzie's Transmission Service (TTS)
- Pinnacle Communications (RCA TV 8)
- Premium Communication Services (PCN15)

==== Cable ====
- Premium Communications Inc.
- E-Networks Inc.
- Infinity Telecommunications Inc.
- Go-Tech Inc.
- Movie Star Inc.
- Northwest Television Inc.

== Telephone ==
Guyana has reliable international long-distance service. 100% digital network; national transmission supported by fiber optic cable and rural network by microwaves; more than 150,000 lines; many areas still lack fixed-line telephone services; 2019 budget allocates funds for information and communications technology development; broadband subscribers remains small and end-users incur expense to use.

In 2016, Parliament ended the telephone monopoly of Guyana Telephone and Telegraph.

- Calling code: +592
- International call prefix: 001
- Main lines: Over 150,000 lines in use, 131st in the world; fixed-line teledensity is about 18 per 100 persons (2019).
- Mobile cellular: 617,998 subscriptions, 169th in the world; mobile-cellular teledensity is about 83 per 100 persons (2019).
- International:
  - Tropospheric scatter to Trinidad (2011).
  - Satellite earth station: One Intelsat (Atlantic Ocean) (2019).

== Internet ==
- Top-level domain: .gy
- Internet users: 276,498 168th in the world; 37.33% of the population (2018)
- Fixed broadband: 64,889 subscribers, 129th in the world (2017)
- Wireless broadband: unknown (2012).
- Internet hosts: 24,936, 112th in the world (2012).
- IPv4: 38,912 allocated addresses, less than 0.05% of world total; 52.5 per 1000 people (2012).

The three major ISPs in Guyana were GTT, Digicel and E-Networks. In 2021, the government made licensing exemptions for small ISPs, to encourage private-sector telecommunications development.

With regard to internet censorship and surveillance, there are no government restrictions on access to the Internet or credible reports that the government monitors e-mail or Internet chat rooms without judicial oversight.

== See also ==
- LACNIC (Latin America and Caribbean Network Information Centre) allocates IPv4 and IPv6 numbers for the region.
