= Crack Attack =

Crack Attack may refer to:

== Music ==
- Crack Attack, a 1987 12" EP by Big Stick
- Crack Attack, a 1989 song by Grace Jones from the album Bulletproof Heart
- Crack Attack, a 1998 song by Rocket from the Crypt from the Break It Up EP
- The Crack Attack, a 1998 song by Fat Joe from the album Don Cartagena
- Say No Brother (Crack Attack Don't Do It), a 1980s anti-drug single by Boogie Down Productions on B-Boy Records

== Video games ==
- Crack Attack!, a free and open-source puzzle video game
- Crack Attack, a 2015 game by Kuju Entertainment
