= Vishok Persaud =

Guyanese telecommunications executive and racing driver

- Occupation: Business executive
- Known for: Founder and CEO of ENet (formerly E-Networks); Group 4 circuit racing in Guyana
- Relatives: Vindhya Persaud (sister); Reepu Daman Persaud (father)

Vishok Persaud is a Guyanese entrepreneur and racing driver. He is the founder and chief executive of ENet (formerly E-Networks), a telecom operator in Guyana. Under his tenure the company launched a 4G/5G VoLTE network in 2022-2023 and expanded national fibre connectivity. As a participant in national circuit racing, he set lap records at the South Dakota Circuit and the 2024 Group 4 (2WD) title.

== Early life and family ==
Persaud is the son of Reepu Daman Persaud, a long-serving politician and Hindu priest, and the brother of physician and minister Vindhya Persaud.

He attended Queen’s College in Georgetown. In 2023, he and his siblings funded a media room for the school’s student journalism program.

== Business career ==
Persaud founded E-Networks (rebranded as ENet) in 2003 and serves as the company’s CEO. The firm expanded fixed broadband and pay-TV services and developed international connectivity via submarine fibre links from Georgetown to Barbados, with domestic extensions along the Essequibo Coast and to Bartica. Following the liberalization of Guyana’s telecoms market in October 2020, ENet obtained a public telecommunications licence and launched a 4G/5G VoLTE mobile network in 2022-2023.

== Motorsport ==
Persaud competes in Group 4 (two-wheel drive) circuit racing with a KTM X-Bow at the GMR&SC’s South Dakota Circuit. He broke the Group 4 lap record at the ENet Caribbean Clash of Champions in November 2023 with a 1:16.691 lap, set an endurance-meet lap record of 1:22.42 in January 2024 while winning the South Dakota 100 endurance race, and secured the 2024 Group 4 (2WD) drivers’ championship at the season finale.

== See also ==
- ENet
- Telecommunications in Guyana
