= SKAR TV =

Guyanese television channel

- Country: Guyana
- Broadcast area: National
- Headquarters: Georgetown

Programming
- Language: English
- Picture format: 480i (NTSC)

Ownership
- Sister channels: E1, E2, E3, Tarzee TV

History
- Launched: 1996
- Former names: Vision TV, Flix TV

Links
- Website: https://www.instagram.com/skartvguyana/

Availability

Terrestrial
- UHF: Channel 46

SKAR TV is a Guyanese television channel, established in 1996. The station broadcasts on UHF channel 46.

== History ==
SKAR TV received a warning for its airing of the film Taken in September 2010 due to it containing "indecent" language. In December 2013, the station was eligible for two licenses.

The station carried the 2021 GMRSC Drag Race alongside ENetworks' E1 and Bartica's Tarzee TV. An interview with Bharrat Jagdeo aired on 8 August 2021. In November of that year, it carried a virtual Diwali motorcade alongside NCN and NTN.
