= Viya (company) =

Telecommunications company in the United States Virgin Islands

- Company type: Subsidiary
- Predecessor: VITELCO; Innovative Communications Corporation; Choice Communications
- Founded: 2017
- Headquarters: St. Thomas, United States Virgin Islands
- Number of locations: 3
- Area served: The United States Virgin Islands
- Key people: Siobhan James-Alexander (CEO)
- Services: Broadband; Telephone; Television; Mobile telephony
- Parent: ATN International
- Website: Viya

Viya is an American telecommunications company that provides landline, mobile telephone, Internet, and cable television services in the United States Virgin Islands. Viya is a subsidiary of ATN International. Prior to its acquisition by ATN, it was formerly known as VITELCO, then later on as Innovative Communications Corporation. In 2015, Choice Communications, a subsidiary of ATN, purchased Innovative for $145 Million, and it completed the sale on July 1, 2016. In 2017, ATN merged both Innovative and Choice to form Viya.

Viya owned the Virgin Islands Daily News until 2008, when it was purchased by Times-Shamrock Communications. Viya formerly operated cable TV services in Sint Maarten until October 2016, when it was acquired by the TelEm Group. They also had formerly operated cable TV services in the British Virgin Islands as well, until their cable systems were destroyed by Hurricane Irma on September 6, 2017.

On April 24, 2025, Viya’s current CEO Siobhan James-Alexander, announced that the company rebranded as One Communications, at a launch event that took place in St. Thomas.

Logo of Innovative Communications
