= Radio in Guyana =

The radio programming in Guyana caters to a diverse ethnic demographic.

== History ==
Radio began in 1920s British Guiana with rudimentary wired service using telephone lines to transmit BBC broadcasts. Shortwave was used until 1931, then made a comeback in 1935 when there was a demand for cricket commentary. From this came two stations, VP3BG and VPSMR which were run separately until 1938 when they were merged into station ZFY under the British Guiana United Broadcasting Co Ltd. In 1949, ZFY secured a medium wave transmitter. In 1950 the first foreign capital entered the radio market when ZFY was purchased by Overseas Rediffusion Ltd. ZFY was renamed Radio Demerara in 1951, and in 1955 moved into the first professional studio on high street. and in 1957 a new transmitting and receiving station was erected at Sparendaam on the East Coast Demerara. A second station was established in 1958, the British Guiana Broadcasting Service (BGBS).

In 1968, the government took over BGBS, and it became the Guyana Broadcasting Service (GBS). Soon after, Guyana gained independence from Britain, and the policy shifted toward one of nationalization. In 1979, assets in Radio Demerara were sold by Broadcasting Relay (Overseas) Limited to the government.

GBS rebranded in 1980, by then with Channel 1, on the frequencies of former Radio Demerara at 760 kHz and Channel 2, formerly GBS at 560 kHz. Channel One became Radio Roraima and Channel 2 was renamed Voice of Guyana. FM service 98.1 went on the air in 1998. In 2004, GBC and the Guyana Television Broadcasting Company Limited (GTV) merged to form a new company, National Communication Network Incorporated (NCN). The airwaves were then government-dominated, owning and operates two radio stations broadcasting on multiple frequencies capable of reaching the entire country; government limits on licensing of new private radio stations constrained competition as of 2007. Licenses and competition: In 2009 the Court of Appeal ruled that the government had an unlawful monopoly on the airwaves and was not adequately considering radio license applications. In 2011 the government approved applications for ten new radio stations, although the process was controversial and lacked transparency.

The first privately owned radio station obtained license in 2012, and it was closely aligned with the government. Vieira Communications Limited (VCT) charged the National Frequency Management Unit with procrastinating on radio license applications since their own application languished since 1993. In 2013, NTN was the second such privately owned radio station to obtain a license.

=== Legislation ===
Press freedom: The government controls most radio stations, which limits the dissemination of diverse views and open public discussion. The NGO Reporters Without Borders criticized press freedom in the country in 2012, due largely to its radio broadcasting monopolies.

The 2011 Broadcasting Act granted wide and sweeping powers to GNBA for the issuing, suspension and revocation of licenses, and for demanding uncapped amounts of time for Public Service Broadcasts. In order to clarify the amount of public service content required by stations, the Broadcast Bill 2017 established that all broadcasters carry one hour of public service programs daily. Breaking this law subjects station owners to a one-year prison term, a fine of $1 million and the forfeiture of all their equipment. International press freedom bodies, such as Reporters without Borders and the International Press Institute, voiced concerns over the provisions of the bill.

== Stations ==
These stations cover both the AM and FM broadcast bands. Where possible, nicknames of stations have been given alongside the frequencies.

== AM stations ==
Callsign	Frequency	URL	Stream	City/Town	Network affiliation/Owner	Format
Voice of Guyana	560	Online		Guyana		
Voice of Guyana	700	Online		Guyana		

== FM stations ==
Callsign	Frequency	URL	Stream	City/Town	Network affiliation/Owner	Format
Little Rock Radio - 88.5 Rock FM	88.5	Online		Guyana		Rock
NTN Radio	89.1	Online		Guyana		
Radio Guyana	89.3/89.5/89.7	Online		Guyana	Queens Atlantic Investment Inc.	R&B, Soca, Bollywood Hits, Chutney, Hip-Hop and Reggae
Mix 90.1FM	90.1/91.5/103.3	Online	Audio	Georgetown Linden	TBC Radio Network	Pop, Rock, R&B & Variety
Real FM	93.1	Online		Guyana		Top 40/Pop
Hits and Jams 94.1 BOOM FM	94.1	Online		Guyana		Variety
Radio Essequibo	95.5			Anna Regina	NCN	Regional broadcasting (Adventure, Akawini Mission, Bethany, Machabo, Kabakaburi)
Radio Paiwomak	97.1			Annai, Guyana	NCN/North Rupununi District Development Board	Guyana's first indigenous community radio, in Macushi language.
98.1 Hot FM	98.1	Online		Guyana		Soca, Chutney, Reggae, Pop & News
Vybz 100.1 FM	100.1	Online		Guyana	NCN	Variety
Mega 102.1	102.1	Online		Georgetown		International
Voice of Guyana	102.5	Online		Guyana	NCN	
104.3 Power FM	104.3	Online		Guyana		
Voice of Guyana	106.5	Online		Guyana		

== Defunct ==
- iRadio 90.1 Love FM

== Other Links ==
- BBC Guyana Profile
