= Crack Attack! =

2001 video game

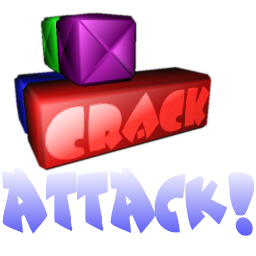

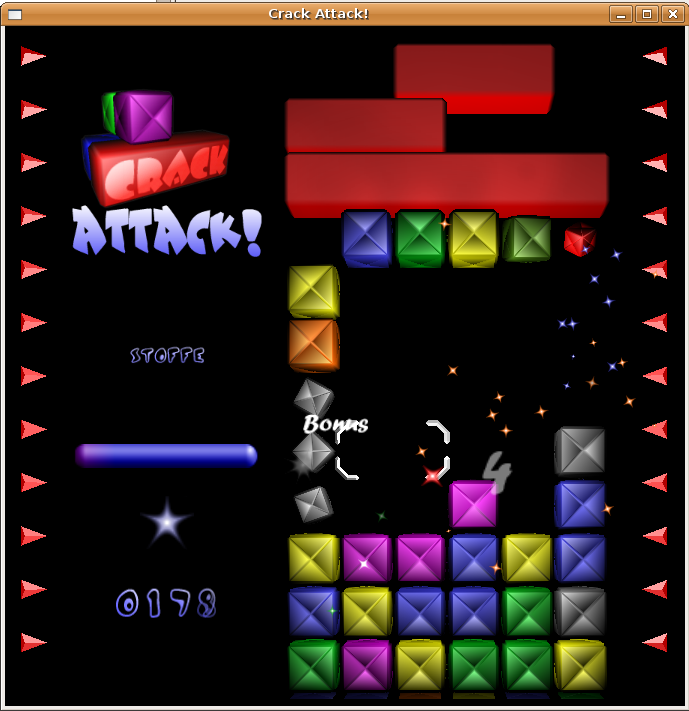
- In-game screenshot
- Original author: Daniel Nelson
- Developer: Andrew Sayman
- Release: 2001; 25 years ago
- Stable release: 1.1.14 / May 14, 2005; 21 years ago
- Written in: C++
- Operating system: Linux, Windows, Mac OS X
- Type: Puzzle game
- License: GNU GPL-2.0
- Website: www.nongnu.org/crack-attack/

Crack Attack! is a free and open-source puzzle video game developed by Daniel Nelson and later maintained by Andrew Sayman. Inspired by Nintendo's Tetris Attack, it was released in 2001 for Linux before being ported to Windows and Mac OS X. Its gameplay is based on swapping blocks in a rising stack to form matching rows or columns.

== Gameplay ==
The gameplay is similar to that of Tetris Attack. Gameplay consists of swapping adjacent blocks to form horizontal or vertical matches of three or more blocks before the rising stack reaches the top of the screen. Successful matches can trigger combos and chains, generating "garbage" blocks that are sent to the opponent in versus play. The game includes a single-player score mode, a versus mode against another player or the computer, and an "X-treme" mode introducing additional block and garbage types.

== Development ==
Crack Attack! was created by Daniel Nelson in the early 2000s, and was included in the Debian archives by December 2001. Andrew Sayman took over the project with version 1.1.10 and released the last stable version, 1.1.14, on 14 May 2005; it added sound composed by Miguel Ángel Vilela, a low-detail graphics mode and a computer-controlled opponent.

In June 2006, Sayman released an alpha version, 1.1.15, to test a rewrite of the game's networking layer using the ENet library. The new implementation was incompatible with earlier versions, and no subsequent stable release was published.

Third-party developers continued to port the game to other platforms. The Mac OS X version was ported by Jeff Disher, while a separate port called Mac Crack Attack!, by Daniel Aarno, added sound and a full-screen mode that Disher's port lacked. Aarno's port was noted by Macworld Australia in 2006 and was maintained long after the original. A 2021 release supports both x86 and Apple silicon Macs. A homebrew port for the Wii, by Alberto Mardegan, was published on the Open Shop Channel in 2024.

== Reception ==
Crack Attack! was reviewed and featured in computing publications over more than a decade. The Australian magazine Atomic reviewed it in 2006, calling it "so criminally addictive that you won't care", and returned to it in a 2008 open-source games feature, remarking that "if I can mention only one classic puzzle game, it has to be Crack-Attack". The download site Acid Play rated it 8.5 out of 10, praising its fast-paced and polished gameplay and distinguishing it from hastily produced clones. The Italian magazine PC Professionale concluded in 2010 that "the fun is guaranteed".

The game was given a dedicated section in the Linux Starter Pack special from Linux Format (2008), which judged two-player games "about as much fun as you can have with your Linux box", while the German magazine c't (2008) highlighted its "durch coolen Sound und schicke 3D-Grafik" (cool sound and slick 3D graphics). It is also described in the books Test Driving Linux (O'Reilly, 2005), which called it "a bit like a Tetris clone, but ... actually much more difficult", and Free Software For Dummies (Wiley, 2005). In its final issue in 2025, Linux Format retrospectively identified it, alongside Unreal Tournament, as one of the magazine's two unofficial games of choice; its former editor Paul Hudson recalled having played it a great many times.

== Distribution and legacy ==
Crack Attack! has continued to be packaged by several Linux distributions and was included on several magazine cover discs. Its Debian package is maintained by the Debian Games team. It was shipped by default on the Asus Eee PC subnotebook, and appeared on the cover discs of computer magazines in several countries between 2004 and 2010, such as Computer Bild in Germany, Komputer Świat in Poland and Linux For You in India. The game was also catalogued on The Linux Game Tome, one of the main directories of Linux games of the period.

== See also ==
- List of open-source video games
- Tetris Attack
