= .gy =

Internet country code top-level domain for Guyana

- Introduced: 13 September 1994
- TLD type: Country code top-level domain
- Status: Active
- Registry: University of Guyana
- Sponsor: University of Guyana
- Intended use: Entities connected with Guyana
- Documents: Registration form Acceptable Use Policy; Registrant Agreement
- Registry website: .gy Domain Name Registry

.gy is the Internet country code top-level domain (ccTLD) for Guyana. It is administered and managed by the Centre for Information Technology in the University of Guyana.

== Second-level domain names ==
- .co.gy
- .com.gy
- .org.gy
- .net.gy
- .edu.gy
- .gov.gy

== See also ==
- Internet in Guyana
- LACNIC
- Commonwealth Telecommunications Organisation
