= Alltel =

Former American telecommunications company

- Type: Private
- Industry: Telecommunications
- Predecessor: Western Wireless Corporation
- Founded: 1943; 83 years ago in Little Rock, Arkansas
- Founder: Charles Miller and Hugh Willbourn Jr.
- Defunct: 2016; 10 years ago
- Fate: Dissolved by AT&T
- Successors: Windstream (connectivity business); Verizon Wireless and AT&T Mobility (wireless operations)
- Headquarters: Little Rock, Arkansas, United States
- Products: Landline, Wireless
- Website: www.alltelwireless.com at the Wayback Machine (archived 2014-08-11)

Alltel was an American landline, wireless and general telecommunications services provider, primarily based in the United States. Before its wireless division was acquired by Verizon Wireless and AT&T, Alltel provided cellular service to 34 states and had approximately 13 million subscribers. As a regulatory condition of the acquisition by Verizon, a small portion of Alltel was spun off and continued to operate under the same name in six states, mostly in rural areas. Following the merger, Alltel remained the ninth largest wireless telecommunications company in the United States, with approximately 800,000 customers. On January 22, 2013, AT&T announced they were acquiring what remained of Alltel from Atlantic Tele-Network for $780 million in cash.

== History ==
In 1943, the Allied Telephone Company, a small business specializing in installing telephone poles and cabling for telephone companies across Arkansas, was founded by Charles Miller and Hugh Willbourn, Jr. In 1945, they opened a storefront in the Hillcrest district of Little Rock. The business sold electrical appliances in the front of the building, and the company enabled Wilbourn and Miller to buy telephone equipment wholesale.

Alltel's modern history begins in 1983 when Allied Telephone and Mid-Continent Telephone merged. Mid-Continent Telephone was originally a theatre company and started in 1931 by Eddie Ruben and Joe L. Floyd in Minnesota. In 1985, Alltel launched its first wireless system in Charlotte, North Carolina. In 1993, Alltel opened its first wireless retail store. In 1997, the company's wireless and wireline businesses were combined into a single organization.

On December 9, 2005, Alltel announced that it would become a wireless-only company, simultaneously merging and building a spin-off company for its wireline services. The wireline services business of Alltel merged with Valor Telecom and was named Windstream Communications on April 10, 2006. The merger-spinoff process ended July 17, 2006 when Windstream began operations.

Alltel's old logo (prior to 2005)

On May 20, 2007, Alltel announced an agreement to be sold to two private-equity firms: TPG Capital and GS Capital Partners. Under the deal, the two firms paid $71.50 a share in cash, or $27.5 billion, a 10% premium over Alltel's May 18, 2007 closing price.

At its peak, Alltel operated a network in 34 states, with a wireless coverage footprint comprising the largest network in the United States by area. The company focused on small to medium size cities providing wireless services to residential and business customers in all 50 states through roaming agreements with Verizon and Sprint. These agreements gave Alltel customers access to nationwide service, while providing those carriers coverage in rural areas.

On June 5, 2008, Verizon Wireless announced it would acquire the majority of Alltel Wireless in a deal valued at $28.1 billion. The merger was approved by the Federal Communications Commission on the condition that Verizon divest 105 Alltel markets. On May 8, 2009, AT&T announced it would acquire 79 of the divested wireless properties, including licenses, network assets, and 1.5 million current subscribers, primarily in rural areas across 18 states.

On April 26, 2010, Atlantic Tele-Network acquired the remaining 26 divested Alltel markets, including licenses, network assets and 800,000 subscribers. These remaining markets continued to be operated by Allied Wireless, a subsidiary of ATN, under the Alltel name. On September 20, 2013, AT&T announced they had completed the acquisition of Alltel from Atlantic Tele-Network. AT&T immediately began plans to upgrade the former Alltel network and to move customers to the AT&T network by midyear 2014. The transition completed in February 2015 with all Alltel customers becoming a part of the AT&T network. In early 2016, AT&T dissolved Alltel Wireless.

== Wireless network technology ==
Alltel's networks consisted of analog and digital systems operating primarily on the 850 MHz (3GPP2 Band Class 0) cellular band, much like Verizon Wireless. Native Alltel markets consisted of both analog (AMPS) and digital (CDMA) technologies. Virtually 100 percent of markets had been outfitted with 3G 1xEV-DO digital technology, which allows for additional battery life and faster download times when using Internet or BREW-based applications. Alltel posted a three phase turn down schedule in response to the FCC decision stating that by March 1, 2008 A and B side carriers are no longer required to support analog. The analog systems were retired by the end of 2008. While Alltel had not outlined its future path, merger partner Verizon Wireless had already announced plans to switch to GSM-based LTE.

=== Wireless network coverage ===
There were Alltel-owned and -operated networks in parts of 6 states. Alltel utilized roaming agreements with competing providers to provide coast-to-coast service. Roaming agreements in the United States were primarily with Verizon and Sprint until the completion of the migration of all customers to the AT&T network.

=== Handset and technical specifics ===
- Handsets were typically manufactured by Motorola, LG, Research In Motion (i.e., BlackBerry), Nokia, HTC, Samsung, Palm, and Pantech Curitel.
- Network equipment was manufactured by Lucent Technologies, Motorola, Nortel, Juniper Networks and Cisco.
- Phones used the Binary Runtime Environment for Wireless interface.

=== Wireless services ===
- Alltel Family Finder: Similar to Verizon Wireless's "Family Locator" service, Alltel offered a service dubbed Alltel Family Finder where users on family plans could download software to their children's phones and use GPS technology to acquire real-time location information either directly on their phone or on the computer. Users could also set up scheduled, automatic notifications of their child's location at set times, or use on-demand location checks to display the child's location on an interactive map.
- My Circle, launched on April 20, 2006, was a feature offered by Alltel Wireless that enabled customers to make and receive unlimited free calls to and from different phone numbers, including landlines. Initially, "My Circle" gave customers 10 different numbers per account. Customers were later given a choice of how many circle numbers they get (1, 5, 10, 15 or 20) based on the cost of their rate plan. On April 22, 2008, Alltel announced that all customers celebrating their second anniversary with "My Circle" would automatically receive one free "bonus" number added to their "My Circle" plan. In addition, on every second subsequent anniversary on an eligible "My Circle" plan, another bonus number would be added at no additional cost. Verizon Wireless adopted a My Circle-like feature called Friends & Family in February 2009. As Alltel customers are integrated and converted to Verizon Wireless' billing system, My Circle is being converted to Friends & Family.
- U Prepaid, introduced on January 30, 2006,' was similar to other prepaid services like Boost Mobile, Virgin Mobile or AT&T GoPhone. Features that made U Prepaid unique are that it allowed the customer to customize their plan with text messaging and unlimited calls to a certain number. U Prepaid allowed roaming on Sprint, Verizon, US Cellular, and other CDMA networks.
- Alltel Wi-Fi, introduced on September 28, 2007, provided laptop access to Wi-Fi hotspots in North and South America. Alltel Wi-Fi was available for purchase by anyone regardless of whether they reside in a traditional Alltel territory. Alltel also had bundled pricing of their 'Wireless Internet' service and 'Wi-Fi', allowing users to roam from one network to another on their laptop.
- Alltel Voice2TXT, introduced on December 17, 2007, was a feature that was available on any Alltel Wireless SMS text message capable phone which quickly converted incoming voicemails to text messages in the customer's inbox.
- PhotoCopter, introduced on April 16, 2008, was a feature that saved every camera phone picture customers' snap to their home computers and favorite web photo albums. PhotoCopter automatically transferred the taken picture to the PC.
- Alltel Wi-Fi mobile hot spot launched July 7, 2011. This service allows customers to connect 5 devices for internet service at the same time.

== Commercials ==
After Alltel's November 2004 announcement that Campbell-Ewald of Detroit would be their primary advertising agency, Alltel used lookalikes of rival cell phone companies' primary advertising characters along with Alltel's spokesman, played by comedian Chad Brokaw. After competing networks complained, the promotional campaign featured this notice on television and the website: "Our lawyers would like to inform you some of the characters you see here are not associated with Alltel. They are look-alikes. The characters, not our lawyers." In the first commercial, at an Alltel store, Alltel representative Chad spoke to representatives of five competitors to his circle. A second commercial was set in a bowling alley. The third commercial took place in a court room, with the faces of the other carriers blurred. In "The Century's Trial of the Century", Edward Maxwell Von Houten, attorney for the People Against My Circle Foundation, sued Chad for attempting to force people into calling circles.

After that, Alltel started a series of commercials involving Chad, bragging about Alltel's service and using the theme music "Come and Get Your Love". The parodied competitors, called "Sales Guys" are perpetually frustrated by their failures and less popularity, even going so far as to harass and threaten him, albeit with less than effective results. The Sales Guys are played by professional actors Matthew Brent (Verizon), Scott Halberstadt (Cingular/AT&T), Ian Gould (T-Mobile), and Michael Busch (Sprint), who was later replaced by Adam Herschman. Each representative wears a shirt with the color of the company they represent, as well as name tags to represent their company. Most ads in 2007 had the Cingular/AT&T guy wearing two name tags—one each for Cingular & AT&T—while that brand was transiting to AT&T. As of 2008, they added a snobbish wizard into the ads. The Christmas 2007/2008 ads uses stop-motion animation, parodying the Rankin-Bass Christmas specials.

The campaign included a MySpace page, and Campbell-Ewald Digital created The Man Cave with its own web site. The fourth and fifth commercials features employees of other carriers' mall stores trying to convince Chad to end My Circle with $8.00. The sixth has Chad giving RAZRs as Christmas gifts to them. Since this service and advertising campaign started, other carriers started adding similar services. For example, T-Mobile introduced "My Faves" in the fall of 2006.

In 2010, markets sold to Verizon Wireless aired a special commercial with both Chad and Paul Marcarelli as the real "Verizon Guy". Alltel and Chad produced a Christmas edition commercial later that year for remaining Alltel markets, featured at Longbranch Coffee House located in Carbondale, Illinois.

== Sponsorships ==
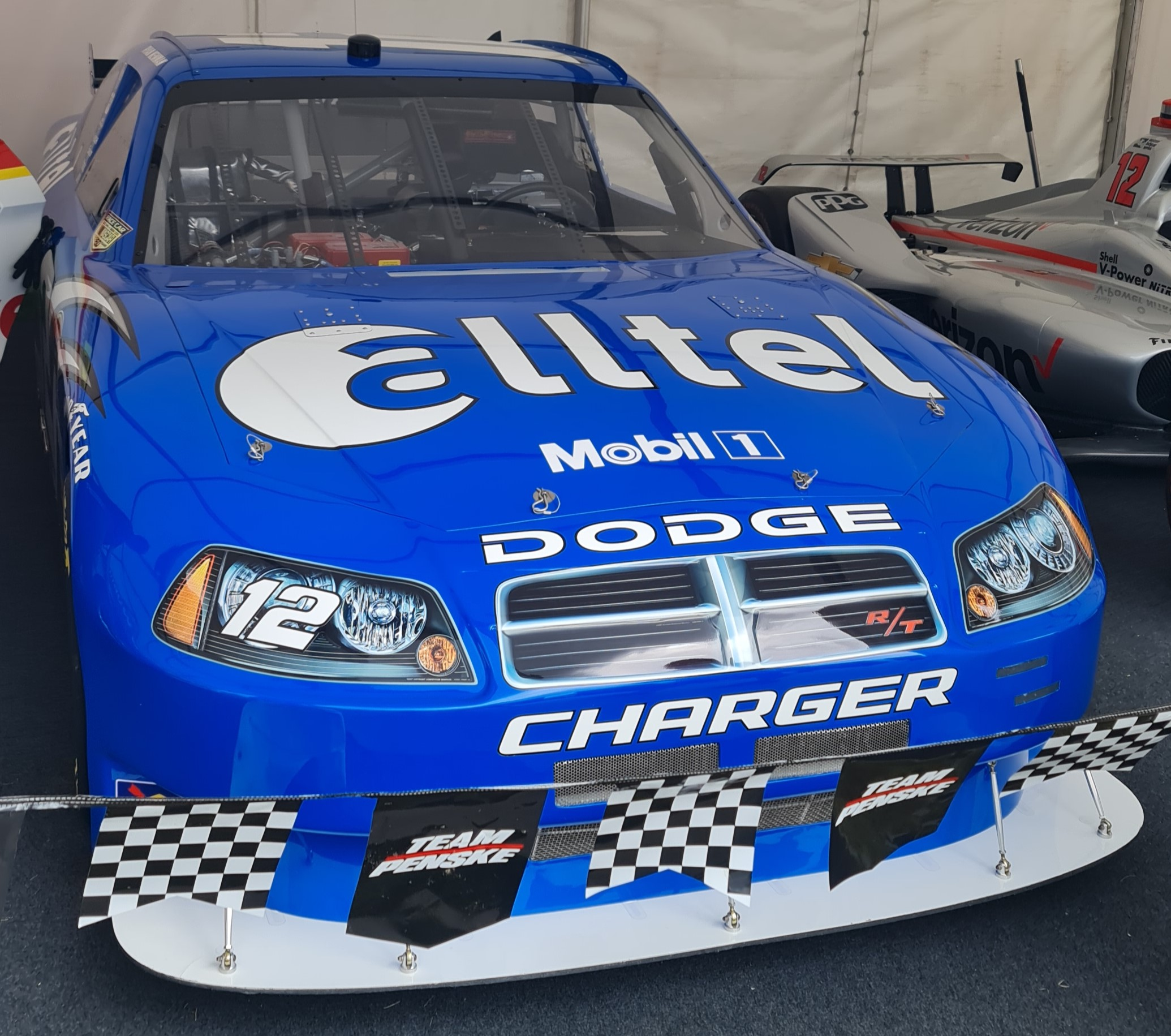
The No. 12 Alltel-sponsored NASCAR car of Ryan Newman

=== Former structure naming rights ===
- Alltel Stadium (formerly Jacksonville municipal stadium, now EverBank Stadium), Jacksonville, Florida
- Alltel Pavilion at Walnut Creek, Raleigh, North Carolina
- Alltel Arena, North Little Rock, Arkansas
- Alltel Ice Den, Scottsdale, Arizona
- Alltel Pavilion at the Stuart C. Siegel Center, Virginia Commonwealth University, Richmond, Virginia
- Maxwell Field at Alltel Stadium, Winona State University, Winona, Minnesota
- Alltel Center, Mankato, Minnesota

=== Racing ===
- Herzog Motorsports No. 92 (Jimmie Johnson, 2000 NASCAR Busch Series)
- Penske Racing South No. 02, No. 12, and No. 39 (Ryan Newman, 2000–2008 NASCAR Cup Series)
