= ATN International =

American telecommunications company

ATN International, Inc.
- Formerly: Atlantic Tele-Network, Inc.
- Type: Public
- Traded as: Nasdaq: ATNI
- Industry: Telecommunications
- Founded: 1987; 39 years ago
- Headquarters: Beverly, Massachusetts, U.S.
- Services: Local and long-distance telephone service; Internet access; Wireless Internet access; Digital phone; Fiber-optic Internet; Wholesale
- Revenue: US$451.206 million (2018)
- Operating income: US$62.097 million (2018)
- Net income: US$36.014 million (2018)
- Total assets: US$1,109.386 million (2018)
- Number of employees: 1000
- Subsidiaries: Commnet Wireless (Choice Broadband); One Communications Guyana (80%); Stilmark; Fireminds; Logic; Vibrant Energy; Alaska Communications; Geoverse
- Website: www.atni.com

ATN International, Inc. (ATN) formerly known as Atlantic Tele-Network, Inc., is an American publicly traded telecommunications company that is headquartered in Beverly, Massachusetts. It operates digital wireless, wireline, and both terrestrial and submarine fiber optic networks, serving markets that are geographically separated and technically challenging, such as the plains, deserts, and mountainous areas of the United States.

ATN's expertise is operating in underserved or niche markets, growing its business organically and through acquisitions by providing an alternative to national carriers.

On March 12, 2004, the company reported total operating revenues rose 11% to $78.9 million, as compared to $70.8 million for 2002.

== Wired services ==
ATNI also operates Wireline and Fiber Services through GT&T (Guyana). In July 2016 ATNI acquired the Virgin Islands landline and wireless assets of Innovative Communications Corporation from Rural Utilities Cooperative Finance Corporation due to foreclosure. The combined United States Virgin Islands operating company is named Viya.

== Wireless service ==
ATN operates wireless service in the United States as both a wholesale and a regional cellular provider via its subsidiary companies of Commnet Wireless, LLC (US)(Wholesale) in the western United States and Viya in the US Virgin Islands.

ATN also operates international cellular service as One in Bermuda. ATN previously owned Islandcom Wireless in Turks & Caicos (now defunct and had its former customers transferred to the Liberty Latin America-owned LIME/FLOW).

== Acquisition of Alltel assets ==
On April 26, 2010, ATN acquired certain former Alltel wireless assets that Verizon Wireless was required to divest as part of the regulatory approvals granted for its purchase of Alltel earlier that year. Since that time, ATN, through its Alltel subsidiary Allied Wireless, has served subscribers primarily in rural areas across Georgia, North Carolina, South Carolina, Illinois, Ohio, and Idaho.

=== Sale of Alltel assets ===
On January 22, 2013, AT&T announced that it had signed an agreement with Atlantic Tele-Network to acquire the company's U.S. retail wireless operations, operated under the Alltel brand, for $780 million in cash. Under terms of the agreement, AT&T will acquire wireless properties, including licenses, network assets, retail stores and approximately 585,000 subscribers.

== Divestiture of Sovernet ==
In August 2016, ATN announced that it agreed sell its New England operations in Sovernet Communications and Sovernet's subsidiary Independent Optical Network (ION), operations to Oak Hill Capital Partners by early 2017.

== See also ==
- List of mobile network operators of the Americas
- List of telecommunications regulatory bodies
