= Vybz 100.1 FM =

Guyanese radio station

Vybz 100.1 FM is a Guyanese radio station owned by the state-run National Communications Network. The station descended from the British-run service, which was subsequently renamed Radio Roraima and Fresh FM.

== History ==
Its history traces back to the first radio experiments conducted by the British in the 1920s and 30s. In 1926, using both shortwave and telephone systems. With limited technical training, programming was limited to two hours of programming a week produced by the BBC's Daventry transmitter, which was then relayed over the Georgetown telephone system. This was replaced in 1927 by a shortwave system, VRY, which shut down in 1931 due to financial constraints. Seeing the success of cricket broadcasts on radio, two private stations were set up, VP3BG and VP3MR. These were merged in May 1938 to form the British Guiana United Broadcasting Company, operating under the callsign ZFY. AM broadcasts began in 1949.

In July 1950, British company Rediffusion bought a controlling stake in BGUBC, renaming it to Radio Demerara. The station moved to a new studio in 1955, using the most up-to-date equipment available at the time. A new transmitter and receiver station in Sparendaam opened in 1957.

On January 1, 1979, Rediffusion sold Radio Demerara to the government, who had operated its radio station since 1958. On May 1, 1979, both stations were put under the new Guyana Broadcasting Corporation. On July 1, 1980, Radio Demerara was renamed Channel 1, in line with its "one station, two channels" policy. The station operated on AM 760 and FM 100.1. Eight years later, the station was renamed Radio Roraima. The station was almost on the verge of shutting down in 1993 due to a report issued by Rafiq Khan, which suggested the downsizing of the state media outlets, as well as the shutdown of NCN Television During this period, which survived the merger of GBC and GTV to form the current NCN, the station was nicknamed Double R.

In September 2012, NCN announced at GuyExpo 2012 that the station would be renamed Fresh FM. In early November, the station removed its Indian music programs, Chutney Beat, Filmy Duniya and Gems of India.

The station was renamed Vybz 100.1 FM in 2018 and carried the 2018 FIFA World Cup on radio.
