= C. N. Sharma =

Chandra Narine Sharma (born 5 August 1952) is a Guyanese activist, television station owner, comedian talk show host, and politician.

== Life ==
Through his television station on his talk show Voice of the People he highlights the poor living conditions of Guyanese people.

Sharma founded one of Guyana's first privately owned television stations; CNS TV 6, (previously TV 12). It was established 7 June 1992, out of his own home, when there were only three other television stations in existence. It focused on local programming. In 2004, a fire destroyed most of the station, prompting a move. In 2011, CNS TV 6 was banned for airing commentary that "sought to create discord among denominations in the Christian community" in defiance of the national constitution. In 2018, Sharma received a radio license.

In 2010, he was accused of rape of under-age sisters. He collapsed during one of his court appearances, and was granted bail for GYD $2mil. The charge was dropped in 2016.

He was a leader of the Justice for All Party which supported APNU until 2020.

He was at one time voted as the most popular Guyanese persona.
