= Hits and Jams TV =

Hits and Jams Television
- Country: Guyana
- Broadcast area: National
- Headquarters: Georgetown

Programming
- Language: English
- Picture format: 480i (NTSC)

Ownership
- Owner: HJ Entertainment

History
- Launched: 2007
- Replaced: STVS

Availability

Terrestrial
- UHF: Channel 21 (Georgetown)

Hits and Jams Television (HJTV) is a Guyanese television network owned by HJ Entertainment. The station broadcasts on UHF channel 21 and is also available on ENet cable on channel 20.

== History ==
The station started broadcasting in 2007, first being tasked with boosting the Guyanese recognition of Jamaican singer Alaine, who came to the 2007 Guyana Music Festival. Initially limited to music videos and call-in programs, it increased the scope of its content to include entertainment segments, pageants, exclusive interviews, and the production of local shows. The station broadcast using the STVS license (UHF 21 and cable 72), which was used to relay TBN. STVS restored the right to operate the frequency in April 2008, though HJTV programming resumed by late July.

In November 2008, it aired Glamour, a fashion magazine. At the time, most HJTV presenters were known for their lack of pronunciation fluency and conversation tone. Glamour was also reportedly paid by two local businesses, Changing Room and Kings Jewellery World. In 2009, it held the Inter-Ward Basketball Tournament in collaboration with the Georgetown Amateur Basketball Association. On the afternoon of December 30, 2009, two gunmen attacked its television studios, stealing an undisclosed sum of money, which was believed to be worth millions of dollars.

The channel carried the 2010 Jamzone International pageant (as its parent company was the organizer) alongside NCN Television. HJTV aired a parody of the popular Gangnam Style music video in September 2012, Ghansham Style, with the face of Joel Ghansham edited over PSY's. A fire damaged the HJ media outlets on 8 September 2016. Two days later, the station resumed full operations. Beginning in April 2010, the channel and NCN aired Guyana Model, a six-week competition created by Sonia Noel. It was one of the stations that aired the pilot episode of the local educational puppet series Hidden Treasures, alongside Safe TV.
