= WRHM (Guyanan TV station) =

Guyanese television network

- Country: Guyana
- Broadcast area: National
- Headquarters: Georgetown

Programming
- Language: English
- Picture format: 480i (NTSC)

Ownership
- Owner: WRHM Inc.

History
- Launched: mid-1980s
- Closed: 2025

Links
- Website: https://www.capitolnewsonline.com/

Availability

Terrestrial
- VHF: Channel 7

WRHM, also known as WRHM 7, was a Guyanese over-the-air television network owned by WRHM Inc., it is the second oldest television station in the country and the first to be available entirely free-to-air. In addition to its main station on channel 7, it operates a second station on channel 38.

== History ==
It is unknown when exactly did WRHM sign on. Before its launch, there was only one television station in Guyana, VCT Network, which was a scrambled outlet in its early years. WRHM was the first to broadcast its signals without subscription. WRHM was given two licenses, even though it was not originally registered as a company, which it did so in 1992. In February 1998, WRHM announced that it would relocate its second channel (channel 6) to UHF channel 38, with the vacated VHF frequency being used by CNS. The move was complete in April.

On 6 April 2000, WRHM was the Guyanese carrier of a special CARICOM discussion program on the establishment of the Caribbean Court of Justice. The station, alongside VCT, was the target of criticism due to the airing of the Andrew Douglas tape.

It obtained the rights to the 2008 Olympic Games alongside the Caribbean Media Corporation and US network NBC. The channel would carry rights from both feeds, with CMC favoring Caribbean athletes. This caused a minor incident with NCN Television, causing it to prevent the channel from airing any NBC outlet without consent from the parties involved.

The station was one of several that pooled its resources to combat a GUY$2.5 license fee. On 1 October 2013, the station received a warning from the regulator to apply for a new license by 31 October, otherwise, the station would be considered illegal under the new laws.

Its founder Rex McKay died on 21 December 2023, at the age of 95.
