= Haitel =

Haiti Telecommunication International, S.A.
- Type: Private
- Industry: Telecommunications
- Founded: 1998
- Headquarters: 38, rue Darguin; Pétion-Ville, Haiti
- Key people: Franck N. Ciné (Chairman and CEO)
- Services: Wireless; Telephone
- Website: haitelonline.com

Haiti Telecommunication International, S.A. or Haitel (French: Haïti Télécommunications Internationales) is a Haitian mobile phone and Internet service provider, using CDMA technology.

== History ==
Haitel was founded by Franck N. Ciné, a former MCI/Worldcom executive, and started operating in March 1999. It was the first mobile phone company to operate in Haiti until September of the same year with the arrival of Comcel/Voilà, using TDMA technology.

In 2006, Haitel enhanced its network to CDMA 2000.

Haitel was built under contract by Nortel Networks with staff primarily from the US, Canada. The "switch" located in Petion-ville was operated on commercial hydro power a small percentage of the time. Diesel generators were used to maintain power to the facility and the cell-sites.
