= National Rural Utilities Cooperative Finance Corporation =

American nonprofit cooperative

National Rural Utilities Cooperative Finance Corporation (CFC)
- Company type: Cooperative
- Industry: Financial Services, Electric Utilities
- Founded: 1969
- Headquarters: Dulles, Virginia, USA
- Products: Loans, investments
- Number of employees: 232 (2015)
- Website: www.nrucfc.coop

The National Rural Utilities Cooperative Finance Corporation (CFC) is a member-owned nonprofit cooperative that provides financial products to America's rural electric cooperative network. CFC was established in 1969 to raise funds from the capital markets to supplement the loan programs for electric cooperatives offered by the U.S. Department of Agriculture’s (USDA) Rural Utilities Service (RUS), previously Rural Electrification Administration (REA).

While CFC is not a government-sponsored enterprise (GSE), it (along with its telephone affiliate, RTFC), has forged an effective public-private partnership with RUS. This partnership enables CFC's utility borrowers to access an array of financing options including those provided by the federal government.

Together, CFC and its affiliates, the National Cooperative Services Corporation (NCSC) and the Rural Telephone Finance Cooperative (RTFC), provide financing to 1,460 member organizations and affiliates in 49 states, the District of Columbia and two territories. Rural electric systems serve 12 percent of all consumers of electricity in the United States and its territories, account for approximately 10 percent of total sales of electricity and own about 5 percent of electric generation capacity.

At the end of FY2015 (May 31, 2015), CFC's total loans outstanding were $21.5 billion, and its owners had $4 billion invested in CFC securities. About 98 percent of CFC’s loan portfolio was with electric borrowers and 2 percent was with the telecommunications sector.

== Organizational structure ==
Overall policy for CFC is set by a 23-member Board of Directors, representing 10 geographic districts and the National Rural Electric Cooperative Association (NRECA), the network's national trade association, and one At-Large member who serves as the Audit Committee Financial Expert. CFC's Board is democratically elected and consists of both cooperative utility directors and managers. CFC operates from its corporate headquarters in Dulles, Virginia, with a staff of 232 employees, including regional representatives located throughout the country.

== Stock Symbols ==
Cooperative Finance Corporation (NRUCFC) is traded on the New York Stock Exchange. The company’s symbol is NRUC.

== Affiliate Organizations ==
CFC manages and funds the Rural Telephone Finance Cooperative (RTFC), an organization that provides financing to the rural telecommunications industry. CFC also manages and funds the National Cooperative Services Corporation (NCSC), an organization that provides electric cooperatives with specialized financing services that supplement the financial services of CFC.
