= CNS (chemical weapon) =

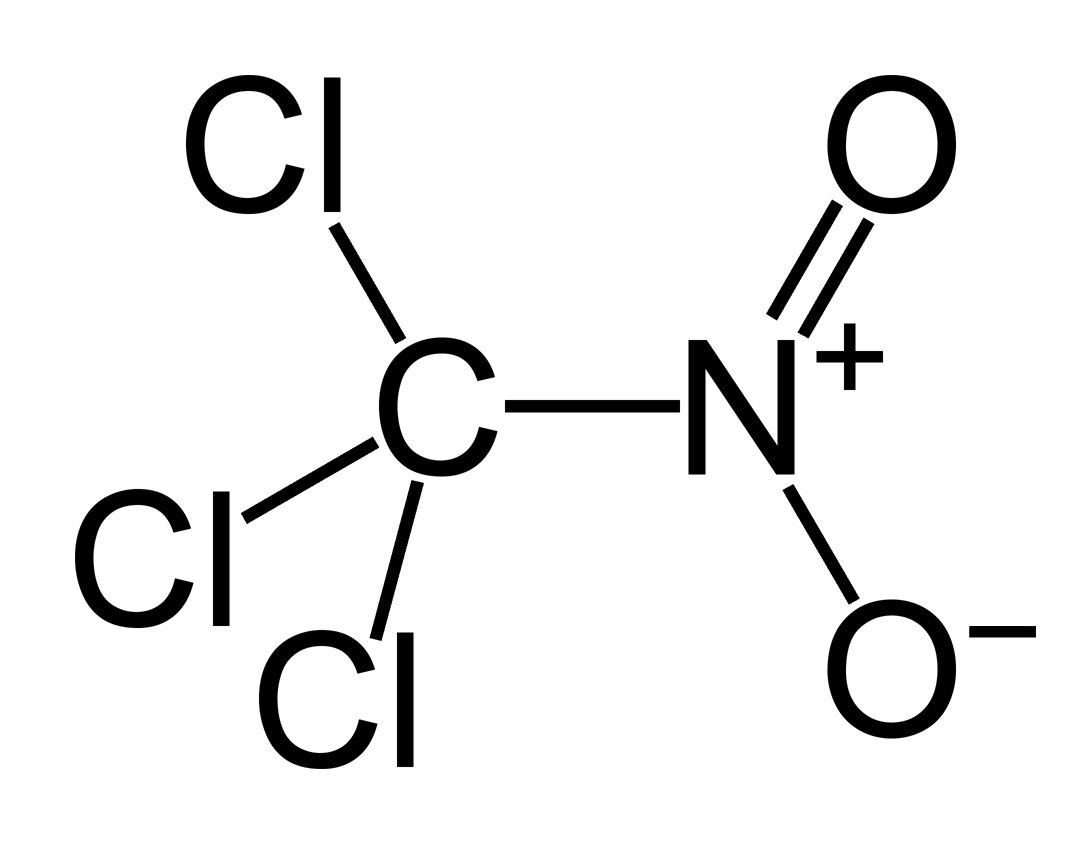

Properties
Appearance	Liquid
Odor	Flypaper-like
- Except where otherwise noted, data are given for materials in their standard state (at 25 °C [77 °F], 100 kPa). Infobox references

CNS is a mixture of chloroacetophenone, chloropicrin and chloroform that is used as a chemical warfare agent. CNS has the lachrymatory effects of chloroacetophenone and choking effects of chloropicrin. It has a flypaper-like odor.

CNS was used as a riot control agent, but it is no longer used.
