= City News Service =

Regional news agency covering Southern California

City News Service, Inc. is a regional news agency covering Southern California. City News Service clients include local and regional newspapers, broadcasters and websites.

== History ==
The company was founded in 1928 by Marvin Willard and Welland Gordon to provide both national wire services and local news outlets with local stories, including coverage of Hollywood and city government.

Florabelle Muir, an LA gossip columnist, purchased the service from its founder(s) in the early 1940s. In the early 1950s, Fletcher Bowron, the former mayor of Los Angeles and Joe Quinn, the United Press bureau chief in Los Angeles, who later served as deputy mayor of Los Angeles, purchased the company. Bowron tired of the news business and decided to run for an open Superior Court judge seat, the same position he held before running for mayor of Los Angeles with a promise to clean up the city's notoriously corrupt police department. After again assuming the bench, Bowron sold his interest in City News to Joe Quinn. After Quinn died in 1979, his widow, Grace Quinn, assumed ownership of the company but soon decided that practicing law, not journalism, was her true passion.

Her eldest son, Tom Quinn, assumed control of City News in 1980. Quinn began his journalism career as a reporter for ABC News in Chicago, worked at the CBS-TV affiliate in Sacramento and then founded his own company, Radio News West, which supplied news actualities to several dozen radio stations throughout California. He later managed Jerry Brown's successful campaign for governor of California in 1974 and served as chairman of the state Air Resources Board from 1975 to 1979. He appointed a close associate, Douglas Faigin, as CNS editor and together they expanded the business by opening new bureaus in Orange County, San Diego and Riverside County. They also doubled the number of clients to include television stations, networks, cable news outlets, daily and weekly newspapers, reality TV programs, government agencies and news websites. Tom Quinn retired as CNS chairman in 2013, and Faigin assumed that position. When Faigin retired in 2021, Quinn became non-executive Chairman and Lori Streifler, CNS's top editor, became president. Marty Sauerzopf is now the editor, and Gil Cunha is the city editor.

Quinn, who now lives in Reno, Nevada, continues as the primary CNS owner but spends most of his time on his extensive business interests in Nevada, including serving as president of Americom Broadcasting and Reno Media Group, the dominant broadcaster in Northern Nevada and Lake Tahoe.

City News Service covers city and county governments, courts and public safety.
