= CNS TV 6 =

Guyanese television channel

- Country: Guyana
- Broadcast area: National
- Headquarters: Georgetown

Programming
- Language: English

Ownership
- Owner: C. N. Sharma

History
- Launched: 7 June 1992
- Closed: January 2025
- Former names: CNS TV 12 (1992-1998)

Availability

Terrestrial
- VHF: Analog VHF 6

CNS TV 6 was a private television station owned by C. N. Sharma. One of the first stations of its kind in Guyana, it was established on channel 12 in 1992, before moving to channel 6 in 1998.

== History ==
CNS TV started broadcasting on 7 June 1992, in a section of his own home in Lacytown. It was the fourth television station in Guyana, behind Guyana Television, WRHM and VCT. In June 1993, videographer Tyrone Ali joined the station.

The station initially operated on VHF channel 12. In February 1998, CNS announced its move to channel 6, which had been planned since 3 March 1993 at earliest. The new frequency was originally occupied by WRHM as a secondary outlet (the main outlet was on channel 7), which was moving to UHF channel 38 as consequence. A fire affected its facilities in 2004, prompting it to move to a new location.

On 7 January 2025, CNS TV 6 had their final live stream (streaming from their analog channel to Facebook), and the show "Good Morning Guyana" was changed to a new account without any mention stating it was on CNS TV 6. In early 2025, a new channel named Ignite Television would launch and replace CNS TV 6.

== Controversies ==
In 2011, CNS TV 6 was banned for airing commentary that "sought to create discord among denominations in the Christian community" in defiance of the national constitution.
