= ENet =

Guyanese telecommunications company

- Company type: Private
- Industry: Telecommunications
- Founded: 2003
- Founder: Vishok Persaud
- Headquarters: Georgetown, Guyana
- Area served: Guyana
- Key people: Vishok Persaud (CEO)
- Services: Internet, mobile telephony, television
- Website: www.enetworks.gy

ENet (formerly E-Networks Inc.) is a telecommunications operator in Guyana. Founded in 2003 by Vishok Persaud, it provides fixed broadband, mobile services and subscription television. ENet launched a 4G/5G VoLTE mobile network in 2022-2023 and operates a locally owned international submarine cable between Guyana and Barbados.

== History ==
E-Networks Inc. was established in 2003 and initially offered cable television and internet services in Georgetown. By 2013 the company introduced new digital TV packages under the DreamTV brand, including HD channels via a regional HBO arrangement. In 2014 E-Networks became the first Latin American customer of the O3b medium Earth orbit satellite system to extend broadband where terrestrial fibre was impractical.

In 2019-2020 the company completed the X-Link submarine fibre connection between Georgetown and Barbados, adding a new international route for Guyana. The Kingston landing station was visited by government officials in January 2020. In August 2021 authorities amended ENet's permits to allow an extension of its subsea system toward Suriname for redundancy.

After 2020 the company expanded fibre and wireless services beyond the capital. In mid-2021 ENet announced a GY$1.2 billion project to land a subsea cable to the Essequibo Coast (Region 2, Pomeroon-Supenaam). In December 2021 ENet launched OnFiber FTTH and fixed-wireless broadband in Linden.

In 2022-2023 ENet partnered with Mavenir to deploy a core network for LTE/5G and opened mobile service. On 1 January 2023 President Irfaan Ali became the first official 5G subscriber. In the first half of 2024 Ookla Speedtest reported ENet recorded the fastest median fixed and mobile speeds in Guyana. Also in 2024, local coverage noted ENet's presentation of its digital-transformation approach at a TM Forum/Salesforce event in Dallas. In August 2025 the company commissioned a submarine fibre link to Bartica (Region 7, Cuyuni-Mazaruni), connecting the town to the national network.

== Operations and infrastructure ==
=== Services ===
ENet provides fixed broadband over fibre-to-the-home/business (OnFiber) and fixed-wireless access using LTE/5G. The company also offers pay television and IPTV under the DreamTV brand. Mobile service is delivered on a 4G/5G network using VoLTE for voice.

ENet operates a national fibre backbone integrating terrestrial and submarine segments. International connectivity includes a link to Barbados, with approval granted for an extension toward Suriname for redundancy. Domestically the network supports FTTH and fixed-wireless roll-outs in coastal and selected inland areas, including Linden, and was extended to Bartica in 2025 via a submarine fibre connection.

=== Network, coverage and regulation ===
ENet operates a national fibre backbone integrating terrestrial and submarine segments. International connectivity includes a link to Barbados, with approval granted for an extension toward Suriname for redundancy. Domestically the network supports FTTH and fixed-wireless roll-outs in coastal and selected inland areas, including Linden, and was extended to Bartica in 2025 via a submarine fibre connection. The mobile network uses a core supplied by Mavenir and supports LTE and 5G with VoLTE.

=== Regulatory framework ===
Regulatory oversight is provided by the Telecommunications Agency (Office of the Prime Minister of Guyana) and the Public Utilities Commission. Guyana's telecoms market was liberalized on 6 October 2020 with the commencement of the Telecommunications Act 2016. Licenses were then issued to ENet, GTT and Digicel for nationwide public telecommunications services.

== See also ==
- Telecommunications in Guyana
