= National Communications Network, Guyana =

State-owned broadcasting company

National Communications Network
- Type: Radio and Television
- Country: Guyana
- Established: 2004
- Launch date: April 1958
- Former names: GTV, GBC
- Radio: Fresh FM, Voice of Guyana, Hot FM
- Television: Analog VHF 11, Digital 1-2
- Official website: http://www.ncnguyana.com/

National Communications Network (NCN) is a national, state-owned television and radio broadcasting corporation in Guyana. It was formed in 2004 through the merger of the government radio service, Guyana Broadcasting Corporation (GBC), and the government-run television service, GTV. NCN's studios are situated on Homestretch Avenue in Georgetown.

== History ==
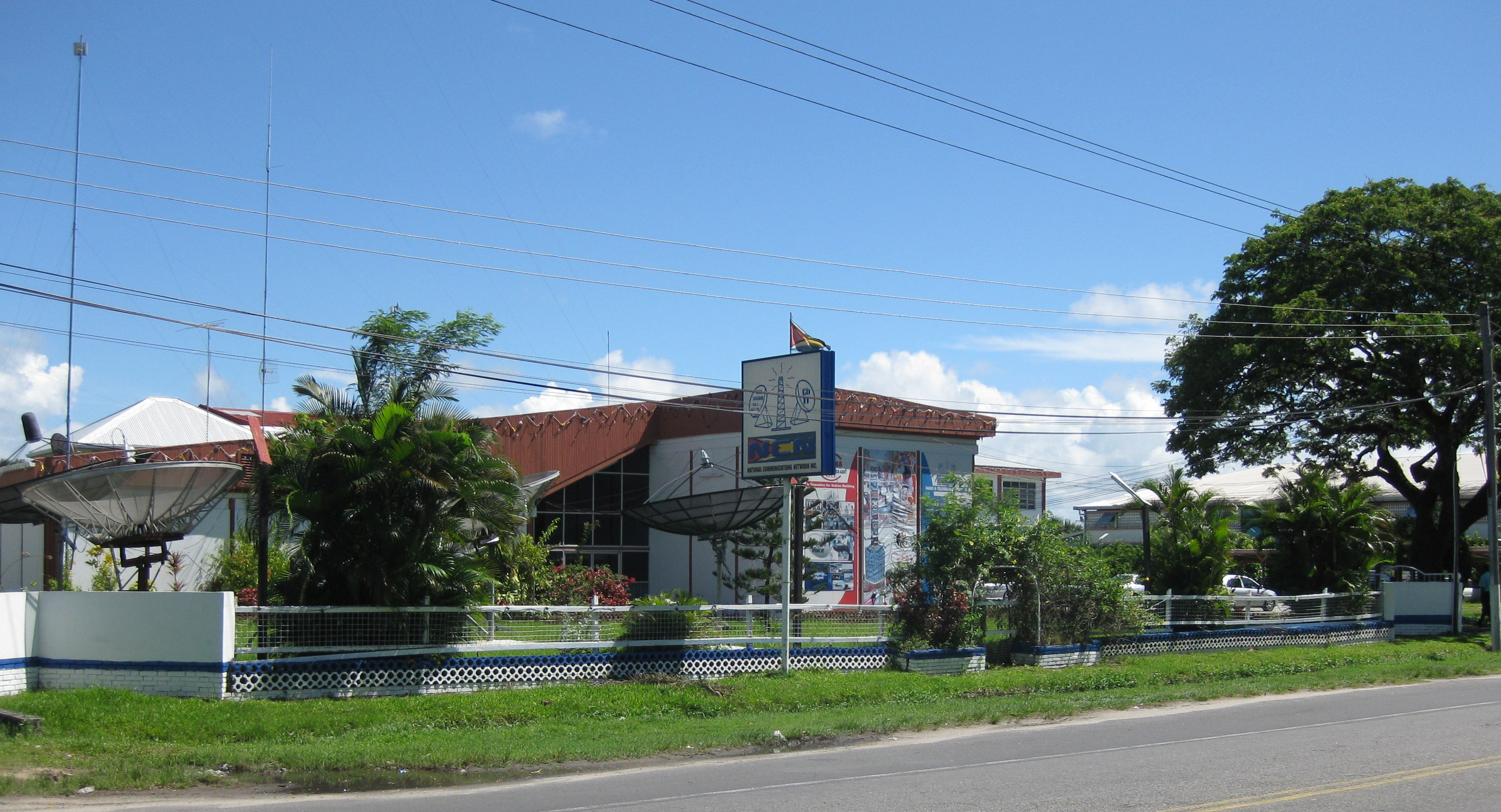
NCN Studios in 2009

NCN is the descendant of two of Guyana's first radio services: Radio Demerara, which was founded in 1951, and British Guiana Broadcasting Service (BGBS), which was founded in December 1958. The former was a British-owned company, and its licence required the station to broadcast BBC material for 21 hours a week, and programmes provided by the UK's Central Office of Information (in London) for 10 hours a week. The latter focused primarily on sports programmes and the coverage of special events.

In 1968, two years after Independence, the Government of Guyana took over BGBS's broadcasting facilities, which were located at the Broadcasting House on High Street in Georgetown, and the company was renamed the Guyana Broadcasting Service (GBS). In 1979, the Government of Guyana acquired Radio Demerara as well, and the merger of these two radio services resulted in the Guyana Broadcasting Corporation (GBC). Both companies were operating at a loss in October 2003, when a decision was taken to cut about 200 employees from both GBC and GTV, with the merger taking place effective 2 January 2004. The aim of merging the companies was to make it financially viable. On 1 March 2004, GBC and the Guyana Television Broadcasting Company (GTV) combined to form NCN.

=== Radio Demerara ===
In 1935, the demand for cricket commentary motivated the development of early radio broadcasting. Two stations came about at this time, VP3BG and VPSMR, and they were eventually amalgamed into Station ZFY. Station ZFY operated from the Post Office until the building was consumed by the Great Fire of Georgetown in February 1945. After the fire it was relocated to North Road and New Garden Street. ZFY secured the first medium wave transmitter in 1945.

After being purchased by Overseas Rediffusion Ltd. in 1950, the station was renamed Radio Demerara. The station was moved to a professional studio in 1955, and in 1957 a new transmitting and receiving station was erected at Sparendaam on the East Coast Demerara. Licensing requirements included broadcasting of BBC material for 21 hours a week, and programmes provided by the Central Office of Information in London for 10 1/2 hours a week. In 1958, a second radio station by Demerara's parent company, British Guiana Broadcasting Service (BGBS), was made with a focus on broadcasting special events and sports coverage.

Radio Demerara had regular broadcasting of Indian music since the 1950s, starting with programing by Ayub Hamid and in 1959, Eshri Singh, whose show featured local performers of Indian musical genre.

When the government of Guyana took over BGBS in 1968, additional facilities at Hadfield street Lodge were created and opened the station to technical aid from BBC's Bush House in London.

After the official inauguration of the GBC in 1979, the Guyana government acquired all assets of Radio Demerara from Rediffusion organization, Broadcasting Relay (Overseas) Limited.

== Radio Service ==
NCN runs three radio services: Vybz 100.1 FM, re-branded in 2012, formerly Radio Roraima (formerly Channel 1), which uses the radio frequency 760 AM (760 kilohertz on the medium wave band; no longer broadcasting); Voice of Guyana (formerly Channel 2), which uses the radio frequency 560 AM (560 kilohertz on the medium wave band); and an 102.1FM service — 98.1 Hot FM — which uses the radio frequency 98.1 FM. All three services are controlled by the government.

== Television Service ==
NCN's television service (NCN Television) is broadcast on Channel 11 available with an analog antenna, with various regional channels in Berbice, Essequibo, Linden and Demerara. Television service in Guyana began in 1963, then switched to color broadcasting in 1979.

== See also ==
- Telecommunications in Guyana
- Radio in Guyana
- Olga Lopes-Seale, Guyanese-Barbadian Radio broadcaster
- Shana Yardan, poet and broadcaster
