= Guyana Learning Channel =

Guyanese television channel

- Country: Guyana
- Broadcast area: National
- Headquarters: Georgetown

Programming
- Language: English
- Picture format: 480i

Ownership
- Owner: Guyana Learning Channel Trust (Ministry of Education.)
- Sister channels: GLC TV, GLC Jr., GLC Elementary, GLC Teen, GLC Plus, GLC Discover, GLC Elevate

History
- Launched: 1 April 2011
- Former names: ETBS, TLC Guyana

Links
- Website: https://guyanalearningchannel.com

The Guyana Learning Channel (GLC) is a network of six digital educational television channels and one analog in Guyana owned by the Guyana Learning Channel Trust, which, in turn, is owned by the Ministry of Education. The channels broadcast mainly educational programs; feature films are also broadcast in prime time, followed by a repeat of the daytime schedule.

== History ==
The Ministry of Education announced the creation of GLC on 16 September 2010, and launched it on 1 April 2011, initially with the bulk of its programming coming from abroad, being criticized for the lack of relevant local content. A five-year contract with Television Guyana was signed in 2010 to carry the signal nationwide by satellite. Around May, its signal expanded to Berbice on channel 3, fed by satellite, prone to periodic interruptions.

Beginning in June 2016, the channel started carrying "programmes of national interest", among them being agricultural programs. As of 2013, it had owned 20 satellite dishes, 16 dish stands, 17 antennas, 17 receivers and installation by means of nearly $7 million coming from TVG.

In 2020, GLC's coverage area in the hinterland increased significantly, enabling its wide coverage in areas with limited internet reach. From April 2021, it was made available in Region Nine.

In June 2021, the channel premiered Whiz Kids to prepare Grade Six students for the National Assessment. On 16 September 2023, the network premiered The Amazing World of Cho, a local animated series featuring a girl from the hinterland.

On 18 October 2025, several channels belonging to GLC's network became encrypted, cutting access from some people to watch them, the only unencrypted channels are GLC Elevate, and GLC Discover

In 2026, GLC Plus rebranded to MOE Central with no official announcement or logo change on cable services. It is unclear when the channel rebranded

Later, on 19 August 2026, GLC Discover re-added their screenbug after removing it in 2021. On the 30th, MOE Central and GLC EleVate re-added theirs, featuring the new MOE Central logo. Then lastly, on the 7th of October, the screenbugs for GLC Elementary, GLC Teen, and GLC Jr. were re-added.

== Channels ==
The Guyana Learning Channel network includes the following digital channels:

- GLC Junior (channel 24-52), with programming for preschoolers
- GLC Elementary (channel 24-32), with programming for primary students
- GLC Teen (channel 24-48), with programming for secondary students
- MOE Central (channel 24-44), with programming on Guyanese culture, history, folklore, and national development
- GLC Discover (channel 24-40), featuring science, industry insights, career exploration, and skill development
- GLC Elevate (channel 24-36), a channel for adult learners offering literacy programs, vocational training, DIY skills, and opportunities for personal development.

The analog transmitters carry GLC TV, which offers a selection of programming from the other services.

  - Georgetown: Channel 29/80
  - Port Kaituma: Channel 10
  - Essequibo: Channel 10
  - Mabaruma: Channel 3
  - Bartica: Channel 3
  - Orealla: Channel 10
  - Corentyne: Channels 3 and 24
  - New Amsterdam: Channel 3
  - Linden: Channel 10
  - Kwakwani: Channel 10
  - Ituni: Channel 3
  - Lethem: Channel 5
  - Annai: Channel 5
  - Karasabai: Channel 3
  - Aishalton: Channel 3
  - Mahdia: Channel 3

== Criticism and controversies ==
=== Lack of local programming ===
Since the beginning, GLC was heavily dependent on foreign programming, with its local output being heavily limited. In its first few weeks on air, such output largely consisted of brief segments, such as one where schoolchildren sang Guyanese patriotic songs. The channel at the time also lacked efficient methods of contacting, such as a lack of website and phone number.

=== Quality of local programming ===
On the night of 24 September 2014, a program about maths was criticized in a letter to Stabroek News where the teacher used a flip chart which, according to the complaint, failed to convey its subject matter effectively.

=== Swearing controversy ===
The channel was put into hot water by Guyanese netizens on 12 October 2020, after airing a video called "English Abbreviations", in which the swear word fuck (as in the expression "what the fuck") was repeated eight times. The channel apologized for the airing of the video and an investigation was launched.

== Programming ==
Note: This list only contains foreign series and not local programming.

=== GLC Digital & Analog ===
- Bill Nye
- Bluey
- Blue's Clues
- Brain Games
- Brainchild
- Daniel Tiger's Neighborhood (BBC)
- Cosmos: A Spacetime Odyssey
- Cyberchase
- Little Einsteins
- Mister Rogers' Neighborhood
- MythBusters
- Octonauts
- Sesame Street
- Sid the Science Kid
- Stillwater
- Super Why!
- The Magic School Bus
- Wild Kratts
- Xavier Riddle and the Secret Museum

=== GLC Analog only ===
- Arthur
- Astroblast!
- Blaze and the Monster Machines
- Crawford the Cat
- Curious George (1982 TV series)
- Grossology
- Schoolhouse Rock!
- Team Umizoomi
- The Magic School Bus Rides Again
- WordWorld
