= Television Guyana =

Guyanese television network

- Country: Guyana
- Broadcast area: National
- Headquarters: Georgetown

Programming
- Language: English
- Picture format: 480i (NTSC)

Ownership
- Owner: Ramroop Group of Companies

History
- Launched: May 1980
- Replaced: VCT Network

Links
- Website: https://guyanatimesgy.com/

Availability

Terrestrial
- UHF: Channel 28 (Georgetown)
- VHF: Channel 12 (Berbice)

Television Guyana, also known as TVG, is a Guyanese over-the-air television network owned by the Ramroop Group of Companies, led by Dr. Ranjisinghi 'Bobby' Ramroop, the owner of Guyana Times and Radio Guyana. It is the oldest television channel in the country, descending from the former Vieira Communications Television.

The station broadcasts on UHF channel 28, with additional relay stations outside the capital on channels 12 (Berbice), 25 and 35.

== History ==
=== Vieira Communications Television ===
Vieira Communications Television started broadcasting in May 1980 under the initiative of Anthony Vieira, becoming the first television station in the country. Shortly before, the first television sets and video recorders were made available in Guyana in upper and middle class households. VCT had its transmitter located in Versailles on the west bank of the Demerara River. Initially, VCT delivered its signals by relaying American satellite television programs and later scramble the signal, selling it for a monthly fee, for which a descrambler was required. Only the elites bought descramblers, as the cost of such was high. The station broadcast on UHF channel 28 and at start it had a limited schedule, relaying popular American television series of the time such as Dallas, Charlie’s Angels, Diff'rent Strokes, The Jeffersons and The Love Boat among others. The legality of VCT led to debates on the subject, over times, writers to Stabroek News' letter column described it as a "pirate" station. Until the appearance of WRHM, it was the only television station in Guyana; WRHM when it opened was entirely free-to-air and did not rely on subscriptions.

In 1993, The Evening News premiered, airing weeknights at 7pm. During this period, the station was identified under the 8RVTV callsign. In 1998, it was reported that the station suffered technical interference from CNS TV 6.

VCT announced the end of its evening news bulletin on 1 April 1999, set to end by late June, due to lack of advertiser support. The newscast later continued due to circumstances beyond Vieira's control and viewer feedback. The bulletin was suspended in April 2000 for a one-month period, due to a rift between Vieira and VCT staff members over story payments. The aim of the suspension was to improve the quality of the newscast when it returned.

The lottery broadcasts moved to NCN Television who accepted a more attractive offer from the lottery board. This led to the beginning of VCT's downfall. After these events, Vieira lost control of the channel in 2007 after TBN shut down its operations in Guyana being sold to Hits and Jams TV, a private channel. The end of his relays of TBN negatively impacted its income.

In early 2009, VCT temporarily suspended 24-hour broadcasts due to electricity costs.

TVG faced a loss of licence in April 2016, as it had failed to submit its financial records to the GNBA's board.

=== Television Guyana ===
On 5 June 2009, Vieira, age 64, sold off VCT Network to the Ramroop Group, who launched The Guyana Times in 2008. The founder of the channel wanted to concentrate on "less stressful" assets he still had. VCT was being affected by the 2008 financial crisis and the state of the local advertising market, which for such a small population was being served by a large number of television channels. Unnamed Ramroop officials were expecting the channel to have a large makeover, with “new and exciting programs to Guyanese as they seek to enhance the quality of local television viewing”. The name VCT was in the process of being scrapped.

== Controversies ==
=== 2002 suspension of staff member ===
In May 2002, a member of the VCT Network staff was suspended from working at the channel for a period of one month, due to the airing of the Andrew Douglas tape. At the time, there were no guidelines set for the tape being considered "illegal".

=== Criticism of ethnic domination of South Asians and Afro-Guyanese ===
Anthony Vieira made critical remarks of other ethnic minorities in Guyana, specifically the African and Indian communities that dominated the country, in the third week of May 2004. The Advisory Committee on Broadcasting (ACB) in June demanded the suspension of VCT Network's license due to three related episodes. Vieira denied rumors of a possible closure of the station.
