= One Communications Guyana =

One Communications Guyana (formerly Guyana Telephone and Telegraph Company)
- Type: Subsidiary
- Industry: Telecommunications
- Founded: 1991; 35 years ago
- Headquarters: 4th Floor, Pegasus Corporate Suites, Kingston, Georgetown, Guyana
- Key people: Damian Blackburn (CEO)
- Products: Wireless; Telephone; Internet
- Owner: Atlantic Tele-Network (80%); Government of Guyana (20%)
- Number of employees: 700
- Website: One Communications

One Communications Guyana (formerly Guyana Telephone and Telegraph Company and Guyana Telecommunications Corporation) is a fixed local exchange carrier (LEC), wireless network operator and Internet service provider based in Guyana, South America. It is the largest provider of telecommunication services in Guyana with a subscriber base exceeding 300,000 in a country with a population of about 700,000. Its parent company is the Atlantic Tele-Network.

== Guyana Telecommunications Corporation ==
The Guyana Telecommunications Corporation (GTC) was the state-owned telecommunications provider in Guyana prior to the liberalisation and privatisation reforms of the 1990s. It played a central role in the development of national telephone and telegraph infrastructure during the post-independence and pre-privatisation era.

== Services ==
Initially GTT’s focus was on the provision of local fixed line, long-distance and international voice calls. Notably, its primary source of revenue came from premium rate numbers dialled from the United States, of which estimates of between 35% and 90% were for phone sex lines. These services are used today, however not as extensively as before.

GTT has expanded its residential portfolio services to include DSL, Blaze, fixed LTE, mobile services and roaming.

The company has an application through which customers can pay their bills, view payment history and top up their mobile accounts. smsbot and chatbot are mediums through which customers can interact with GTT representatives and MMG services.

International voice traffic is carried for GTT by Verizon, EssexTel, Telesur, BDS (Lime), IDT, TATA, TSTT, Telco-214, AT&T while international collect calling is provided through agreements with Verizon, TSTT and AT&T. The Earth Station in Thomas Lands which previously received and relayed international voice and data traffic is now utilized for domestic traffic.

GTT constructed Guyana’s first submarine fibre optic cable which was launched under the brand name “emagine” in the early 2000s.

GTT publishes the Guyana Telephone Directory.

GTT has developed a smart phone mobile payment system.

== Structure ==
Many of the main offices are located in Georgetown, Guyana. The corporate headquarters campus is divided into the Telephone House which houses the commercial headquarters of the company as well as customer service call centers and the operator service center. The Executive Suite, which has its own entrance, parking and security houses, the office space of key employees and executives. The Human Resources offices have a separate building. The Residential Service Unit, houses the residential and government services offices and the collections office. The Central Telegraph Office houses telegram and telegraph services, accounting and finance departments and the office of the Director of Customer Services. The Technical Headquarters in the Thomas Lands area also houses the International Earth Station.

== Competitors ==
One Communications main competitors are Jamaican-based Digicel, headquartered in Kingston, Jamaica. and most recently, ENet (formerly E-Networks) headquartered in Georgetown (Guyana's only locally owned telecommunications network) brought competition to the market.
