= NCN Television (Guyana) =

National Communications Network
- Country: Guyana
- Broadcast area: National
- Headquarters: Georgetown

Programming
- Language: English
- Picture format: 480i 1080p (NTSC and ATSC)

Ownership
- Owner: National Communications Network, Guyana
- Sister channels: NCN Sports

History
- Launched: 1 January 1988
- Former names: Guyana Television (1988–2004); GTV 10 (1988–1996); GTV 11 (1996–2004)

Links
- Website: https://ncnguyana.com/2023/

Availability

Terrestrial
- UHF: Analog VHF 11, Digital 1-2

NCN Television is the television service of the National Communications Network, Guyana. Created in 1988 as an independent government outlet, it was merged with GBC in 2004 and became a part of the current NCN.

== History ==
The government already had plans to enter television in 1985, when the Guyana Film Center changed from film to video. The unit was subsequently renamed Visual Production Center in February 1989.

NCN TV's predecessor, Guyana Television Company, was licensed in October 1987, going on air on 1 January 1988, broadcasting an experimental service for an hour a week on Sundays using a 400-watt transmitter donated by the Canadian Broadcasting Corporation on VHF channel 10. A merger of the three government media units was set for late March 1992.

An assessment taken by the National Frequency Management Unit in 1992 said that GTV was the only television station in Guyana to comply with technical and programming requirements. On 1 April 1993, GTV was put under the control of a newly-established government company, the Guyana Television Broadcasting Company.

In 1996, with the release of an official VHF frequency plan for Georgetown by the NFMU, GTV planned to move to channel 11, a decision pending approval of the Broadcast Authority Bill. The station's executive chairman Earl Bousquet said that the move in frequencies was to prevent co-channel interference, as Neil Blackman's NBTV (now known as HBTV) occupied channel 9. In January 1998, GTV ordered two translators and one transmitter from Acrodyne, aiming to increase its coverage beyond Georgetown and covering 70% of the national population. On 14 December 2000, GTV suspended its news operation (The Six O'Clock News) due to unpaid bonuses to its staff. Its suspension was temporarily filled with parliament sittings and a rebroadcast of a news bulletin from BBC World.

On 1 March 2004, GTV and GBC merged to become NCN. In 2006, it took over the lottery broadcasts that formerly aired on VCT Network, strengthening its position in the market.

By 2013, NCN started its conversion to digital technologies. Allan La Rose's Real Sports Vybz program premiered on 28 September 2015, about the then-upcoming election of the Guyana Football Federation. A national uplink facility entered operation in March 2016, ending a five-year contract with Television Guyana, becoming in charge of the national satellite relay of the Guyana Learning Channel. This enabled NCN Television to have nationwide coverage, especially because of the ongoing territorial dispute with Venezuela.

NCN held the rights to the 2018 FIFA World Cup.

As of December 2024, 80% of its television infrastructure was digital-ready.

== Criticism ==
A letter to the Stabroek News criticized the fact that NCN Television had copyright rights protection for the 2014 FIFA World Cup but refused to do the same for Guyanese musicians, whose appearances on the channel were not paid.

=== Allegations of political bias towards the ruling party ===
NCN Television has been accused by locals as being a biased broadcaster favoring the ruling party. In January 2020, the channel aired party political broadcasts in favor of APNU+AFC.
