= Tuenti Argentina =

Argentina communications company

Tuenti
- Formerly: Quam (2013-2014); Movistar Argentina (2014-2026)
- Type: Subsidiary
- Founded: 18 November 2014; 11 years ago; October 19, 2026 (as an independent brand)
- Headquarters: Chacabuco 271, Buenos Aires, Argentina
- Area served: Argentina
- Key people: Sebastián Bardengo (CEO of Metrotel)
- Products: high speed internet, cable internet, fiber-optic internet, mobile telephony
- Parent: Telefónica Argentina (2014–2026); Telecom Argentina (2026); Metrotel Argentina (2026-present)
- Website: www.tuenti.com.ar

Tuenti is an Argentine telecommunications company which provides Internet and mobile telephony services throughout the country. A subsidiary of Metrotel Argentina, it started as a mobile service provider from its foundation in 2014. It consolidated its position as the third largest mobile operator in Argentina, taking the place of Movistar after Telefónica left the country.

== History ==
Tuenti was originally launched as a social network in late 2006 by Zaryn Dentzel, Félix Ruiz, Joaquín Ayuso, Kenny Bentley, and Adeyemi Ajao. Dentzel first encountered Spain through an exchange program that took him to Cabeza del Buey (Badajoz), and years later, Tuenti was born out of this experience.

As of November 6, 2013, the Telefónica Group owned 100% of the Tuenti brand, following an agreement reached by the parties to finalize the acquisition of the remaining capital previously held by minority shareholders—that the company did not yet own.

On November 18, 2014, Tuenti was launched in Argentina as a mobile operator, replacing the Telefónica Group’s "Quam" brand. It operates under the umbrella of Movistar, and as a new feature, alongside the rebranding users were given access to the Tuenti app to monitor and manage their services.

=== Acquisition in 2026 ===
In 2025, it was acquired by Telecom Argentina following the latter’s purchase of the entirety of Telefónica Argentina and subsequently transferred to Metrotel in compliance with divestment mandates imposed by the Argentine government as a condition for approving the acquisition of Telefónica Argentina. It is set to begin operations as an independent mobile carrier in mid-October 2026.

While a large portion of Movistar’s customer base will automatically migrate to Tuenti, not all customers will be transferred; Telecom will retain a segment of the subscriber portfolio. Individual notifications will be sent out progressively to approximately 6 million mobile lines and 200,000 fixed-internet accounts between October 19 and the end of November 2026.
