= Movistar Argentina =

Argentina communications company

Movistar
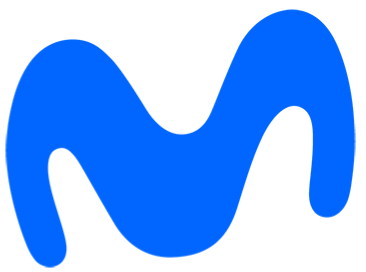

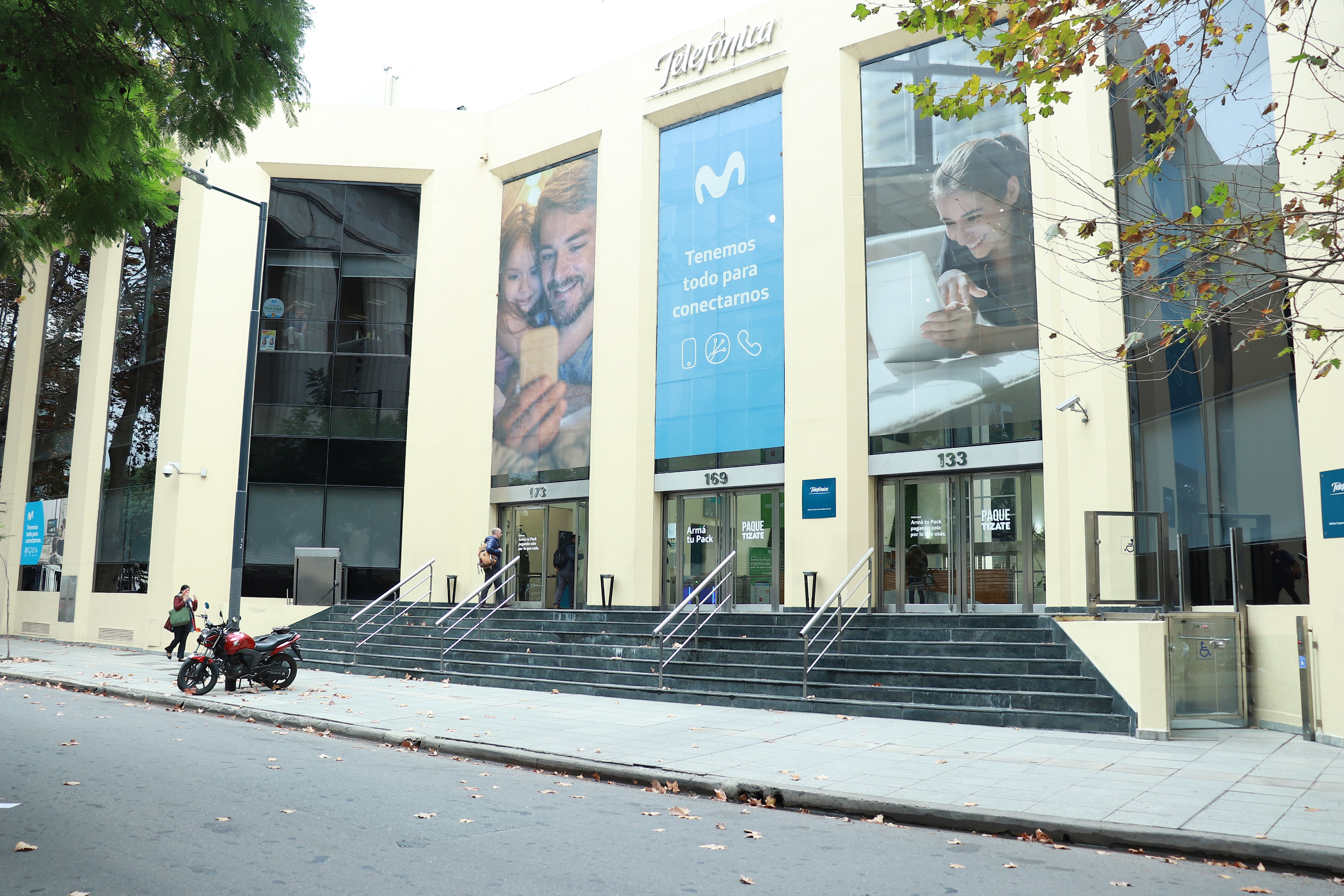
- Formerly: Telefónica Unifón (2000-2005); Miniphone (1993-1999)
- Type: Subsidiary
- Founded: 23 April 1993; 33 years ago
- Headquarters: Avenida Corrientes 707, Buenos Aires, Argentina
- Area served: Argentina
- Products: high speed internet, cable internet, fiber-optic internet, mobile telephony
- Parent: Telefónica Argentina
- Website: movistar.com.ar

Movistar Argentina is an Argentine telecommunications company, a subsidiary of Telefónica Group. It previously operated under the trade name “Miniphone”, then as “Unifón”, and after merging with “Movicom BellSouth” in 2005, it began to be called Movistar, adopting the Spanish brand.

== History ==
Previous logo, used from 2020 until 2025.

From 1993 to 1999, the company provided services under the Miniphone brand in the Buenos Aires Metropolitan Area (AMBA) in conjunction with Telecom Argentina. Since then, and due to regulatory provisions, the company was divided among its shareholders, and both Telefónica Argentina and Telecom Argentina have provided services independently, using the brands Telefónica Unifón and Telecom Personal, respectively.

The Unifón brand was used until 2005, when Telefónica S.A. bought BellSouth's cellular networks in Latin America; resulting in the merger between Unifón and Movicom, and the change of trade name to Movistar, as well as the unification of the trade name at a continental level.

During 2005, the company had more than 3100 employees and invested more than 450 million pesos, mostly allocated to the deployment of the GSM network, especially in the installation of equipment and expansion of service platforms.

At the beginning of 2012, Movistar had 16.7 million customers, placing it in third position among mobile phone operators in Argentina, behind Claro Argentina and Telecom Personal.

=== Sale in 2025 ===
On February 24, 2025, Telefónica Hispanoamérica reached an agreement with Telecom Argentina to sell all of its shares in Telefónica Argentina. The transaction is valued at US$1.245 billion.

Likewise, since the approval of the purchase is still being disputed by the Argentine government, it was revealed in September 2025 that Telecom Argentina is in negotiations with Telefónica to extend the use of its brands in Argentina, mainly Movistar.

== Movistar TV ==
In October 2018, Movistar began offering fiber optic TV service following the reforms implemented by Mauricio Macri's government that allowed telephone companies and pay-TV operators to offer telephone and cable or satellite services, which had previously been prohibited.

After the Telefónica-Movistar-Speedy merger, Movistar became the main provider of all services. Following this merger, Movistar launched 300 Mbps fiber-to-the-home plans, as well as a symmetrical 300 Mbps plan, and a 100 Mbps plan. This effectively discontinued the 20 Mbps and 50 Mbps plans that were available when the service was still called Speedy.

== Incidents ==
On April 2, 2012, millions of Movistar users experienced service interruptions throughout the day, losing signal on their phones. According to the company, the problem may have originated in the antenna control software. This prevented phones from correctly identifying themselves on the cellular network. As a result of these problems, the National Communications Commission ordered Telefónica de Argentina to restore service immediately, and threatened severe penalties under existing legislation if the issue was not resolved.

On July 14, 2017, call and text message service was interrupted in the provinces of Neuquén, Mendoza, and Río Negro. The company reported via Twitter that it was a widespread problem in the area and that they were working to resolve it. No compensation was offered to customers.

== Logos ==
2016-2020

2020-2025

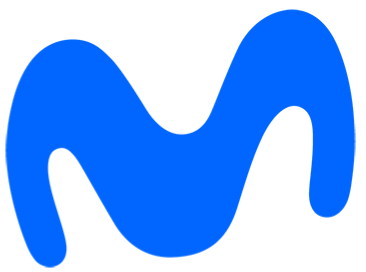
From 2025
