= K2view =

Data integration company

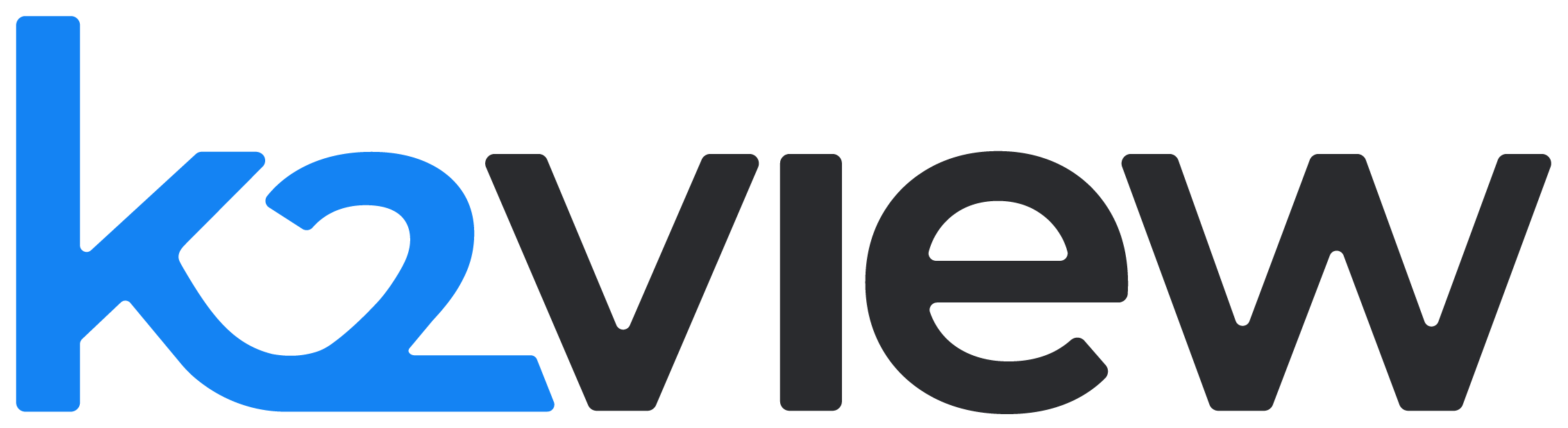
- Type: Private
- Industry: Software, Data Management, Data Integration, Test Data Management
- Founded: 2009
- Founder: Achi Rotem and Rafi Cohen
- Headquarters: Yokneam, Israel
- Key people: Steve Kostyshen (CEO); Achi Rotem (President); F. Thaddeus Arroyo (Chairman)
- Products: Data Product Platform, AI Data Fusion, Synthetic Data Management, Test Data Management, Enterprise Data Masking
- Number of employees: 150
- Website: www.k2view.com

K2view Ltd. is an enterprise software company that develops a data product platform for enterprise data integration, data preparation, and data delivery. Its software is used for applications including AI data provisioning, test data management, synthetic data generation, data masking, and data migration.

In 2025, Gartner positioned K2view as a Visionary in its Magic Quadrant for Data Integration Tools.

== History ==
K2view was founded in 2009 by Achi Rotem and Rafi Cohen, both former executives of global telecommunications technology companies Amdocs, Sprint-Nextel, and TTI, and named after K2, the second-highest mountain on Earth and one of the hardest to climb.

During the 2010s, K2view was the data migration platform for several global telecommunications M&A and transformation projects. These included the Telefónica Argentina transformation by Amdocs in 2012, AT&T's acquisitions of DIRECTV in 2014, Iusacell in 2015, and Nextel Mexico in 2015, the Kcell JSC transformation by Amdocs in 2015, the Liberty Global–Vodafone merger in 2016, and the Entel Chile transformation by Ericsson in 2017.

K2view was granted US patents for its Cloud Database Management System (CDBMS) in 2019, and for its Encryption Directed Database Management System and method in 2020.

In 2020, the company raised US$28M in first-round financing led by Forestay Capital and with the participation of Genesis Partners. It also launched its Data Fabric product for real-time data integration, governance, and delivery and announced further operational enhancements in 2021.

In 2022, it launched its cloud-based Data Product Platform and was positioned as the Leader in the SPARK Matrix Data Integration Tools.

In 2023, the company released its AI-powered synthetic data generation service and Ronen Schwartz was appointed CEO.

Since 2023, K2view has been ranked a Visionary in the Gartner Magic Quadrant for Data Integration Tools.

In 2023 and 2024, K2view was a Leader in the SPARK Matrix for Data Masking Tools, and 1 of the 10 Best Data Integration Companies by CIOCoverage.

In 2024, K2view introduced its AI Data Fusion product, enhancing Generative AI frameworks by integrating structured enterprise data into Large Language Models like OpenAI ChatGPT and Google Gemini. In 2024 and 2025, QKS Group positioned K2view as a Leader in the SPARK Matrix for Data Integration Tools and recognized it as a Leader in the SPARK Matrix: Enterprise Data Fabric, respectively.

In 2025, Israel Hayom included K2view in a list of Israeli startups featured for their growth prospects. The company was selected for Walmart Global Tech's Sparkcubate startup collaboration program in 2025. The company also launched its Data Agent Builder, a no-code tool for developing agentic AI applications.

In 2025, K2view and Medoid AI received a gold award at the AI & Data Awards in the "Best Use of AI/Data for Development and Testing" category for Reality Engine: Next-Gen Synthetic Data Generation with Tabular Language Models. Later that year, it secured $15 million in growth capital to support product development and business expansion.

In 2026, K2view introduced AI Context Optimizer and announced a partnership with Rocket Software for mainframe modernization. In the same year, Steve Kostyshen became CEO, while F. Thaddeus Arroyo, former CEO of AT&T Consumer, was appointed chairman of the board.

== Activities ==
K2view is a privately held company with offices in Yokneam and Raanana in Israel, Plano, TX in the US, Maastricht in the Netherlands, and Düsseldorf in Germany.

Its customers include Verizon, Walmart, Charles Schwab, KeyBank, Vodafone, and Telefónica.

K2view focuses on regulated industries like banking, insurance, telecom, healthcare, and, retail.
