= Flow (Argentina) =

Argentine cable and internet provider

- Company type: S.A.
- Industry: Telecommunications; Mass media
- Founded: 29 August 1981
- Headquarters: Buenos Aires, Argentina
- Area served: Argentina, Paraguay, Uruguay
- Key people: Carlos Alberto Moltini (CEO)
- Services: Cable; Internet
- Revenue: ▲$2.280 billion USD (2014)
- Net income: ▲$332.44 million USD (2014)
- Number of employees: 9065 (2014)
- Parent: DF Entertainment (2021-present); Telecom (2021-present)
- Website: flow.com.ar

Flow is an Argentine company that provided cable television and internet services in Argentina, Paraguay and Uruguay, as of 2021 integrated into DF Entertainment and Telecom Argentina S.A.

As part of an internal reorganisation, in October 2021 Telecom dissolved Cablevisión, focusing on the brands Telecom, Personal, and Flow. The company kept all the services provided under the former brand names "Cablevisión" and "Fibertel".

== History ==
The company was founded in 1981, initially offering service in La Lucila, Buenos Aires.

In 1983, it expanded to the cities of Vicente Lopez and San Isidro. Afterwards, the neighborhoods of Belgrano, Palermo and Recoleta in Buenos Aires were added under the supervision of businessman Eduardo Eurnekian under the America media conglomerate.

In 1994, Tele-Communications International Inc. acquired a 51% stake in the company, as well as the PRAMER cable production system.

In 1997, Citicorp Equity Investment (CEI) and Telefónica Internacional were incorporated as shareholders.

Between 1997 and 1998, Cablevisión became one of the major cable operators in the city of Buenos Aires and Greater Buenos Aires. In 1998, it was offering its services in 7 provinces.

In 2006, conglomerate Clarín Group bought 60% of Cablevisión, merging it with Multicanal, the second biggest Argentine pay TV operator, forming one of the biggest cable companies in the world.

In 2017, Cablevisión merged with Telecom Argentina, becoming the largest telecommunication company of Argentina. In October 2021, Telecom announced that Cablevisión would cease operations, keeping the internet access and cable television under the "Flow" brand.
