= Union of the Democratic Centre (Argentina) =

Political party in Argentina

Union of the Democratic Centre Unión del Centro Democrático
- Abbreviation: UCD, UCeDé
- President: Andrés Passamonti
- Secretary-General: Luis Cendra
- Founder: Álvaro Alsogaray
- Founded: August 1982; 43 years ago
- Headquarters: Buenos Aires
- Youth wing: Juventud UCeDé
- Membership (2017): ▼18,390
- Ideology: Conservatism; Economic liberalism
- Political position: Centre-right to right-wing
- Colours: Blue, white
- Chamber of Deputies: 0 / 257
- Senate: 0 / 72
- Buenos Aires Legislature: 0 / 60

Party flag
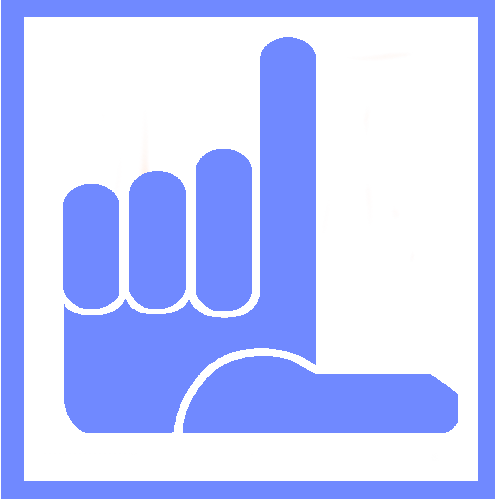

Website
- ucede.ar

The Union of the Democratic Centre (Spanish: Unión del Centro Democrático, UCD or UCeDé) is a centre-right to right-wing conservative and economically liberal political party in Argentina. It was founded in 1982 by Álvaro Alsogaray who unsuccessfully ran in the 1983 and 1989 presidential elections, and represented the conservative elite, technocrats, and classical liberals.

As of October 2020 the party doesn't count with legal recognition nationwide.

== History ==
The leader of the party, Álvaro Alsogaray, was a national deputy for the City of Buenos Aires for sixteen consecutive years, between 1983 and 1999. In 1983 and 1989 he was a candidate for the presidency, and then appointed ad hoc presidential advisor to Carlos Menem.

By 1989, the UceDé had emerged as the third political force nationwide, after the traditional major parties: the Justicialist Party (PJ) and the Radical Civic Union (UCR). Carlos Menem, an exponent of the growing pro-market wing within the formerly Peronist PJ, won the election of 1989. UCeDé concluded an alliance with the Justicialist-led administration which had only a narrow majority in the Chamber of Deputies and gave important support to its policies of privatization and liberal economic reforms. Alsogaray, who had been an opponent of traditional Peronism, became the administration's chief policy advisor and his daughter María Julia secretary of natural resources and the main responsible for the privatization of the public telecommunications company ENTel. In the subsequent presidential election, the UCeDé endorsed Carlos Menem.

In 2007, UCeDe participated in the Union PRO centre-right alliance to dispute the governorship of the province of Buenos Aires, supporting the opposition formula Francisco de Narváez-Jorge Macri. Union PRO finished in third place, with 14.96% of the votes. The coalition would also last for the 2009 legislative elections, where the party also supported the candidacy of Francisco de Narváez as national deputy. Narvaez was 34% winner, beating former President Nestor Kirchner.

In 2011, he participated in the Federal Commitment Alliance supporting the presidential formula Alberto Rodríguez Saá-José María Vernet.

In March 2015, the UCeDé of the City of Buenos Aires established an electoral alliance with the Republican Proposal (PRO) and supported Horacio Rodríguez Larreta for Head of Government in the election of that same year. Later, the UCeDé of the Province of Buenos Aires decided to join the Cambiemos alliance and supported María Eugenia Vidal for Governor of Buenos Aires in the election of that same year. For many years, UCeDé supported the center-right Peronist, José Manuel de la Sota in the Province of Córdoba, but in 2015 he joined Juntos by Córdoba and won second place led by the radical Oscar Aguad.

For the 2019 presidential elections, he managed to reshape 5 districts necessary to obtain national status and decided to join the Frente Despertar, led by economist José Luis Espert, who finished in the last position with 1.5% of the votes.

== Electoral performance ==
=== President ===
Election year	Candidate	Coalition	1st round		2nd round		Result
Election year	Candidate	Coalition	# of overall votes	% of overall vote	# of overall votes	% of overall vote	Result
1983	Álvaro Alsogaray	National Centre Confederation	60,271 (7th)	0.40	—N/a		✗ Defeated
1989	Álvaro Alsogaray	Centre Alliance	1,093,398 (3rd)	23.04	—N/a		✗ Defeated
1995	Carlos Menem	—N/a	456,594 (Note: Number reflects votes cast for the UCeDé list, not the overall votes cast for Carlos Menem.)	2.62	—N/a		✓ 1-R Elected
1999	Eduardo Duhalde	Justicialist Concertation for Change	562,674 (Note: Number reflects votes cast for the UCeDé list, not the overall votes cast for Eduardo Duhalde.)	2.97	—N/a		✗ 1-R Defeated
2003	Carlos Menem	Front for Loyalty	4,741,202 (1st)	24.45	Withdrew candidacy		✗ 1-R Defeated
2007	Alberto Rodríguez Saá	Justice, Unity and Liberty	1,459,174 (4th)	7.64	—N/a		✗ 1-R Defeated
2011	Alberto Rodríguez Saá	Federal Commitment	1,749,971 (4th)	7.80	—N/a		✗ 1-R Defeated
2015	Mauricio Macri	Cambiemos	8,601,063 (2nd)	34.15	12,997,937	51.34	✓ 2-R Elected
2019	José Luis Espert	Frente Despertar	394,206 (6th)	1.47	—N/a		✗ 1-R Defeated
