= María Julia Alsogaray =

Argentine politician and civil servant

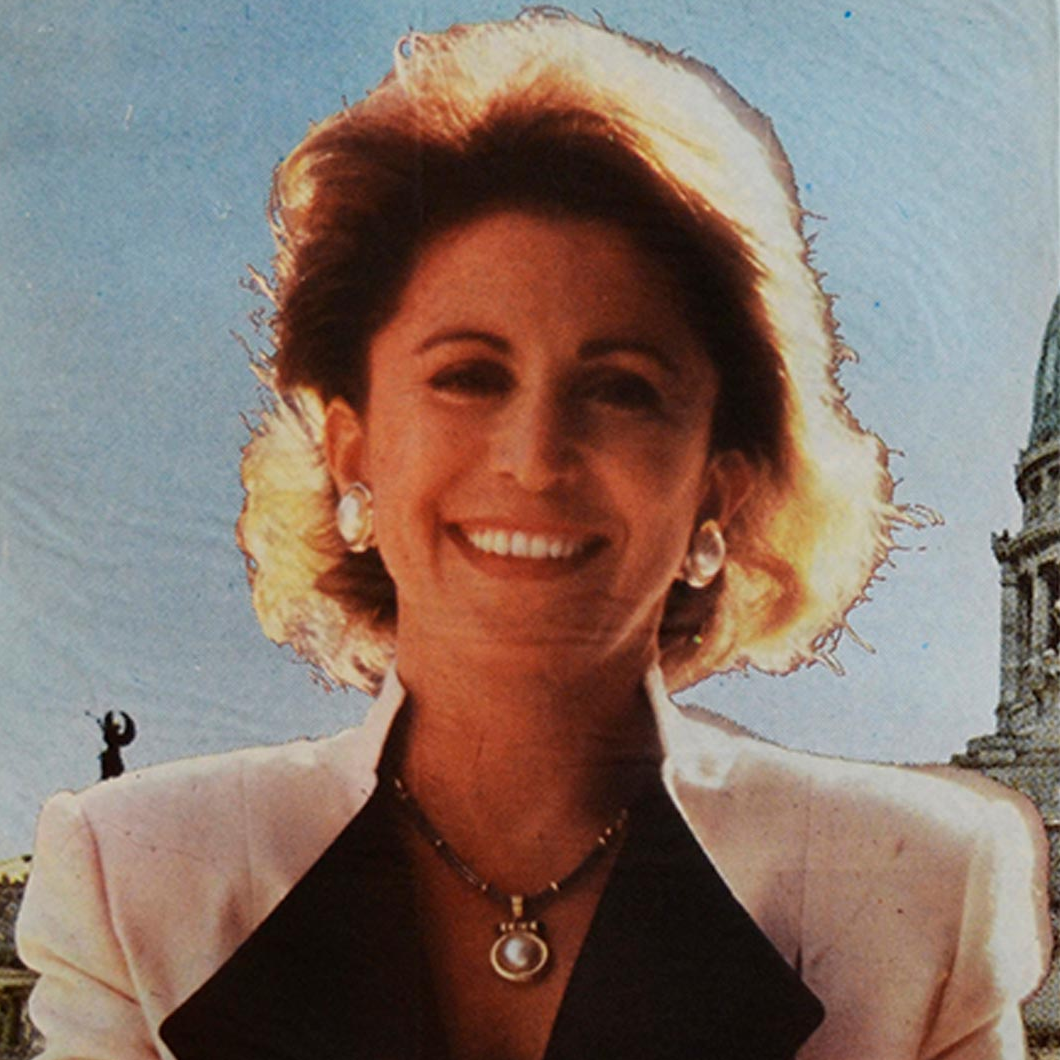
- Alsogaray in 1989

Secretary of Natural Resources and Sustainable Development
- In office November 8, 1991 – December 10, 1999
- President: Carlos Menem
- Preceded by: post created
- Succeeded by: Norberto La Porta

National Deputy
- In office December 10, 1985 – November 8, 1991
- Constituency: City of Buenos Aires

Personal details
- Born: 8 October 1942 Buenos Aires
- Died: 24 September 2017 (aged 74) Buenos Aires
- Party: Union of the Democratic Centre
- Spouse: Francisco Erize
- Education: Catholic University of Argentina
- Profession: Engineer

María Julia Alsogaray (October 8, 1942 – September 24, 2017) was an Argentine politician and engineer convicted in 2004 for financial crimes against the state.

== Biography ==
The second of three children of socialite Edith Gay and conservative politician Álvaro Alsogaray, she was born in Buenos Aires and earned a degree in engineering at the Catholic University of Argentina in 1969. She was elected to Congress in 1985 on her father's ticket, the Union of the Democratic Centre (UCeDé), and became an outspoken defender of free markets during the presidency of Raúl Alfonsín. She married Francisco Erize, and had two sons: Alvaro Erize and Francisco Erize.

The UCeDé became a close ally of Justicialist Party nominee Carlos Menem after the 1989 election (in which Menem ran as a populist), and Alsogaray was appointed to head the privatizations of the ENTel state phone company in 1990 and of the Somisa state steel works in 1991. This post earned Alsogaray disapproval when reports emerged that ENTel land valued at US$180 million was gifted to its buyers; and later, when Somisa was sold to Techint in 1992 for US$152 million - one seventh the book value Jorge Triaca, her predecessor at Somisa, had estimated.

Her personal life also attracted controversy following a July 1990 photoshoot for Noticias, Argentina's leading news magazine. The suggestive photo spread (in which she appeared wearing a fur coat that implied that she was nude under the coat) was accompanied by an interview in which her relationship with the recently divorced president Menem was discussed (Alsogaray was also in the process of divorcing). Alsogaray was appointed Secretary of Natural Resources and Sustainable Development (environment) in November 1991, something she attributed in a Clarín interview at the time to the "trust the President has deposited in me." Her own position within the right-wing UCeDé, at the helm of which she succeeded her father in 1994, became jeopardized by a rivalry with the party's second-ranking figure, National Mortgage Bank Director Adelina D'Alessio de Viola.

Alsogaray's tenure at Environment Secretariat, which was elevated to a cabinet-level post by the president, was marked by a number of scandals of a policy nature. These included bid rigging for the refurbishment of the Haedo Palace (the headquarters of the secretariat); her handling of a serious, 1996 forest fire in the vicinity of Nahuel Huapi National Park; a 1999 flood in the humid northeast region; and, particularly, of a 1993 plan to decontaminate the Riachuelo (a heavily polluted waterway along Buenos Aires' industrial southside). She had promised in a speech in January 1993 that it would be cleaned "in a thousand days", in addition to assuring that she would "go swimming" in it, which as of 2026 remains contaminated. Alsogaray obtained a US$250 million loan from the IADB for the purpose; of this, however, US$150 million were destined to unrelated social projects, six million were lost in IADB fines, US$90 million remained unallocated, and only one million was used for the actual cleanup.

Upon stepping down when President Menem left office in 1999, financial transactions in her name totaling over US$200 million came under scrutiny, and Alsogaray was ultimately convicted of misappropriation of public funds in 2004. She was sentenced to three years in prison the following May and served 21 months, thus becoming the only Menem administration official to serve time in prison.

Following a number of appeals and pursuant to her conviction, her Recoleta neighborhood townhouse was auctioned by a federal court in 2009. She faced additional charges related to the Environment Ministry's handling of the 1996 forest fires, but was acquitted when the statute of limitations expired on these in April 2013.

Alsogaray served a further two years in house arrest between 2014 and 2016 on charges of illicit enrichment. She faced a further charge - her eighth - of awarding an illegitimate contract worth US$30 million in 1990 to the Meller Company for ENTel telephone directories when other state agencies advised against doing so.

Her health worsened, however, and she died of pancreatic cancer in the Los Arcos clinic in Palermo, Buenos Aires, in 2017. She was 74.
