= Communications in Argentina =

Communications in Argentina gives an overview of the postal, telephone, Internet, radio, television, and newspaper services available in Argentina.

== Government and Communication ==
The history of communication in Argentina dates back to 1916. Early Argentinian press outlets participated in writing journals seemingly “objectively”. However, scholars such as Lucía Vincent (2009) noted covert agreements or arrangements between political authorities and communication providers. They disseminated objective information, creating an illusion of “media independence,” but, instead, communication service providers usually responded to prominent political powers. This is, from the beginning, what made communication in Argentina different from English-speaking communication media. As opposed to communication in Argentina, English-speaking countries’ communication is primarily and highly independent. Throughout Peron’s democratic period (1946–1955), media became central to the government's communication strategy. Radio and cinema were used to promote government policies, and television emerged as a new and significant medium.

During the dictatorship (1976–1983), the information was centralized and coordinated propaganda was implemented. Amidst this period, the regime also imposed severe censorship, closed down media organizations, and subjected journalists to repression.

After the return to democracy in 1983, Alfonsín’s government (1983-1989) generally promoted media pluralism and democratic practices, although reforms like the Ley de radiodifusión were not implemented. Government-media interactions, such as interviews, press conferences, and regular communication became more institutionalized. Television's influence grew, and media outlets began to transition from being intermediaries to independent political actors, shaping public debate.

During Carlos Menem’s administration (1989–1999), television and radio played a central role in shaping public perception. Frequent corruption scandals were prominent in media coverage, and television became a powerful tool for influencing public opinion, reinforcing the media's role in the political sphere.

In Néstor Kirchner's administration (2003–2007) and Cristina Fernández de Kirchner’s (2007–2015), the relationship between the government and the media was marked by tension. Néstor Kirchner’s government publicly questioned the media for how they concentrated power and shaped public opinion. The government advocated for media pluralism and democracy, ensuring multiple voices and perspectives could reach the public, rather than leaving communication dominated by a few large outlets. This led to the 2009 Audiovisual Services Law (known in Argentina as Ley de medios), which introduced new regulations for broadcasting but did not resolve the ongoing debates about media roles, pluralism, and public communication.

In the course of Mauricio Macri’s administration (2015-2019), there was a significant growth in digital media platforms. The widespread accessibility of the Internet empowered individuals to produce online content and actively participate in public discourse.

Nowadays, digital media plays a pivotal role in influencing citizens’ perceptions and opinions regarding Argentina's political, economic, and social landscape. There are more than 30 streaming channels in Argentina, Luzu TV, La Misa, and Olga being the most important ones among young adults.

== Postal ==
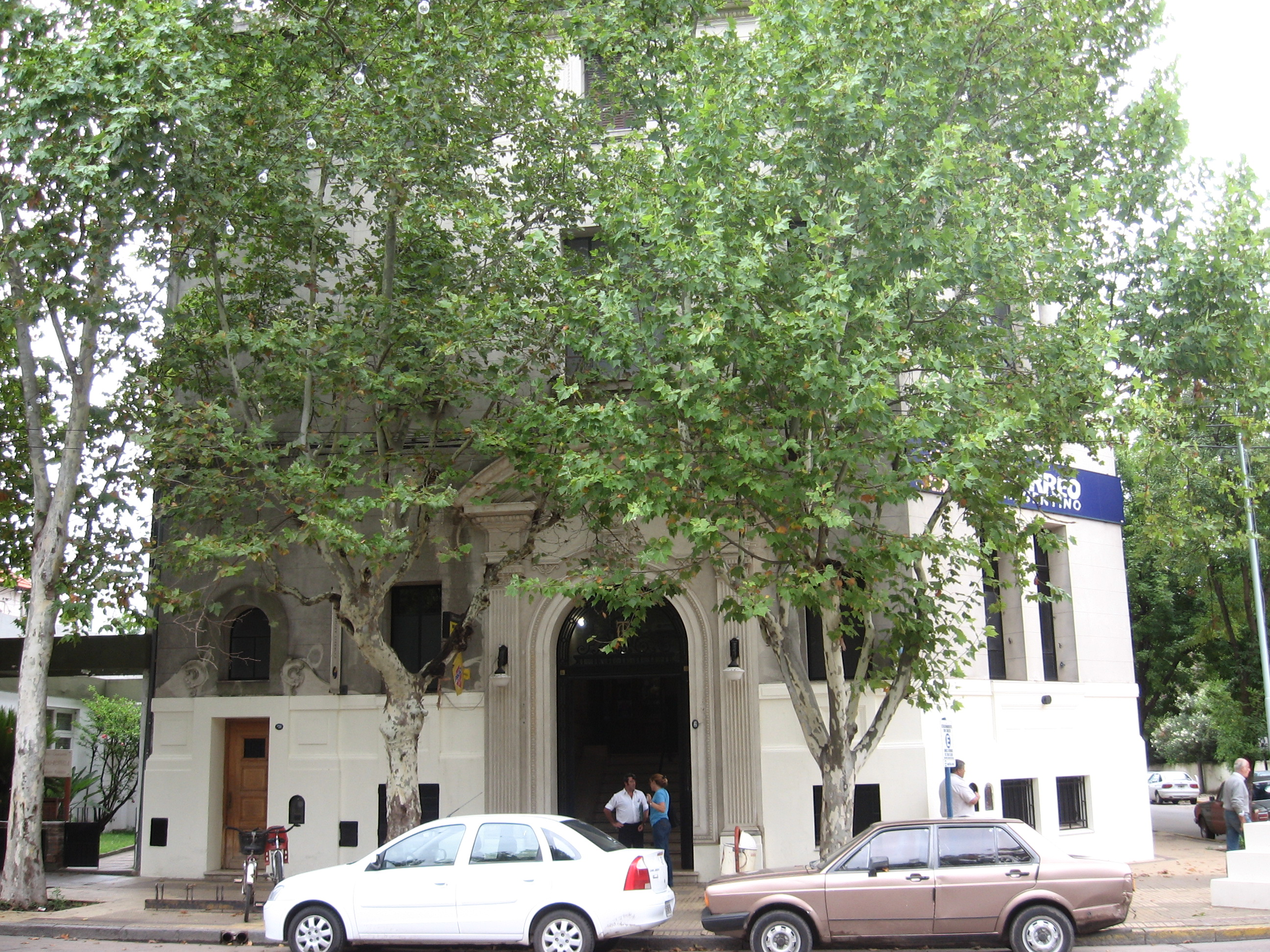
Argentines have access to over 5,000 post offices Nationwide

The national postal service, Correo Argentino, was established in 1826, privatized in 1997, and partly re-nationalized in 2003. There are no standard abbreviations for provinces' names; but the province name is optional and usually not needed if the postal code is correct. The format of the postal code was expanded in 1998 to include more specific information on location within cities; it now uses a letter that identifies the province, a four-digit number, and then three more letters (and slightly different numbers are used for different parts of a city, which was formerly done only in the case of Buenos Aires). See Argentine postal code for details.

== Telephone ==
The network was initially developed primarily by ITT, and grew following the system's nationalization in 1948 and the creation of the ENTel State enterprise. Its limitations notwithstanding, ENTel gave Argentines the widest access to phone service in Latin America. Following ENTel's privatization in 1990, a new numbering plan was enacted, and the number of lines grew to cover the majority of households. A sizable minority of households, do not have land line telephone service, however. The growth of the mobile telephone market since the beginning of the economic recovery in 2003 has been impressive, with new customers now preferring a comparatively cheap cellular phone to land line household service.

As of January 2010, there are 9.2 million land lines, 50 million cellular phones and 143,000 public phones in the country. The domestic telephone trunk network is served by microwave radio relay and a domestic satellite system with 40 earth stations. It carries a monthly traffic of about 1.3 billion local calls, 400 million inter-city calls and around 24 million outgoing international calls.

International communications employ satellite earth stations - 3 Intelsat (Atlantic Ocean); two international gateways near Buenos Aires; Atlantis II submarine cable (1999). This system is largely replaced with a domestic fiber optic ring connecting the main cities (actually the main central offices). This link runs at 2.5 Gbit/s. From these head central offices, local calls are routed through 10 Gbit/s fiber optic links, or 3 × 155 Mbit/s microwave links. These links are spaced at about 30 km. Some of these links (the ones serving smaller towns) are spaced at 60 km and this makes communications unreliable in certain weather conditions.

According to a report released in January 2006 by INDEC, mobile phone lines increased by 68.8% during 2005. Eleven million mobile phones were sold that year and, by then, these serviced three-quarters of the population over 14. A growing minority of users are children under 14, something that has raised concern and debate in Argentine society. A private study conducted by Investigaciones Económicas Sectoriales (IES), covering January–October 2006, found a 51.2% growth compared to the same period of 2005; by December 2007, the number of these units (40 million) exceeded Argentina's total population. Most of the phones (almost 90%) are imported from Brazil or Mexico. The monthly volume of calls made with these units (over 4.6 billion) more than doubles the number made on land lines; a further 6 billion text messages are sent, monthly.

=== Companies ===
In the 1990s the Argentine telephone system (which was formerly property of a state-owned company, ENTEL) was sold to two private corporations looking to invest in the local market: Telefónica, a telco from Spain, and Telecom Argentina, owned by Telecom Italia and the Argentine Werthein family. The country was divided in two zones, within which one of the companies was the exclusive provider of the service (a state-sanctioned monopoly).

The service was then deregulated in several steps, first allowing the participation of other companies to provide international phone call services, then mobile services and finally the domestic service.

Telecom has a subsidiary Internet service provider, Arnet. Other ISPs, such as Flash (property of the Clarín group), hire the facilities of Telecom and Telefónica.

Several newcomer companies in the telephone market (2005) offer high-speed broadband access, Voice over IP and other services to a restricted market group (businesses and high-level residential users).

== Internet ==
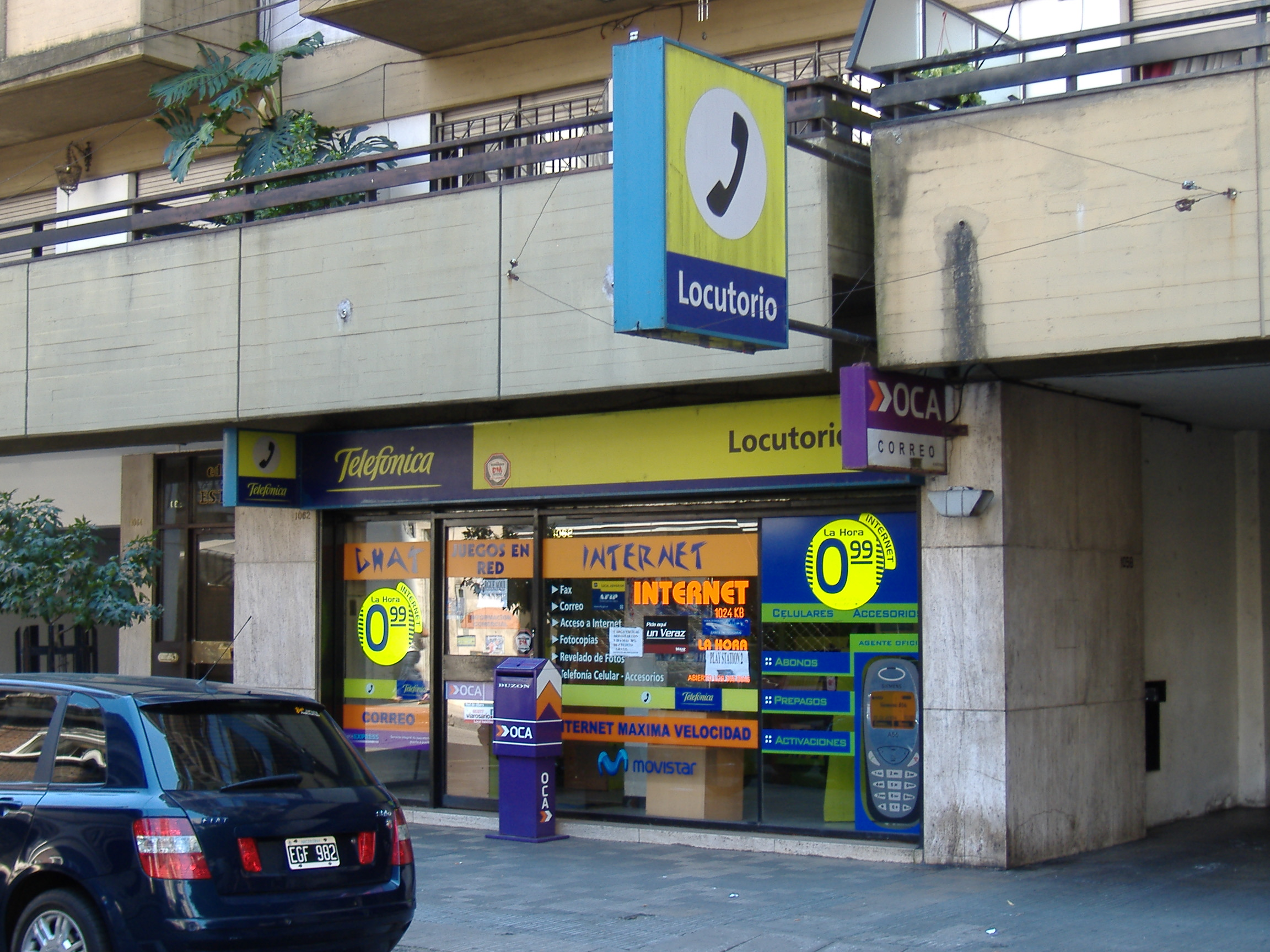
Those without residential access to a PC can avail themselves of Locutorios, the computer/postal service centers ubiquitous in Argentina.

The number of Internet users in the country as of 2011 has been estimated at 27 million (two thirds of the population), the number of registered domain names was approx. 1.7 million in August 2008 and the number of internet hosts in 2009, 6,025,000.

Besides monthly-paid Internet connections (either flat rate or with a number of free minutes), in Argentina there are also a number of Internet service providers that have commercial agreements with the telephone companies for charging a slightly higher communication rate to the user for that communication, though without any monthly fixed fee. There were around 12 million PCs registered in Argentina in 2011. The number of residential and business internet networks totaled around 5.7 million in 2011, of which around 5.5 million were broadband connections, mainly ADSL.

The number of dial-up users has decreased drastically since 2005 in favor of broadband internet access. This latter service grew from under 800,000 networks in late 2005 (compared to over 500,000 dial-up connections), to nearly 2.6 million by December 2007, and to over 5 million by late 2010 (82% of which were residential and 81% of which connected at a speed of least 512 kbit/s).Wireless and satellite networks expanded markedly during 2008–09, and totaled over 1.5 million in March 2011. Among residential users, 38.3% were located in Buenos Aires Province (including Greater Buenos Aires), 26.0% in the city of Buenos Aires, 8.2% in Córdoba and 7.4% in Santa Fe Province.

Among companies and organizations, 788,000 connection contracts were valid as of March 2011, 98% of which were broadband. Among the total (in late 2010), 44.7% correspond to the city of Buenos Aires, 21.1% to the Buenos Aires Province, 7.6% to Santa Fe Province, 6.0% to Córdoba Province and 4.5% to Patagonia.

The number of e-mail accounts in March 2011 was estimated at 4.56 million, with a monthly traffic of 3 billion messages.

Argentina's Internet top-level domain is .ar.

=== Broadband Internet access ===
ADSL first appeared in Argentina in 1998, through Speedy by Telefónica de España, a Spanish company. Fibertel, a cable provider, now offers Cablemodem service in a limited range of cities, and ADSL is monopolized by the 2 major phone companies: Telecom in the north with Arnet ADSL, and Telefónica in the south with Speedy ADSL.

In 2004, Arnet announced new plans. Controversy ensued, as in small print it mentioned that it was capped to 4 GB monthly. This plans were never put in practice until late 2005, though they were modified from the original announcements. There are no longer any capped plans. As of June 2010, they currently offer from 1 Mbit/256 kbit/s download/upload at around 20 USD/mo to 20 Mbit/s / 512 kbit/s for home users at about 77 USD/mo. Arnet has been slowly recovering its reputation, which was tarnished amongst connoisseurs due to their 2004 announcement.

=== Censorship ===
Argentina is not individually classified by the OpenNet Initiative, but is included in the ONI regional overview for Latin America.

The regulation of Internet content addresses largely the same concerns and strategies seen in North America and Europe, focusing on combating the spread of child pornography and restricting child access to age-inappropriate material. As Internet usage in Argentina increases, so do defamation, hate speech, copyright, and privacy issues.

Argentina has strengthened intellectual property rights protections by drafting and updating laws and ratifying international agreements such as the WIPO Copyright Treaty.

Since the 1997 presidential declaration regarding "Free Speech on the Internet" that guarantees Internet content the same constitutional protections for freedom of expression, Argentina has become a haven for neo-Nazi and race-hate groups around the region. In 2000 an Argentine appellate court affirmed a lower court's dismissal of a claim that a Yahoo! site selling Nazi memorabilia violated Argentina's anti-discrimination law (no. 23.592), holding that the equivalent restrictions of non-Internet speech would be unacceptable. Under Argentina's anti-discrimination law a crime is aggravated if racism is involved.

The defendant in the 2006 case Jujuy.com v. Omar Lozano was found liable for publishing slanderous content on his Web site after imputing adulterous conduct to a couple and failing to remove the content promptly. An injunction was imposed and damages were set at $40,000 (USD).

Prosecutors and police pursue cases of Internet child pornography. In June 2008 the Congress passed a law criminalizing child pornography; however, the law does not penalize possession by individuals for personal use.

In 2010 an appeals court overturned a lower-court ruling that found Google and Yahoo liable for defamation for including sex-related Web sites in their search results for an Argentine entertainer. The appeals court ruling said the firms could be held liable for defamation only if they were made aware of clearly illegal content and were negligent in removing it.

In August 2011 a judge ordered all ISPs to block the site LeakyMails, a Web site that obtains and publishes documents exposing corruption in Argentina. In response some internet service providers blocked the website IP address 216.239.32.2 which is linked to more than one million blogs hosted on Google's Blogger service disrupting the access to all of them.

In November 2012 the CNC (Spanish: Comision Nacional De Comunicaciones) ordered the blocking of websites that contained information about bootloader unlocking of netbooks supplied by the Argentine Government. The legality of these actions in Argentina remains controversial.

In July 2014 the CNC (Spanish: Comision Nacional De Comunicaciones) ordered local ISPs to block The Pirate Bay due an injunction of CAPIF (Spanish: Cámara Argentina de Productores de Fonogramas) against the popular Torrent index. CAPIF is an Argentine music industry group and a member of International Federation of the Phonographic Industry (IFPI). The CNC is an agency of the Argentine Government created to certify wireless devices; to regulate communications by radio, television, wire, satellite, cable and postal services. In retaliation for the blocking, the online site of CAPIF was hacked and turned into a Pirate Bay Proxy server.

== Radio ==
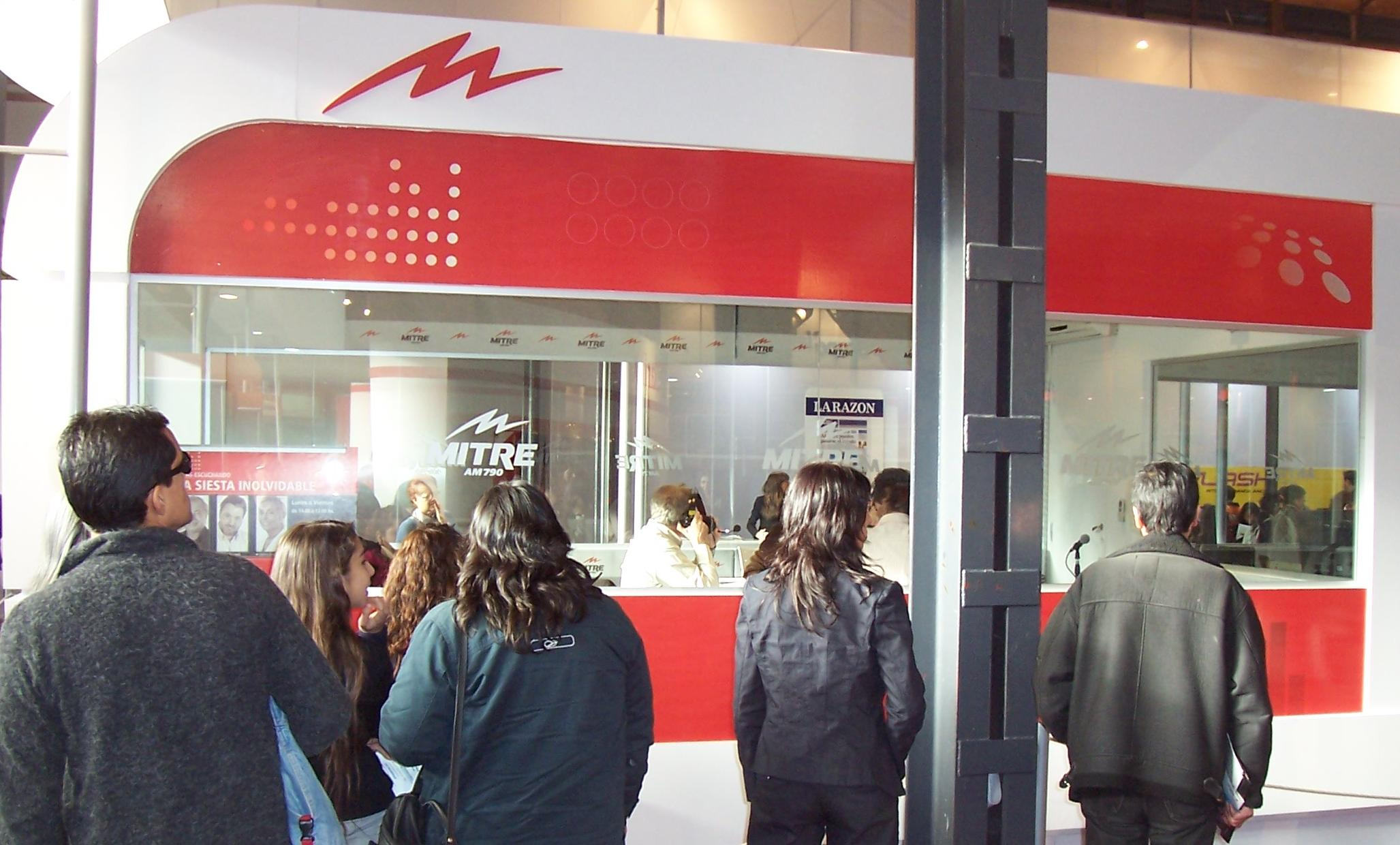
Radio Mitre at the Buenos Aires International Book Fair.

Radio broadcasting in Argentina is predated only by radio in the United States, and began on August 27, 1920, when Richard Wagner's Parsifal was broadcast by a team of medical students (the "madmen on the roof") led Enrique Susini in Buenos Aires' Teatro Coliseo. Only about twenty homes in the city had a receiver to tune in. The world's first radio station was the only one in the country until 1922, when Radio Cultura went on the air; by 1925, there were twelve stations in Buenos Aires and ten in other cities. The 1930s were the "golden age" of radio in Argentina, with live variety, news, soap opera and sport shows.

The medium, which was nationalized by President Juan Perón between 1947 and 1953, has historically been broadcast by a combination of state and private-sector operators, and most of the highest-rated stations are presently owned by a number of media conglomerates. Internet radio was first broadcast in Argentina in 2001 and by 2009, 61 stations did so, nationwide.

There are currently 260 AM broadcasting and 1150 FM broadcasting radio stations in Argentina. Radio remains an important medium in Argentina. Music and youth variety programs dominate FM formats; news, debate, and sports are AM radio's primary broadcasts. Amateur radio is widespread in the country.

=== Censorship ===
The Federal Broadcasting Committee (COMFER) has continued to apply certain broadcasting regulations that were instituted during military rule. One such article "banning creation of permanent privately owned networks" was used to revoke the FM radio license of Radio Continental in 2008. Critics pointed out that the relevant law had been selectively applied and accused COMFER of attempting to suppress criticism of the government.

A 2018 court case punished Radio 10 host Baby Etchecopar for comments made in his show "El Angel". Prosecutors collected eight pages of allegedly sexist remarks by Etchecopar and devised a programming schedule which they say "promotes tolerance". To avoid a harsher sentence, Etchecopar agreed to invite twenty gender specialists onto his program to speak uninterrupted for ten minutes at a time with no criticism following the appearance.

== Television ==
The Argentine television industry is large and diverse, widely viewed in Latin America, and its productions seen around the world. Many local programs are broadcast by networks in other countries, and others have their rights purchased by foreign producers for adaptations in their own markets. Argentina has five major networks. All provincial capitals and other large cities have at least one local station. Argentines enjoy the highest availability of cable and satellite television in Latin America, similar to percentages in North America. Many cable networks operate from Argentina and serve the Spanish-speaking world, including Utilísima Satelital, TyC Sports, Fox Sports en Español (with the United States and México), MTV Argentina, Cosmopolitan TV, and the news network Todo Noticias.

Argentine television broadcasting began in 1951 with the inaugural of state-owned Channel 7 (since privatized). A technology jealously guarded by U.S. broadcasters at the time, this was largely the achievement of Jewish-Argentine engineer and radio pioneer Jaime Yankelevich. Color television broadcasting, however, was not widely available until after 1978, when the government launched Argentina Televisora Color (ATC), now Channel 7 (Argentina's principal public television station). The prevalence of cable television, increasing steadily since the first CATV transmitter opened in the city of Junín in 1965, is now the third-widest in the world, reaching at least 78% of households.

Radio and television broadcasting, whose ownership structure had become increasingly concentrated since the 1980 Media Law, is regulated by a new law advanced by President Cristina Kirchner, and signed on November 11, 2009. This new policy would restrict the number of media licences per proprietor and allocate a greater share of these to the state and NGOs, thereby limiting the influence of the Clarín Group (the largest media conglomerate in Argentina) and other media companies, such as the conservative La Nación.

There are currently 42 television broadcast stations and 12.5 million television sets in Argentina.

== Newspapers ==
The print media industry is highly developed and independent of the government, with more than two hundred newspapers. The major national newspapers are from Buenos Aires, including the centrist Clarín, the best-selling daily in Latin America and the second most widely circulated in the Spanish-speaking world. Other nationally circulated papers are La Nación (center-right, published since 1870), Página/12 (left-wing), Ámbito Financiero (business conservative), Olé (sports) and Crónica (populist).

Two foreign language newspapers enjoy a relatively high circulation: the Argentinisches Tageblatt in German and the Buenos Aires Herald, published since 1876. Major regional papers include La Voz del Interior (Córdoba), Río Negro (General Roca), Los Andes (Mendoza), La Capital (Rosario), El Tribuno (Salta) and La Gaceta (Tucuman). The most circulated newsmagazine is Noticias. The Argentine publishing industry, which includes Atlántida, Eudeba, and Emecé, among numerous others, ranks with Spain's and Mexico's as the most important in the Spanish-speaking world, and includes the largest bookstore chain in Latin America, El Ateneo.
