= Álvaro Alsogaray =

Argentine politician and economist

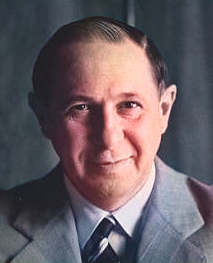
- Portrait of Alsogaray, 1960

National Deputy
- In office 10 December 1983 – 10 December 1999
- Constituency: City of Buenos Aires

Minister of Economy
- In office 30 June 1962 – 10 December 1962
- President: José María Guido
- Preceded by: Federico Pinedo
- Succeeded by: Eustaquio Méndez Delfino
- In office 25 June 1959 – 26 April 1961
- President: Arturo Frondizi
- Preceded by: Emilio del Carril
- Succeeded by: Roberto Alemann

Argentine Ambassador to the United States
- In office 3 October 1966 – 11 October 1968
- Preceded by: Norberto Miguel Barrenechea
- Succeeded by: Eduardo A. Roca

Minister of Industry
- In office 13 November 1955 – 8 June 1956
- President: Pedro Eugenio Aramburu
- Preceded by: Horacio Morixe
- Succeeded by: Rodolfo Martínez

Personal details
- Born: 22 June 1913 Esperanza, Santa Fe
- Died: 1 April 2005 (aged 91) Buenos Aires
- Party: Independent Civic Party (1956–1966); New Force (1972–1976); Union of the Democratic Centre (1982–2005)
- Other political affiliations: Centre Alliance (1989)
- Spouse: Edith Ana Gay
- Education: National Military College; National University of Córdoba

Álvaro Carlos Alsogaray (22 June 1913 – 1 April 2005) was an Argentine politician and economist. He has been known for being Minister of Economy on two occasions, Minister of Industry, Ambassador to the United States, and National Deputy. He played an important role with the Azules in the confrontation against the Colorados. He promoted economic liberalism in the second half of the 20th century and founded the political party Unión Del Centro Democrático (UCeDé).

He managed to spread his liberal ideology in unthinkable social sectors. Carlos Menem, winner in 1989 of the popular vote of Peronism, adopted his preaching in favor of privatization and the free market. He also advocated for a social market economy

== First years ==
Alsogaray was born in Esperanza, Santa Fe, in 1913, as the eldest of three children to Julia Elisa Bosch and Álvaro Alsogaray. Born to a prominent local military family, Alsogaray graduated from the National Military College as an infantry officer. He studied military engineering in the Army's School of Higher Technical Studies and civil and aeronautical engineering at the National University of Córdoba. He married Edith Gay in 1940, and had two sons and a daughter.

== Early career ==
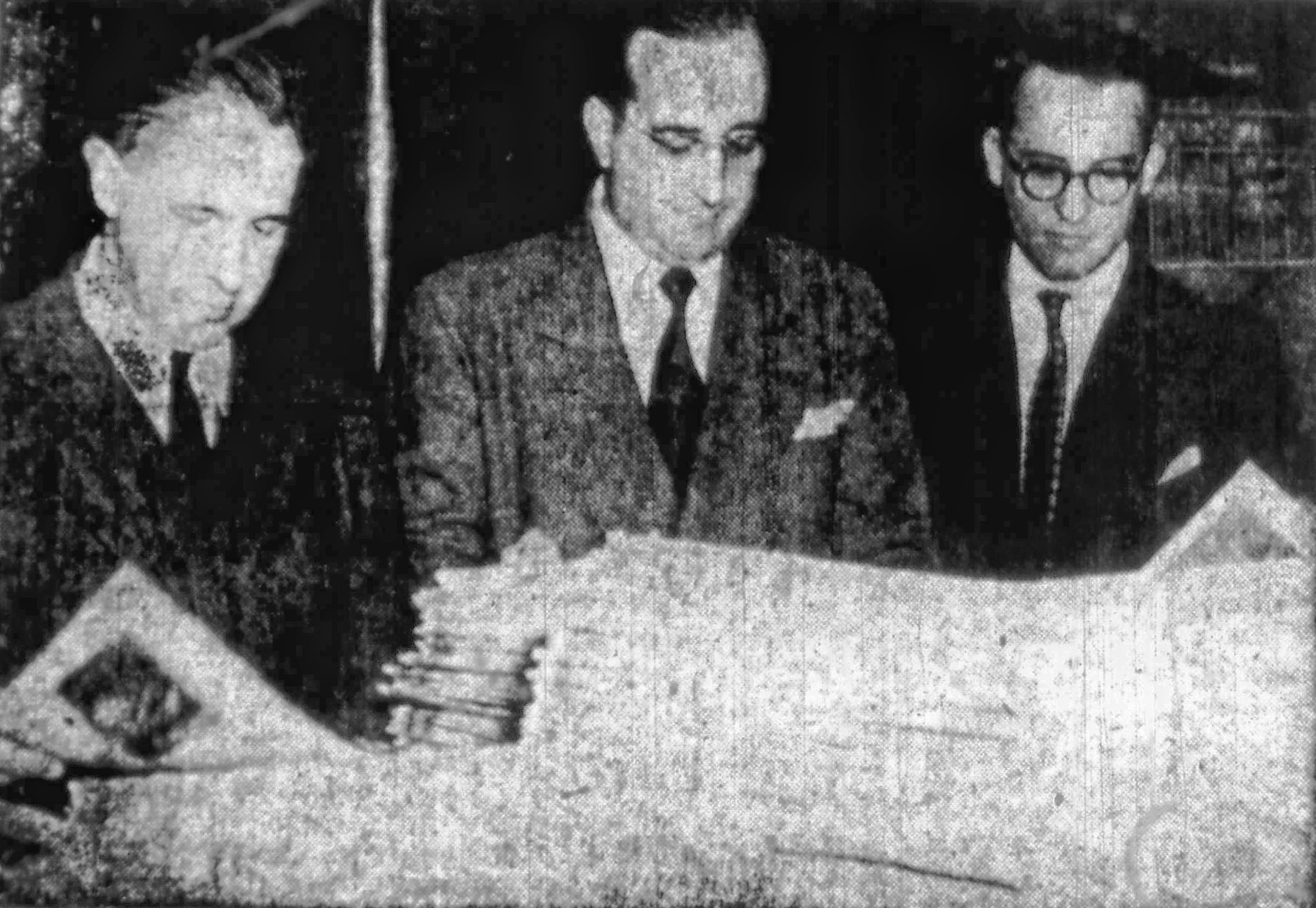
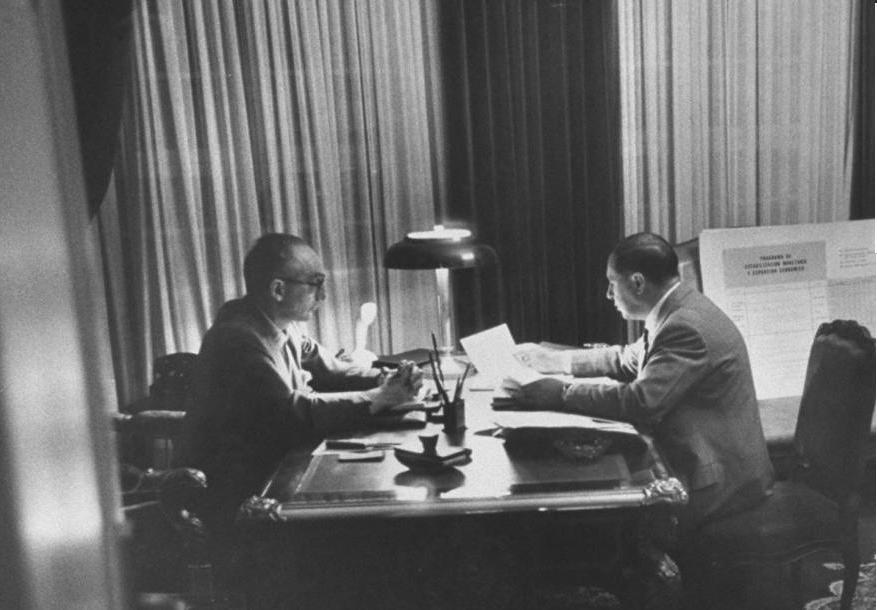
Top to bottom: Alsogaray (left), representing Fibrocel S.A., as one of 100 foreign industrial representatives in Holyoke, Massachusetts, reviews the world's first run of bagasse newsprint on January 26, 1950, with César Augusto Bunge (right); Alsogaray and President Arturo Frondizi (left), who appointed the conservative businessman under pressure from the military, 1959.

He retired from the army with the rank of captain and with two engineering degrees, which led to his being called el capitán ingeniero. He entered business, becoming an important contractor for State enterprises such as FAMA (a predecessor of flag carrier Aerolíneas Argentinas), and briefly served as its director during the presidency of Juan Perón, whose populist politics and policies would later be anathema to Alsogaray's thinking.

After the coup that removed Perón in 1955, he held the posts of Under-secretary of Commerce and Minister of Industry, and maintained numerous Peronist staffers at the Undersecretariat despite his support for the coup. He founded the Independent Civic Party in 1956; the party fared modestly in the 1958 elections.

== Minister of Economy with Frondizi and Guido ==
To placate powerful agrarian interests and other conservatives, the otherwise progressive Arturo Frondizi named Alsogaray Minister of the Economy in early 1959. Inheriting large trade deficits, Alsogaray sharply devalued the peso and imposed severe credit controls on Argentina's large public banks.

Declaring that the economy "must go through winter", the austerity measures were a boon to exporters - but caused consumer prices to double in 1959, and real wages and construction to fall by about 20%. The resulting trade surplus and pro-growth policies pursued by Frondizi's point man on the economy, Rogelio Frigerio, both contributed to a robust recovery in 1960 and 1961.

Marginalized in favor of Frigerio after the 1959 recession and deeply unpopular, Alsogaray resigned early in 1961. Frigerio had been President Frondizi's first choice for the critical Economy Ministry, an appointment thwarted by the military; Frondizi and Frigerio later founded the MID, a political party centered around the need for accelerated development.

Frondizi's efforts to mediate differences between the United States and Cuba ultimately resulted in a March 1962 coup d'état, and Álvaro Alsogaray was able to use the influence of his brother, General Julio Alsogaray, to secure several ministerial and planning posts under Frondizi's military-appointed successor, Senate President José María Guido. Reintroducing many of his restrictive 1959 policies, as well as nearly worthless "Ninth of July" bonds, which were issued in lieu of cash payments to public employees and government contractors, the economy again slipped into severe recession; the trade balance improved, albeit the cost of depressed business investment.

== Later career ==
Out of power after the election of Dr. Arturo Illia in 1963, Alsogaray devoted himself to undermining the new administration, even during the vigorous economic recovery that followed. Finding allies in conservative business and media interests, the powerful Roman Catholic Church, and his influential brother Julio, Alsogaray and other Illia opponents were successful.

Following the 1966 coup against President Illia, he was designated Ambassador to the United States, a post he held until 1968.

Alsogaray founded the 'New Force' in 1972, though like the Independent Civic Party, it fared poorly in the 1973 elections that returned Perón to power. He was among the few conservative figures to publicly oppose the imminent March 1976 coup, but largely supported the subsequent National Reorganization Process.

As the dictatorship eventually yielded to calls for elections, he founded the Union of the Democratic Centre in August 1982.

Running as a right-wing, economically conservative candidate on the latter ticket, he stood for the Presidency in 1983 and 1989. Alsogaray received 10% votes in his 1989 election, behind only major party candidates Carlos Menem and Eduardo Angeloz.

== National Deputy ==
Continuing to enjoy a measure of support in Buenos Aires' affluent northside, he and his daughter María Julia Alsogaray were elected the only two national deputies for the UCeDé in 1983, and he served until 1999.

A vehement anti-Peronist and anti-socialist, Alsogaray forged an alliance with the late Juan Perón's Justicialist Party in 1989, following their nomination of pro-market Governor Carlos Menem, and endorsed Justicialist candidate Eduardo Vaca that year in a tightly contested seat in the Argentine Senate representing the City of Buenos Aires. Argentine Senators were indirectly elected at the time, and Alsogaray's endorsement in the electoral college gave Vaca the seat, despite the latter's coming in second to centrist UCR candidate Fernando de la Rúa. The Universidad Francisco Marroquín granted Alsogaray an honorary doctorate in 1985.

A vocal supporter of the era's privatizations, he prevailed on President Menem to appoint his daughter, María Julia, Secretary of the Environment, in which post she served from 1991 to 1999, and himself served in numerous consultative posts during the Menem presidency, endorsing the populist-turned-conservative president in his 1995 election.

Among his most notable roles in this era was as director of a feasibility study in 1995-96 for the replacement of Buenos Aires' two international airports for an island terminal on the Río de la Plata; opposed by de la Rúa, who had been elected Mayor (and would later be president), the project never materialized.

His UCedé party languished despite his renewed influence as much due to public mistrust of his policies, as because of rivalries in the party itself – notably between his daughter and Adelina D'Alessio de Viola (whom he had Menem appoint as head of the Banco Hipotecario). Commenting on the dispute, he remarked that "would it that one's political party could do without affiliates...or women!"

== Final years ==
In his last public appearances, Alsogaray urged his followers to take up the banners of economic liberalism and the social market economy, while expressing his pessimism about the management of Néstor Kirchner, which he associated with aspects of socialism.

He died on April 1, 2005, at his home in the Recoleta neighborhood of Buenos Aires, after a long illness, at the age of 91.
