= Telecom Personal =

Argentina communications company

Telecom Personal S.A.
- Company type: Subsidiary
- Industry: Telecommunications
- Founded: 9 January 1995; 31 years ago
- Headquarters: Alicia Moreau de Justo 50; Buenos Aires, Argentina
- Products: high speed internet, cable internet, fiber-optic internet, mobile telephony
- Parent: Telecom Argentina
- Website: personal.com.ar

Personal is an Argentine telecommunications company which provides Internet and mobile telephony services throughout the country. A subsidiary of Telecom, it started as a mobile service provider from its foundation in 1995 until 2021 when it absorbed Telecom's Fibertel and Cablevisión subsidiaries, combining both broadband and mobile internet services under one brand. Personal is Argentina's second-largest mobile phone service provider, after Telefonica's Movistar.

== History ==
Personal was launched in 1995 as the mobile phone brand for parent company Telecom, and provided mobile services in the northern part of the country (where its parent company also provided fixed telephony services). In the metropolitan area of Buenos Aires, instead, Telecom provided mobile phone services since 1993 under the brand Miniphone, in a joint venture together with Telefónica. However, in 1999, legal provisions determine the division of Miniphone, as well as of all those companies whose shareholders were Telecom and Telefónica. It is from there that Telecom Personal also begins to provide service in Greater Buenos Aires independently (keeping part of the clients of the divided Miniphone).
