= 1989 Argentine general election =

- 14 May 1989
- Presidential election

600 members of the Electoral College 301 votes needed to win
- Registered: 20,034,252
- Turnout: 85.31%
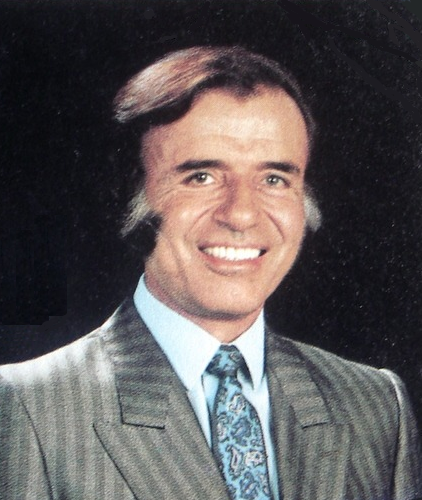

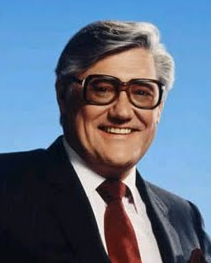

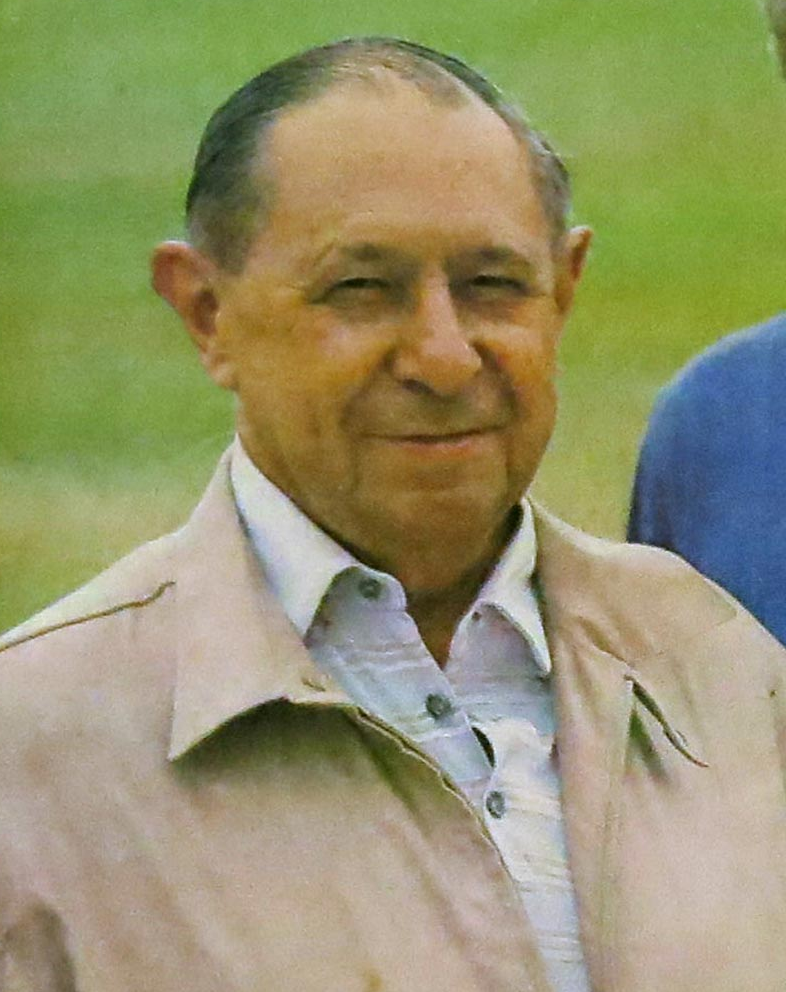
Nominee	Carlos Menem	Eduardo Angeloz	Álvaro Alsogaray
Party	PJ	UCR	UCEDE
Alliance	FREJUPO	UCR + CFI	Centre Alliance
Running mate	Eduardo Duhalde	Juan Manuel Casella; María C. Guzmán	Alberto Natale
Electoral vote	312	234	33
Popular vote	7,957,518	6,213,217	1,200,172
Percentage	47.51%	37.10%	7.17%
- Popular vote (left) and electoral vote (right) by province
President before election
Raúl Alfonsín
UCR
Elected President
Carlos Menem
PJ
- Chamber of Deputies
- 127 of 254 seats in the Chamber of Deputies
- Turnout: 85.31%
Party	Vote %	Seats	+/–
Justicialist Front of Popular Unity	44.82	66	+13
Radical Civic Union	29.23	42	−23
Centre Alliance	10.79	10	+4
Independent Federalist Confederation	3.39	3	+1
United Left	3.49	1	+1
White Party of Retirees	1.81	1	New
Republican Force	1.29	2	New
Renewal Crusade	0.52	1	New
Neuquén People's Movement	0.29	1	0
This lists parties that won seats. See the complete results below.
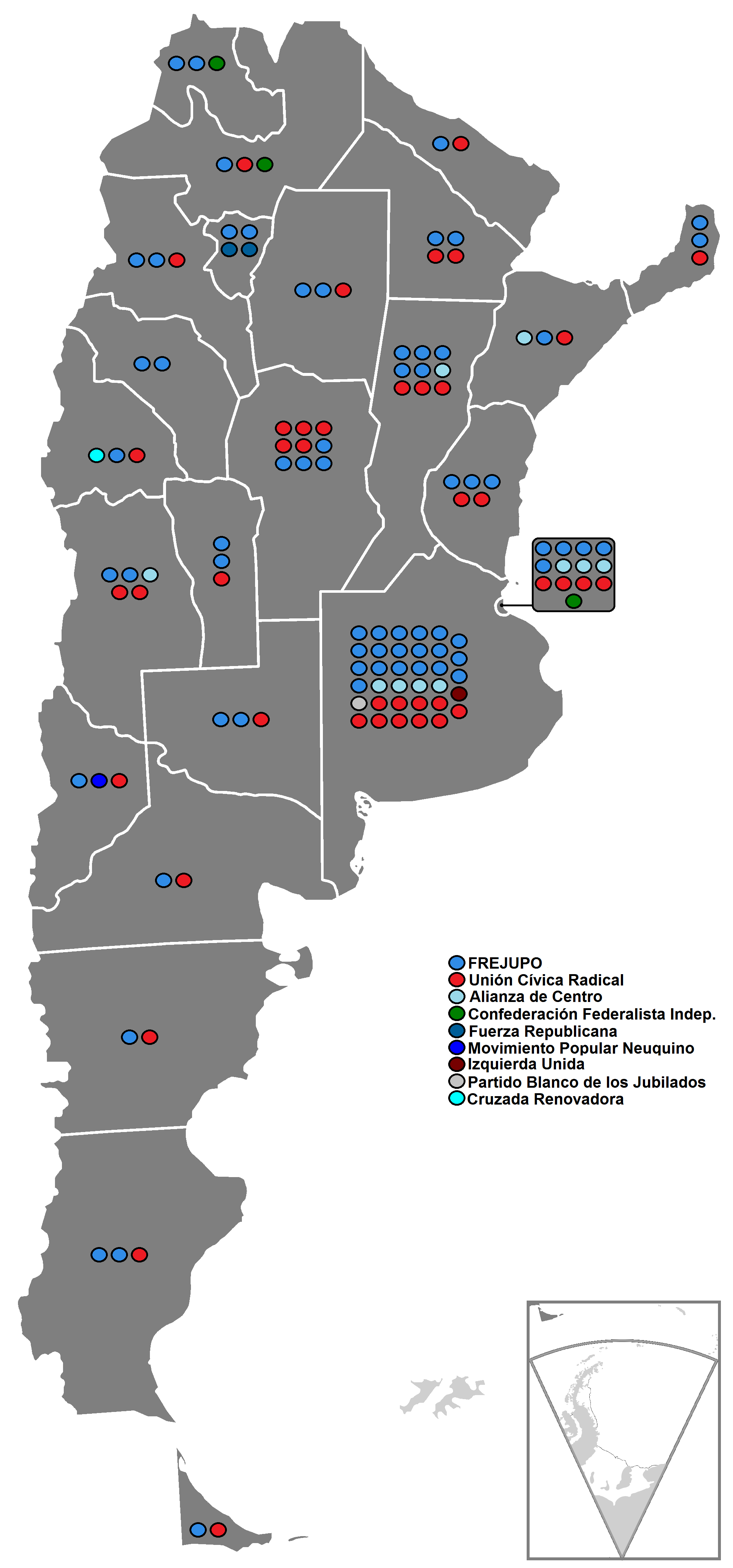
Results by province

General elections were held in Argentina on 14 May 1989. Voters chose both the President and their legislators and with a turnout of 85%, Carlos Menem won the presidency, and the Peronist Justicialist Party won the control of both houses of Congress. This was the last presidential election in which the president was elected by the electoral college.

== Background ==
Inheriting a difficult legacy from his military predecessors, President Raúl Alfonsín's tenure had been practically defined by the foreign debt Argentina's last dictatorship left behind. Signs of unraveling in Alfonsín's 1985 Austral Plan for economic stabilization cost his centrist Radical Civic Union (UCR) its majorities in the Chamber of Deputies (lower house of Congress) and among the nation's 22 governorships in the September 1987 mid-term elections. Facing a restive armed forces opposed to trials against past human rights abuses and mounting inflation, the president brought elections forward five months, now scheduled for May 14, 1989. Both major parties held national conventions in May 1988. The UCR nominated Córdoba Governor Eduardo Angeloz, a safe, centrist choice and the most prominent UCR figure not closely tied to the unpopular President Alfonsín. In an upset, however, Carlos Menem, governor of the remote and thinly populated La Rioja Province, wrested the Justicialist Party nomination from the odds-on candidate, Buenos Aires Province Governor Antonio Cafiero, a policy maker close to the Justicialists' founder, the late Juan Perón. Cafiero's defeat resulted largely from CGT trade union opposition to his Peronist Renewal faction; Alfonsín's top political adviser, Interior Minister Enrique Nosiglia, in turn saw Menem's flamboyance as an opportunity for the struggling UCR.

The Justicialists (Peronists) took a sizable lead in polling early on, however, even as nearly half the voters remained undecided. Hoping to translate this into a UCR victory over the outspoken and eccentric Menem, President Alfonsín enacted an August 1988 "Springtime Plan" in a bid for lower inflation (then running at 27% monthly). The plan, criticized as a rehashed "Austral Plan" by the CGT, called for budget cuts and renewed wage freezes - policies they blamed for sliding living standards. Initially successful, a record drought late in the year buffeted critical export earnings and led to rolling blackouts, dissipating any gains Angeloz might have made from the "relief" of 6% monthly inflation.

A perennial third-party candidate, conservative economist Álvaro Alsogaray, made gains following the January 1989 assault by Trotskyist militants on the La Tablada Barracks, west of Buenos Aires. Twice minister of the economy and remembered for his belief that the economy must go through "winter," the unpopular Alsogaray ran on a free market platform, calling for mass privatizations and deep cuts in social spending (amid 30% poverty). Angeloz took the controversial decision of including social spending cuts in the UCR platform, as well, earning the right-wing Federal Party's endorsement, but alienating many others (particularly pensioners, among whom Alfonsín had won decisively in 1983). The largely civil campaign became increasingly a debate between the Justicialist nominee and the president, himself; Angeloz, the UCR nominee, remained "presidential" during the frequent exchanges of innuendo between Alfonsín and Menem.

Following a sharp drop in Central Bank reserves, the austral fell around 29% to the U.S. dollar in heavy trading on "black Tuesday," February 7. The sudden drop in the austral's value threatened the nation's tenuous financial stability and, later that month, the World Bank recalled a large tranche of a loan package agreed on in 1988, sending the austral into a tailspin: trading at 17 to the dollar in January, the dollar quoted at over 100 australes by election day, May 14. Inflation, which had been held to the 5-10% monthly range as late as February, rose to 78.5% in May, shattering records and leading to a landslide victory for the Peronists. Polling revealed that economic anxieties were paramount among two-thirds of voters and Menem won in 19 of 22 provinces, while losing in the traditionally anti-Peronist Federal District (Buenos Aires).

The nation's finances did not stabilize after the election, as hoped. The austral halved to the dollar next week, alone, and on May 29, riots broke out in the poorer outskirts of a number of cities. Having declared his intention to stay on until inaugural day, December 10, these events and spiraling financial chaos led Alfonsín to transfer power to President-elect Menem five months early, on July 8. When Menem accepted the presidential sash from Alfonsín, it marked the first time since 1916 that an incumbent government peacefully transferred power to the opposition.

== Presidential candidates ==
- Justicialist Party (Peronist, populist): Governor Carlos Menem of La Rioja Province
- Radical Civic Union (Center-left, social liberal): Governor Eduardo Angeloz of Córdoba Province
- Union of the Democratic Centre (Center-right, conservative liberal): Deputy Álvaro Alsogaray of the City of Buenos Aires

== Results ==
=== President ===
Candidate	Running mate	Party or alliance		Popular vote		Electoral College	
Candidate	Running mate	Party or alliance		Votes	%	Votes	%
Carlos Menem	Eduardo Duhalde	Justicialist; Front of Popular Unity	Justicialist Front of Popular Unity	7,841,028	46.81	305	50.83
Carlos Menem	Eduardo Duhalde	Justicialist; Front of Popular Unity	Renewal Current	113,163	0.68	7	1.17
Carlos Menem	Eduardo Duhalde	Justicialist; Front of Popular Unity	Labor and People's Party	2,770	0.02		
Carlos Menem	Eduardo Duhalde	Justicialist; Front of Popular Unity	Integration and Development Movement	557	0.00		
Carlos Menem	Eduardo Duhalde	Justicialist; Front of Popular Unity	Total	7,957,518	47.51	312	52.00
Eduardo Angeloz	Juan Manuel Casella	Radical Civic Union	Radical Civic Union	5,162,574	30.82	198	33.00
Eduardo Angeloz	Juan Manuel Casella	Radical Civic Union	UCR–CFI	220,505	1.32	9	1.50
Eduardo Angeloz	Juan Manuel Casella	Radical Civic Union	UCR–Mobilization–MPC	50,970	0.30	6	1.00
Eduardo Angeloz	Juan Manuel Casella	Radical Civic Union	Total	5,434,049	32.44	213	35.50
Álvaro Alsogaray	Alberto Natale	Centre Alliance	Centre Alliance	1,042,984	6.23	28	4.67
Álvaro Alsogaray	Alberto Natale	Centre Alliance	PAL–PDP–MLP	106,774	0.64	5	0.83
Álvaro Alsogaray	Alberto Natale	Centre Alliance	Union of the Democratic Centre	49,767	0.30		
Álvaro Alsogaray	Alberto Natale	Centre Alliance	Democratic Progressive Party	647	0.00		
Álvaro Alsogaray	Alberto Natale	Centre Alliance	Total	1,200,172	7.17	33	5.50
Eduardo Angeloz	María Cristina Guzmán	Independent; Federalist; Confederation	Independent Federalist Confederation	675,101	4.03	21	3.50
Eduardo Angeloz	María Cristina Guzmán	Independent; Federalist; Confederation	CFI–PF	93,013	0.56		
Eduardo Angeloz	María Cristina Guzmán	Independent; Federalist; Confederation	Federal Party	11,054	0.07		
Eduardo Angeloz	María Cristina Guzmán	Independent; Federalist; Confederation	Total	779,168	4.65	21	3.50
Néstor Vicente	Luis Zamora	United Left		409,250	2.44	1	0.17
José Corzo Gómez	Federico Houssay	White Party of Retirees		315,600	1.88	7	1.17
Guillermo Estévez Boero	Alfredo Bravo	Socialist Unity	Socialist Unity	218,950	1.31		
Guillermo Estévez Boero	Alfredo Bravo	Socialist Unity	Popular Socialist Party	15,836	0.09		
Guillermo Estévez Boero	Alfredo Bravo	Socialist Unity	Socialist Party	3,600	0.02		
Guillermo Estévez Boero	Alfredo Bravo	Socialist Unity	Democratic Socialist Party	1,746	0.01		
Guillermo Estévez Boero	Alfredo Bravo	Socialist Unity	Total	240,132	1.43		
Antonio Domingo Bussi	Antonio Álvarez	Republican Force		185,036	1.10	7	1.17
Jorge Altamira	Gregorio Flores	Workers' Party		45,763	0.27		
Luis Alberto Ammann	Lía Méndez	Humanist–Green Front		42,316	0.25		
No candidate	No candidate	Neuquén People's Movement		35,466	0.21	4	0.67
No candidate	No candidate	Blockist Alliance		27,004	0.16	1	0.17
No candidate	No candidate	Chaco Action		19,831	0.12	1	0.17
No candidate	No candidate	Renewal Crusade		11,236	0.07		
Ángel Bustelo	Eduardo Hernández	Popular Action	Popular Action	4,773	0.03		
Ángel Bustelo	Eduardo Hernández	Popular Action	Liberation Socialist Workers' Party	2,715	0.02		
Ángel Bustelo	Eduardo Hernández	Popular Action	Anti-Imperialist Popular Democratic Movement	1,345	0.01		
Ángel Bustelo	Eduardo Hernández	Popular Action	Popular Accord	1,324	0.01		
Ángel Bustelo	Eduardo Hernández	Popular Action	Total	10,157	0.06		
No candidate	No candidate	Renewal Unit Movement		7,661	0.05		
No candidate	No candidate	Blue, Loyalty, Restoration		7,287	0.04		
No candidate	No candidate	Independence Party		4,083	0.02		
No candidate	No candidate	Democratic Party of Jujuy		2,487	0.01		
No candidate	No candidate	Retirees Party		2,340	0.01		
No candidate	No candidate	Liberal Democratic Party–Provincial Popular Movement		2,327	0.01		
Mario Hugo Geller	Elisa Delboy	Liberation Party		1,851	0.01		
No candidate	No candidate	Renewal Front		1,281	0.01		
No candidate	No candidate	Tradition and Coherence		1,181	0.01		
No candidate	No candidate	Social Justice		1,147	0.01		
No candidate	No candidate	Autonomist Union Front		973	0.01		
No candidate	No candidate	Provincial Union		966	0.01		
No candidate	No candidate	Provincial Action		838	0.01		
No candidate	No candidate	Provincial Defence–White Flag		651	0.00		
No candidate	No candidate	Fuegian People's Movement		472	0.00		
No candidate	No candidate	Nationalist Movement		245	0.00		
No candidate	No candidate	Populist Unification		243	0.00		
No candidate	No candidate	Authentic Socialist Party		216	0.00		
No candidate	No candidate	Authentic Formosa Party		181	0.00		
Total				16,749,128	100.00	600	100.00
Valid votes				16,749,128	98.02		
Invalid votes				116,049	0.68		
Blank votes				222,048	1.30		
Total votes				17,087,225	100.00		
Registered voters/turnout				20,034,252	85.29		
Source: DINE, Ministry of the Interior

=== Chamber of Deputies ===
Party	Votes	%	Seats	
Party	Votes	%	Won	Total
Justicialist Front of Popular Unity	7,460,488	44.82	66	127
Radical Civic Union	4,865,835	29.23	42	93
Centre Alliance	1,796,271	10.79	10	18
Independent Federalist Confederation	565,080	3.39	3	5
United Left	580,943	3.49	1	1
Socialist Unity	451,177	2.71	0	1
White Party of Retirees	301,101	1.81	1	1
Republican Force	213,957	1.29	2	2
Renewal Crusade	87,273	0.52	1	1
Workers' Party	53,671	0.32	0	0
Humanist–Green Front	49,491	0.30	0	0
Neuquén People's Movement	49,070	0.29	1	2
Chaco Action	45,298	0.27	0	0
Blockist Alliance	39,171	0.24	0	1
Río Negro Provincial Party	22,331	0.13	0	1
Renewal Unit Movement	9,027	0.05	0	0
Blue, Loyalty, Restoration	7,638	0.05	0	0
PDL–MPP	7,359	0.04	0	0
Social Justice	5,878	0.04	0	0
Renewal Front	4,770	0.03	0	0
Independence Party	4,749	0.03	0	0
Popular Accord	9,549	0.06	0	0
Democratic Party of Jujuy	2,544	0.02	0	0
Fuegian People's Movement	2,309	0.01	0	0
Liberation Party	1,944	0.01	0	0
Christian Democratic Party	1,831	0.01	0	0
Authentic Socialist Party	1,666	0.01	0	0
Tradition and Coherence	1,426	0.01	0	0
Autonomist Union Front	1,149	0.01	0	0
Provincial Union	1,002	0.01	0	0
Provincial Defence–White Flag	816	0.00	0	1
Nationalist Movement	418	0.00	0	0
Authentic Formosa Party	246	0.00	0	0
Emancipatory Front	38	0.00	0	0
Total	16,645,516	100.00	127	254
Valid votes	16,645,516	97.61		
Invalid votes	99,482	0.58		
Blank votes	307,578	1.80		
Total votes	17,052,576	100.00		
Registered voters/turnout	20,034,252	85.12		
Source: DINE, Ministry of the Interior

==== By province ====
Province	FREJUPO			UCR			Center Alliance			CFI			Others		
Province	Votes	%	Seats	Votes	%	Seats	Votes	%	Seats	Votes	%	Seats	Votes	%	Seats
Buenos Aires	3,042,080	48.37	19	1,655,591	26.32	10	630,163	10.02	4	190,445	3.03	—	770,828	12.25	2
Buenos Aires City	641,767	31.51	5	580,197	28.49	4	449,822	22.09	3	146,540	7.19	1	218,392	10.73	—
Catamarca	68,098	54.23	2	51,285	40.84	1	1,257	1.00	—	—	—	—	4,924	3.92	—
Chaco	190,605	49.17	2	133,986	34.56	2	6,713	1.73	—	1,651	0.43	—	54,685	14.10	—
Chubut	54,583	38.48	1	39,815	28.07	1	9,681	6.82	—	25,516	17.99	—	12,257	8.64	—
Córdoba	664,858	43.37	4	669,338	43.67	5	120,759	7.88	—	—	—	—	77,905	5.08	—
Corrientes	120,807	32.58	1	89,798	24.22	1	151,613	40.89	1	3,371	0.91	—	5,184	1.40	—
Entre Ríos	283,517	50.49	3	208,634	37.15	2	46,864	8.34	—	—	—	—	22,567	4.02	—
Formosa	93,949	58.46	1	63,155	39.30	1	2,000	1.24	—	—	—	—	1,589	0.99	—
Jujuy	84,266	41.75	2	31,687	15.70	—	2,734	1.35	—	41,724	20.67	1	41,407	20.52	—
La Pampa	73,413	51.11	2	53,144	37.00	1	7,488	5.21	—	2,799	1.95	—	6,802	4.73	—
La Rioja	69,062	67.14	2	29,406	28.59	—	1,315	1.28	—	16	0.02	—	3,062	2.97	—
Mendoza	291,673	42.04	2	203,392	29.31	2	141,237	20.36	1	3,494	0.50	—	54,048	7.79	—
Misiones	162,361	52.21	2	115,401	37.11	1	20,080	6.46	—	7,158	2.30	—	5,965	1.92	—
Neuquén	54,347	36.47	1	35,600	23.89	1	4,815	3.23	—	—	—	—	54,276	36.42	1
Río Negro	85,129	42.95	1	71,968	36.31	1	9,799	4.94	—	—	—	—	31,322	15.80	—
Salta	154,116	42.66	1	91,225	25.25	1	7,647	2.12	—	88,294	24.44	1	20,005	5.54	—
San Juan	64,740	24.47	1	48,174	18.21	1	18,749	7.09	—	—	—	—	132,857	50.23	1
San Luis	66,337	48.34	2	52,564	38.30	1	5,201	3.79	—	—	—	—	13,129	9.57	—
Santa Cruz	32,933	52.94	2	23,964	38.52	1	3,102	4.99	—	—	—	—	2,207	3.55	—
Santa Fe	740,538	48.01	5	438,268	28.41	3	144,393	9.36	1	14,494	0.94	—	204,834	13.28	—
Santiago del Estero	195,471	65.49	2	87,920	29.46	1	2,394	0.80	—	3,219	1.08	—	9,469	3.17	—
Tierra del Fuego	10,989	39.51	1	8,444	30.36	1	2,023	7.27	—	318	1.14	—	6,039	21.72	—
Tucumán	214,849	39.47	2	82,879	15.23	—	6,422	1.18	—	36,041	6.62	—	204,089	37.50	2
Total	7,460,488	44.82	66	4,865,835	29.23	42	1,796,271	10.79	10	565,080	3.39	3	1,957,842	11.77	6
