= Cablevisión (Argentina) =

Argentine cable and internet provider

Cablevisión S.A.
- Type: S.A.
- Industry: Telecommunications; Mass media
- Founded: August 29, 1981
- Defunct: October 2021; 4 years ago
- Fate: Merged with Telecom Argentina in 2017, dissolved in 2021; services continued under the "Flow" brand
- Headquarters: Buenos Aires, Argentina
- Area served: Argentina, Paraguay, Uruguay
- Key people: Carlos Alberto Moltini (CEO)
- Services: Cable; Internet
- Revenue: ▲$2.280 billion USD (2014)
- Net income: ▲$332.44 million USD (2014)
- Number of employees: 9065 (2014)
- Parent: Clarín Group (2006–2017); Telecom (2017–2021)
- Website: flow.com.ar

Cablevisión S.A. was an Argentine company that provided cable television and internet services in its country of origin, Paraguay and Uruguay. Established in 1981, the company was acquired by the Clarín Group (Multicanal) in 2006, then merging with Telecom Argentina. Cablevisión was the biggest cable TV provider in Argentina with 3,377,082 customers.

As part of an internal reorganisation, in October 2021 Telecom dissolved Cablevisión, focusing on the brands Telecom, Personal, and Flow. The company kept all the services provided under the former brand names "Cablevisión" and "Fibertel".
