= Test data management =

Test data management (TDM) is the process of providing, preparing, securing, and maintaining the data needed to test software components and systems. It includes activities such as identifying required data, discovering and masking sensitive data, creating or selecting datasets, preserving relationships among records, provisioning data to test environments, and refreshing or restoring data between test cycles.

TDM is an integral part of the software development lifecycle (SDLC) and supports software testing by helping ensure that appropriate test data is available throughout the testing process. It is relevant to manual and automated testing, including performance testing, integration testing, continuous testing, environments that use continuous integration and DevOps, and AI-assisted software development.

== Overview ==
Test data management includes the generation, selection, preparation, and provisioning of data for testing purposes, as well as its distribution across test environments. It also involves controlling data versions and ensuring that datasets correspond to specific test scenarios. In many cases, production data is adapted for testing through techniques such as masking or subsetting to reduce size and remove sensitive content.

The objectives of TDM include making appropriate data available for specific test cases, supporting repeatable test execution, protecting sensitive information in non-production environments, and reducing delays caused by unavailable or inconsistent datasets. In enterprise environments, test data may be distributed across multiple applications, databases, cloud services, and other systems, requiring coordination to preserve relationships between related records and maintain consistency across test environments.

Common test data management activities include discovering and masking sensitive data, extracting subsets of production data, generating synthetic data, provisioning datasets to test environments, and refreshing or restoring data between test cycles. TDM helps ensure that test cases are executed with relevant, consistent, and readily available data, reducing variability in test results and supporting reproducibility across test cycles.

== Importance ==
The role of test data management has expanded with the growth of complex, data-driven systems, agile software development, DevOps, continuous testing, and regulatory requirements governing data usage. Modern software development practices rely on test data being consistently available for manual and automated testing, often as part of continuous integration and deployment workflows.

Testing often depends on data that reflects real-world conditions, but the direct use of production data may introduce security and privacy risks. As a result, organizations apply methods such as data masking, anonymization, and other data protection techniques to meet compliance requirements, including those set by the California Privacy Rights Act (CPRA) and Europe's General Data Protection Regulation (GDPR).

Inadequate control of test data can lead to incomplete test coverage, unreliable test results, false positives, false negatives, and delays in testing caused by unavailable or inconsistent datasets. TDM is also important for test automation, where tests often require data to be in a known state before execution and restored or refreshed between test cycles.

== Techniques and tools ==
Test data management uses various techniques for preparing, protecting, and delivering data for software testing. These include the generation of synthetic data, extraction of subsets from production datasets, modification of data to remove or obscure sensitive information, and provisioning of prepared datasets to test environments.

Sensitive data discovery is often used to identify personal, confidential, or regulated information before applying protection techniques. Data masking replaces or transforms sensitive values so that data can be used in non-production environments while reducing privacy risks. Related techniques include anonymization and pseudonymization, which modify identifying information while allowing data to remain useful for testing purposes. Anonymization permanently removes or alters identifying information so that individuals can no longer be identified, while pseudonymization replaces identifiers with artificial values but may still allow re-identification when additional information is available.

Data subsetting involves extracting smaller datasets from larger source systems for use in testing. Subsets can reduce storage requirements and focus testing on specific scenarios while preserving relationships between related records. Maintaining referential integrity is a key requirement when masking or subsetting data, as relationships between entities must remain consistent across tables and systems.

Synthetic test data generation creates artificial datasets for testing. Synthetic data may be used when production data is unavailable, unsuitable, or cannot be used because of privacy restrictions. It can also support testing of edge cases, high-volume scenarios, and new functionality that does not yet have corresponding production data.

Test data provisioning involves delivering prepared datasets to test environments. Provisioning may be performed manually or automated through APIs and CI/CD pipelines. TDM processes may also include refreshing environments, restoring data to known states, reserving datasets for specific tests, and aging data to simulate time-based conditions.

Data virtualization is another approach that provides access to test data without requiring complete physical copies of datasets. These techniques are commonly implemented through software tools that automate data preparation, masking, provisioning, and management of test environments.

== Architectural approaches ==
Test data management can be implemented using different architectural approaches. A traditional approach involves copying production data into non-production environments, where it can be masked, subsetted, refreshed, and reused for testing. This approach provides production-like datasets but may require additional storage, governance, and data refresh processes.

Another approach is data virtualization, which provides access to data through a virtual layer instead of creating complete physical copies, reducing duplication and supporting access across multiple data sources. An emerging approach organizes test data around business entities or business objects, such as customers, accounts, orders, or policies, rather than database structures. This allows testers to request data using business concepts while preserving related records required for end-to-end testing scenarios.

Organizations may also use hybrid approaches that combine copied datasets, data subsets, synthetic data, virtualization, and automated provisioning depending on testing requirements.

== Enterprise test data management ==
Enterprise test data management addresses the challenges of preparing and managing test data in large organizations, where required datasets may be distributed across multiple applications, databases, cloud platforms, and other systems. In these environments, TDM processes must coordinate data preparation across heterogeneous systems while preserving relationships, constraints, and business rules needed for realistic testing. Enterprise implementations may also include governance capabilities such as access control, approval workflows, auditing, data classification, and integration with software development and testing processes.

== Challenges ==
Common challenges in test data management include translating test cases into specific data requirements, discovering and protecting sensitive data, and maintaining referential integrity across related records and systems. Organizations may also need to preserve data realism while applying masking or anonymization techniques, generate edge and negative test scenarios, and coordinate test data across distributed environments. Other challenges include refreshing environments without disrupting testing activities, reserving data for isolated test execution, restoring data to known states, aging data for time-based scenarios, and supporting automated tests with repeatable datasets.

== Test data management in DevOps and CI/CD ==
In DevOps and CI/CD environments, test data may need to be prepared, refreshed, and delivered automatically as part of software development and testing workflows. Manual preparation of test data can slow automated testing processes and continuous delivery. Modern TDM practices therefore emphasize automation, repeatability, API-based provisioning, integration with test automation tools, and the ability to restore known data states to support reliable testing across development, testing, and other non-production environments.

== Test data management in AI-assisted development ==
The use of artificial intelligence in software development has increased interest in automated approaches to test data preparation and validation. AI-assisted tools that generate code or test cases require suitable datasets for testing, including prepared, masked, or synthetic data. TDM processes may support these workflows by providing consistent test data while maintaining data quality and privacy requirements.

== See also ==
- Software testing
- Test automation
- Test case (software)
- Data masking
- Synthetic data
- Data anonymization
- Pseudonymization
- DevOps
- Continuous integration
- Continuous delivery
