= Fibertel =

Argentinian internet service provider

- Company type: Private
- Industry: Telecommunications
- Founded: 1997
- Defunct: October 4, 2021
- Area served: Argentina (65 cities),
- Services: Internet service provider by cable modem
- Owner: Telecom Argentina
- Number of employees: 8,400

Fibertel was an Argentine Internet service provider. It worked as a stand-alone organization until 2003, when it was merged with Cablevisión, a cable television provider. Cablevisión was part of the Grupo Clarín, thus Fibertel became part of it. Fibertel has over a million clients, and it is the third ISP of the country. In 2018, Cablevisión, including Fibertel, merged with Telecom Argentina.

== History ==
Fibertel started working in 1997, giving service of cable modem. This gave it an edge over contemporary ISP, many of which provided Dial-up Internet access. It was bought in 2003 by Cablevisión, a cable television provider. Cablevisión would be bought later by the Grupo Clarín.
