= Telefónica Argentina =

Argentine telecommunications company

Telefónica Móviles Argentina S.A.

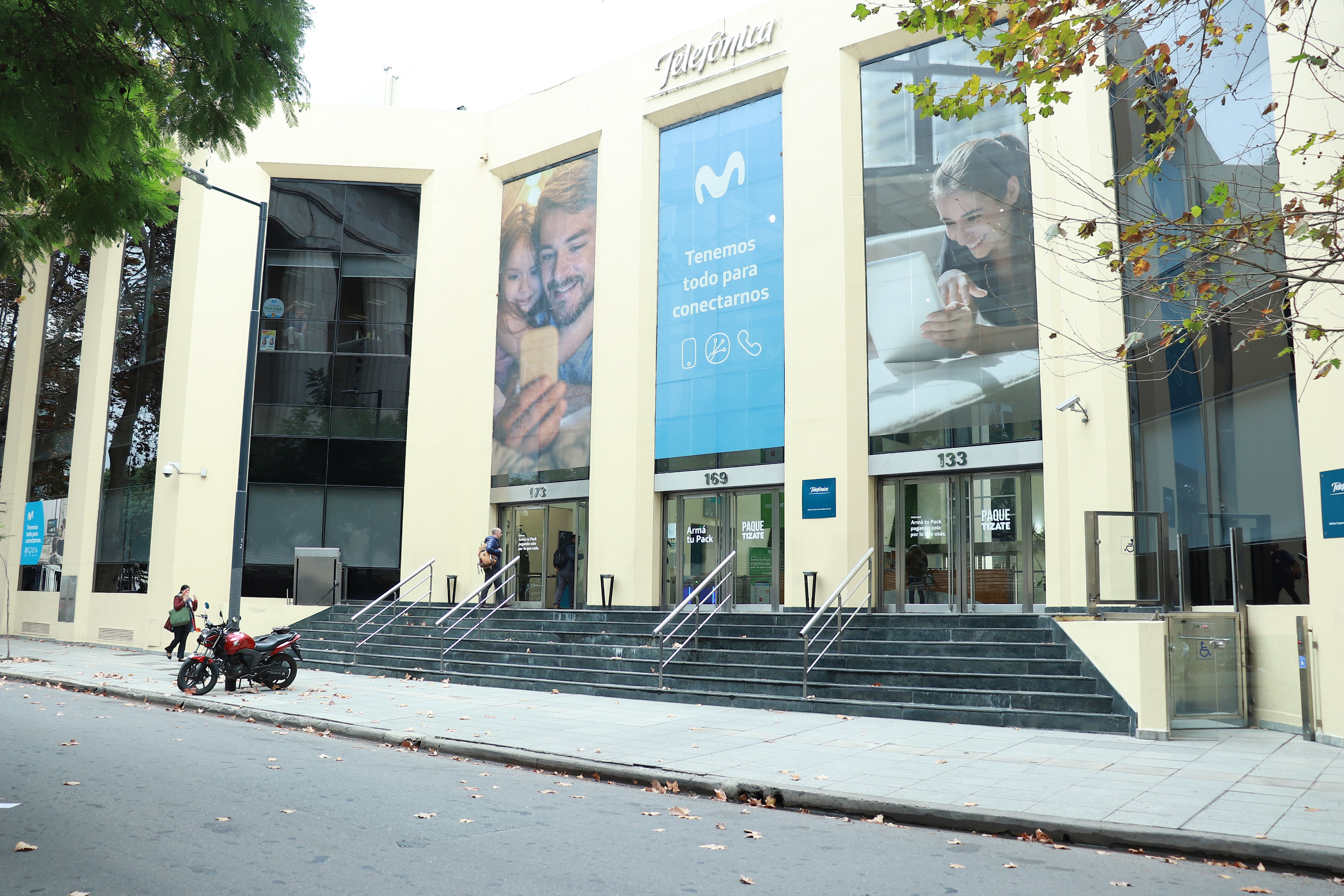
- Headquarters in Buenos Aires, Argentina.
- Type: Public
- ISIN: ES0178430E18
- Industry: Telecommunications
- Founded: 13 July 1990; 36 years ago
- Headquarters: Argentina
- Area served: Argentina
- Key people: Gabriel Speratti (chairman and CEO)
- Products: Fixedline telephony; Mobile telephony; Broadband internet; Digital television
- Revenue: ▼€39.2 billion (2021)
- Operating income: ▲€13.5 billion (2021)
- Net income: ▲€10.7 billion (2021)
- Total assets: ▲€109.2 billion (2021)
- Total equity: ▲€28.6 billion (2021)
- Number of employees: 104,150 (2021)
- Subsidiaries: Movistar
- Website: telefonica.com.ar

Telefónica Argentina is a telecommunications company, a subsidiary of Telefónica Group, founded in 1990 after the privatization of the National Telecommunications Company (ENTel).

On February 24, 2025, Telefónica Hispanoamérica reached an agreement with Telecom Argentina to sell all of its shares in Telefónica Argentina. The transaction is valued at US$1.245 billion.

Likewise, since the approval of the purchase is still being disputed by the Argentine government, it was revealed in September 2025 that Telecom Argentina is in negotiations with Telefónica to extend the use of its brands in Argentina, mainly Movistar.

== Operations ==
Telefónica Argentina is divided into different departments or subsidiaries into which the activities carried out by the company are distributed:

- Telefónica Empresas Argentina, voice, data communications and Internet support for companies in Argentina under the corporate name Telefónica Data de Argentina S.A.
- Movistar Argentina, national and international landline telephony, mobile telephony, TV and Internet access under the Movistar and Tuenti brand. Legally Telefónica Móviles Argentina S.A. * Pléyade Argentina, insurance administrator of the Telefónica Group in Argentina.
- Fundación Telefónica Argentina, Social collaboration with individuals and corporations in search of solutions.

It is currently one of the two largest telephone and Internet service operators in the country, along with its main competitor (until 2025) and current parent company, Telecom Argentina.
