= ENTel =

Empresa Nacional de Telecomunicaciones (ENTel)

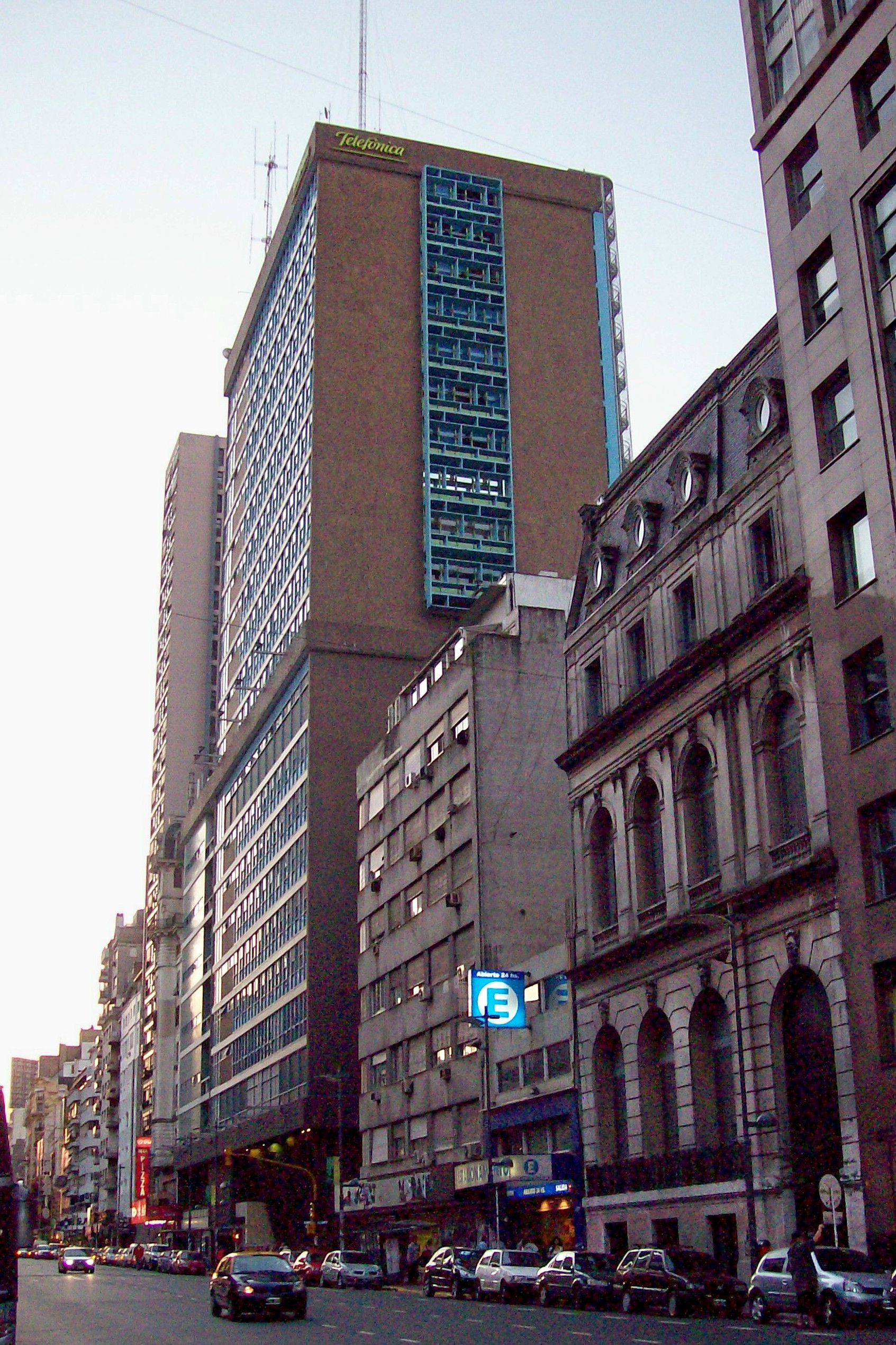
- Edificio República, ENTel headquarters
- Type: State-owned
- Industry: Telecommunications
- Predecessor: Teléfonos del Estado (1946–56)
- Founded: 1956
- Founder: Government of Argentina
- Defunct: 1990; 36 years ago
- Successor: Telecom Argentina; Telefónica de Argentina
- Headquarters: Buenos Aires, Argentina
- Area served: Argentina
- Services: Telephone; Telegraphy; Wireless telegraphy
- Owner: Government of Argentina
- Number of employees: 45,000

The Empresa Nacional de Telecomunicaciones (National Telecommunications Enterprise, mostly known for its acronym ENTel) was an Argentine state-owned enterprise which had the monopoly on public telecommunications in the country.

Originally set-up in 1956 during the government of de facto President Pedro Eugenio Aramburu after the nationalization of all the assets and services of the private companies that had operated Argentina's telephone services until that point carried out by Juan Perón. In 1990, the company was liquidated under the Carlos Menem's administration that privatised most of public services and companies in the country, with Telecom and Telefónica taking over the telephone services previously managed by ENTel.

== History ==
In 1946, the Government of Argentina acquired the "Compañía Unión Telefónica del Río de la Plata" that managed the entire telecommunications industry in the country, subsequently creating the "Empresa Mixta Telefónica Argentina" (EMTA) that mixed state-owned and private investments. Nevertheless, president of Argentina Juan Perón dissolved the mixed society therefore EMTA became a whole state-owned company through decree nº 8.104. The company was renamed "Teléfonos del Estado" in 1949.

During the following decade, based on the financing of the national State, the service expanded significantly, with the installation of new lines and local exchanges, and the integration of the network, through new trunk lines. On this structure, in 1956, under the government of Revolución Libertadora, "Empresa Nacional de Teléfonos" (State Telephones) or "ENTel" was established through decree nº 310. The company provided telephone, telegraphy, and wireless telegraphy services.

ENTel oversaw an expansion and modernisation of the country's telecommunications, but with arrival of the military dictatorship of 1976-83 began a period of stagnation which had an adverse effect on the quality of service and on waiting lists for service and repairs, to the point that to get a phone line had to wait up to 15 years. The Raúl Alfonsín administration attempted to modernize and expand service at ENTel with the Megatel plan, though the effort was ultimately hampered by the company's financial difficulties, which included losses of half a million dollars daily, and debts of over US$370 million.

Access to telephone service in Argentina remained low in comparison with nations of similar income level, with around 3.5 million lines for 8.5 million households, as well as antiquated, as seven out of eight units were rotary phones. The company, in 1990, was among the first proposed for privatization during the government of President Carlos Menem.

== Privatization ==
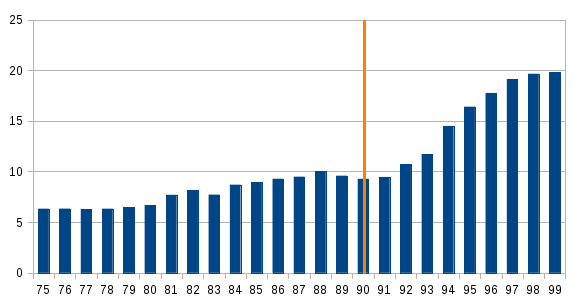
Fixed phone subscriptions per 100 people between 1975 and 1999. The orange line indicates the privatization of ENTel

ENTel was privatised by being split into two companies: Sociedad Licenciataria Norte S.A. and Sociedad Licenciataria Sur S.A.. These, in turn, were sold to France Télécom and Telefónica de España (both State enterprises themselves, at the time) during a 1990 bidding process presided over by Menem's appointed receiver, María Julia Alsogaray. Upon their transfer, these entities became known as Telecom Argentina and Telefónica de Argentina, respectively. The total value of the sale reached US$7.3 billion, and included the retirement of US$5 billion in foreign debt.

Purchasing a divided national phone market along roughly equal sides of a north–south line, each company was given an initial, 7 year monopoly beginning November 8, 1990. At the same time, other companies were given exclusive licences for international long distance, telex and cellular phone service. ENTel remained in existence for a number of years as a residuary body, running off existing contracts and completing the details of its sale.
