= Telecom Argentina =

Argentine telecommunications company

Telecom Argentina S.A

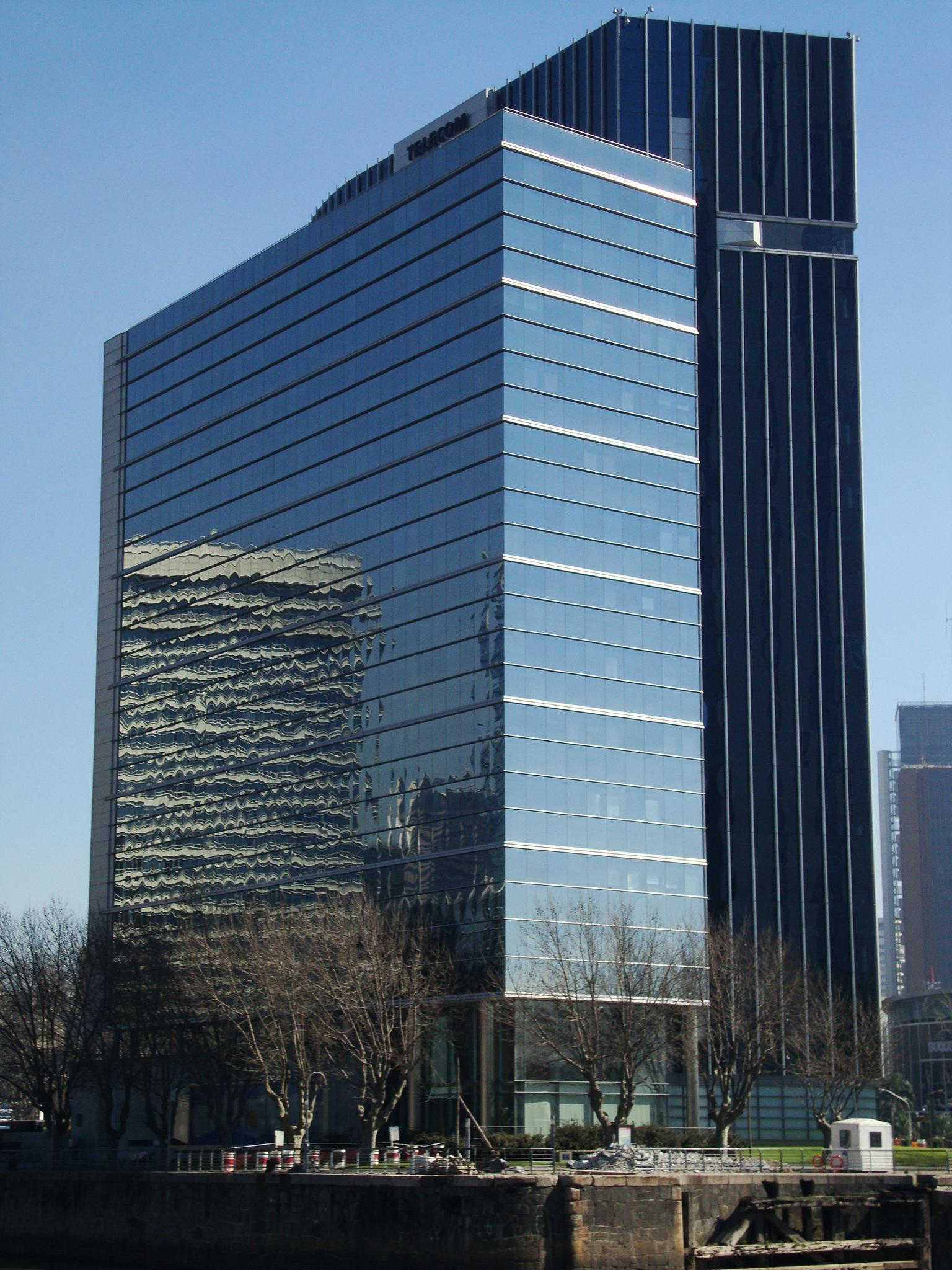
- Telecom building in Buenos Aires.
- Company type: Public
- Traded as: BCBA: TECO2; NYSE: TEO; MERVAL component
- Industry: Telecommunications
- Predecessor: ENTel
- Founded: 1990; 36 years ago
- Headquarters: Buenos Aires, Argentina
- Key people: Roberto Nobile (CEO); Mariano Ibáñez (president)
- Products: Telecommunications services
- Brands: Fibertel (–2021); Flow; Personal
- Revenue: ▲ARS 237.000.000.000 (2019)
- Owner: Clarín Group (33%); Fintech (41,2%) (Note: Grupo Clarín's company Cablevisión and Telecom merged in 2017, with "Cablevisión Holding" (a spin-off from the conglomerate) owning the 33% of the recently formed company.)
- Number of employees: 23,415 (1H 2020)
- Website: telecom.com.ar

Telecom Argentina S.A. operating commercially under the brand name Personal is the major local telephone company for the northern part of Argentina, including the whole of the city of Buenos Aires. Briefly known as Sociedad Licenciataria Norte S.A., it quickly changed its name, and is usually known as simply "Telecom" within Argentina.

Together with Telefónica de Argentina in the southern part of the country, was part of the national fixed telephone market duopoly, until 8 October 1999. Telecom also operates the mobile phone service Personal, the cable modem service Arnet-Fibertel and the cable operator Cablevisión, now under the brand "Flow".

In December 2025, the company announced that it would unify its brand and operate as Personal, while maintaining its corporate name as Telecom Argentina S.A.

== History ==
In 1990, Argentina started to privatize most of its state-owned utilities: power, water, trains, and telecommunications, just to name a few. The monopoly of state-owned phone service ENTel was split into two territories: Stet International (the previous name of Telecom Italia and France Télécom was given the "upper half" of the country, from the middle to the north, and Telefónica was given the southern part). Each company was given an initial 7 year monopoly beginning on November 8, 1990. Initially, other companies were given exclusive licenses for international long distance, as well as cellular phone service. Telecom Italia and France Télécom later sold its part of the company to the Argentine Werthein Group.

Its Puerto Madero headquarters were designed by the American architectural studio of Kohn Pedersen Fox, and inaugurated on February 18, 1998.

Both local phone companies turned their systems into profitable operations in just a few years, despite the terrible conditions they inherited from ENTel. In the worst years of ENTel, a line activation would take several years. The telephone wiring layout across the country was undocumented. At privatization in 1990, the wait was still four years to get new service and forty days for repair.

Starting off Telecom Argentina invested into the country and during the first 8 years of strong investment in infrastructure deployment at a rate a little less than a billion u$s per year, with a complete restructuring of the copper access network and the deployment of one of the most advanced and large deployment of SDH long-distance fiber network at those times 2.5 Gbit/s networks, and the upgrade of almost all central offices, most of them electromechanical and also some manual small exchanges. Some years later, all of the phone network was upgraded to a state-of-the-art system, from central telephone exchanges up to the wires going into homes; by 2005, 98% of the ENTel network infrastructure had been replaced.

In 2005, the Bank of New York was appointed as trustee, registrar and paying and transfer agent for Telecom Argentina's $1.5 billion debt restructuring, the biggest Argentine debt restructuring to date. The restructure involved the exchange of $2.8 billion in outstanding debt for newly issued exchange notes and cash, and involved consent requests and instructions for over 1100 creditors.

On October 19, 2008, following difficulties, the company announced it was suspending the repayment of its debt, which at the time exceeded 3.3 billion dollars.

In 2017, Telecom merged with Clarín Group's Cablevisión so the new company became the largest mass media enterprise of Argentina. The merger was approved by the Government of Argentina in June 2018. After that operation, the group entered into the internet access and mobile telephony business.

The Arnet brand, operated by Telecom, was rebranded as Fibertel Lite in March 2019.

== Personal ==
"Telecom Personal", owned by Telecom Argentina, is one of only 3 mobile phone companies in Argentina. Personal used a similar logo to Telecom itself until November 2011, when they switched into a new handwritten logo combined with nine brand colors.

Telecom Personal owns 67.5% of Paraguayan mobile provider Núcleo S.A., which started in 1998 and also does business under the brand name Personal.

Telecom Argentina has agreed with Uruguayan state telcom ANTEL to operate as a reseller of Antel services in that country. Mexican mobile phone Claro has asked the national telecommunications regulating entity not to allow Personal to arrive to Uruguay.

== Ownership ==
As of 2019, current approximate ownership of Telecom Argentina is:

- 31.53% Fintech Telecom LLC
- 18.75% Cablevisión Holding S.A. (CVH)
- 20.06% VLG S.A.U.
- 29.65% publicly traded
- 0.01% Class C shares

== Criticism ==
Previous logo, used from 1998 until 2021

Critics of Telecom argue that, when it received government subsidies to provide service in remote areas, it either didn't provide the service, or just installed public telephones. Critics also point to the high prices charged by the company, and to the fact that, unlike much of the world, Argentine customers have to pay per minute, rather than a fixed price.

In contrast, defendants of the system point out that the 011 area code (called AMBA, most of Gran Buenos Aires) provides local phone access to five to six million users (15-16% of the total population of the country), making a flat-rate type of service economically impossible.

Due to the lack of long requested flat telephone rates for local calls, especially to connect to Internet, a lot of users installed ADSL services from Arnet, Telecom's Internet service provider. The company was heavily criticised when it decided to limit ADSL users to 4 GB per month and charge for extra traffic, a decision which was promptly reversed.

Other critics to the company are centred on the lack of information on their offers, and obscure contracts with prices not including taxes, and other important information.

== See also ==
- Argentine telephone numbering plan
- Communications in Argentina
- Telecentro
