= Internet in Chile =

The Internet in Chile has its roots in experimental tests conducted in 1986 between the Universidad de Chile and the Universidad de Santiago de Chile, the two main public universities in the country. Its commercialization began in the mid-1990s, and it experienced widespread adoption in the second half of the 2000s. Before this, Chile had previously attempted the Cybersyn project in 1971, which aimed to establish an almost real-time economic information transfer system with the government, but it did not succeed.

As of 2023 the Internet has become an essential part of Chilean society, with an estimated 17.69 million people, equivalent to 90.2% of the national population, having access to an Internet connection. These connections are provided entirely by the private sector and are available in various technologies such as hybrid fiber-coaxial, fiber to the home, mobile broadband, satellite Internet, and xDSL, offering a wide range of speeds and costs.

To facilitate international communication, Chile relies mainly on five submarine cables situated at different points along the national territory. These cables include the Pan-American (PanAm) cable through Arica, the South America-1 (SAm-1) cable through Arica and Valparaíso, the South American Crossing (SAC)/Latin American Nautilus (LAN) cable through Valparaíso, the Google Curie cable through Valparaíso, and the Cable Mistral through Arica and Valparaíso.

The technical regulation of the Internet in Chile falls under the purview of the Chilean Ministry of Transport and Telecommunications, which operates through the Undersecretariat of Telecommunications (Subtel). Additionally, the country code top-level domain for Chile is .cl, and its administration is managed by the Universidad de Chile through NIC Chile.

== History ==
=== Initial attempts and Cybersyn ===
Before the introduction of the internet in Chile, the country communicated abroad via Letters, the Correos de Chile service had been started by Chile in 1747 (when it was still part of the Spanish crown) it was not until 1851 that a telegraphy service began for communication with the outside world, initially in 1851 wired and officially wireless since 1904 (with a certain role being played by the Vía Trans Radio Chilena Compañía de Radiotelegrafía, which would become later in VTR), later communication with the outside arose via Telephone -whose implementation had begun in Valparaíso in 1878 by Compañía Chilena de Telefonos de Edison -which in 1930 would become the Compañía Telefónica de Chile-

Perhaps the closest previous experience to the contemporary internet was the development of Cybersyn, in 1970 the world was experiencing the Cold War and Chile was led by a government that sought to establish a socialist state, After nationalizing and annexing various socially owned companies to the State, the Allende government's economic system faced the need to coordinate information on existing state-owned companies and those recently nationalized. To achieve this, it was necessary to create a dynamic and flexible information transfer system, a task carried out by a British scientist the architect of systems Stafford Beer.

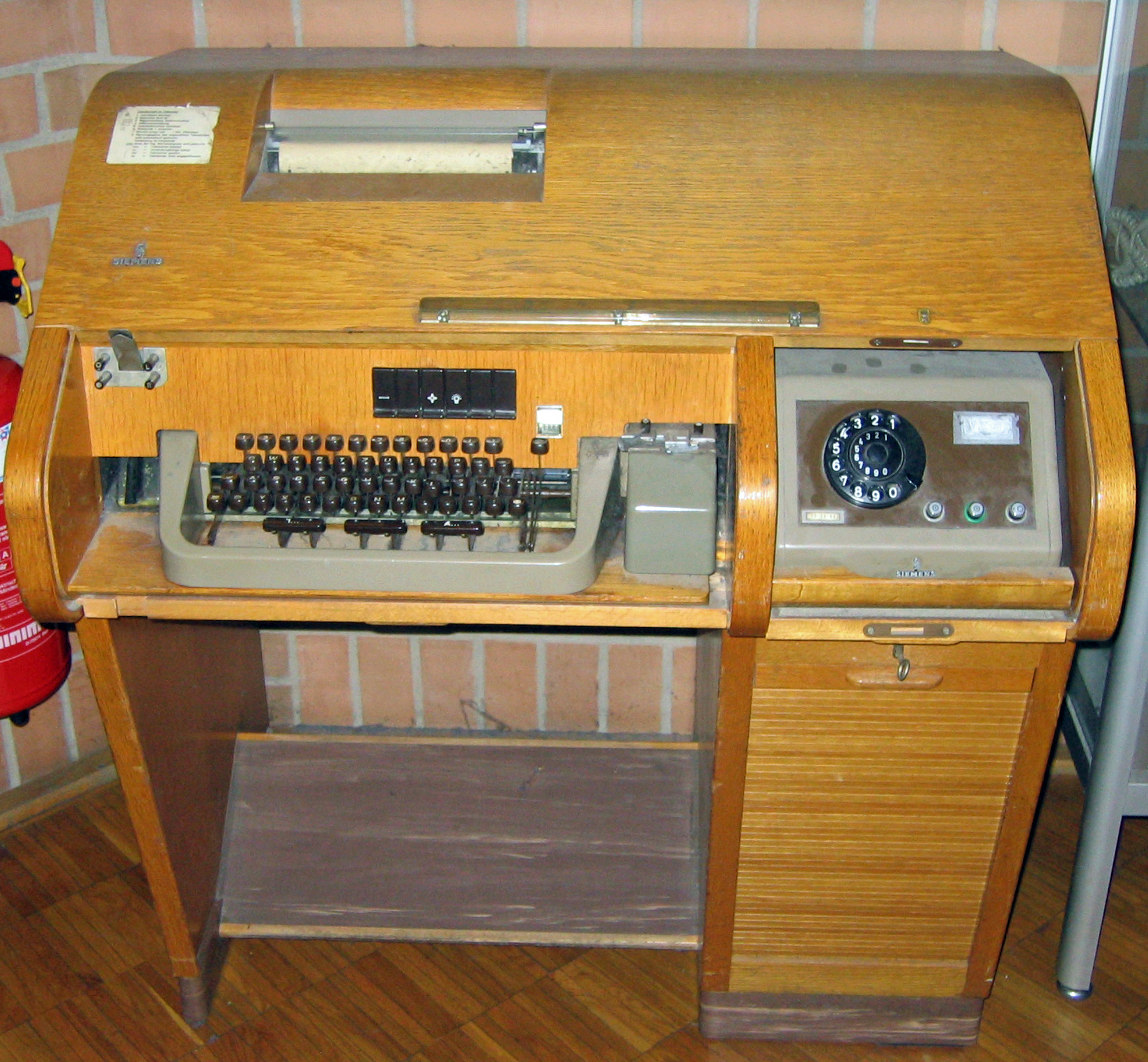
Teletypes were telegraph devices for data transmission, which the government of Salvador Allende intended to use to coordinate information from recently expropriated companies with the central government.

Since there were 500 unused teletypes, all of them acquired during the government of Eduardo Frei Montalva, each one of the machines was installed in an expropriated factory. At the control center in Santiago, a computer daily processed the information received from the factories. By processing such information, short-term predictions and recommendations for improvements were obtained. There were four levels of control (company, branch, sector and total) that had algedonic feedback (if the lower level of control could not solve a problem in a given time interval, the higher level was notified about it). The results were discussed in the operating room and an overall plan was drawn up.

The network was built between November 1971 and the same month of 1972, although it was never fully completed. The system was used experimentally in October 1972, during the October 1972 strike, when 50 000 unemployed truckers blocked the streets of Santiago. Using teletype machines, the government was able to coordinate the transport of food to the city with the approximately 200 trucks loyal to Allende and who were not unemployed.

With the 1973 Chilean coup d'état, the control center was destroyed, documents and existing telephone and teletype infrastructure were destroyed, Cybersyn could never be applied and was irrevocably aborted, additionally with the change of Cold War bloc by the Government Junta of Chile (1973), which advocated for a free market, a network for running a Self-managed economy made no sense.

=== The university network ===
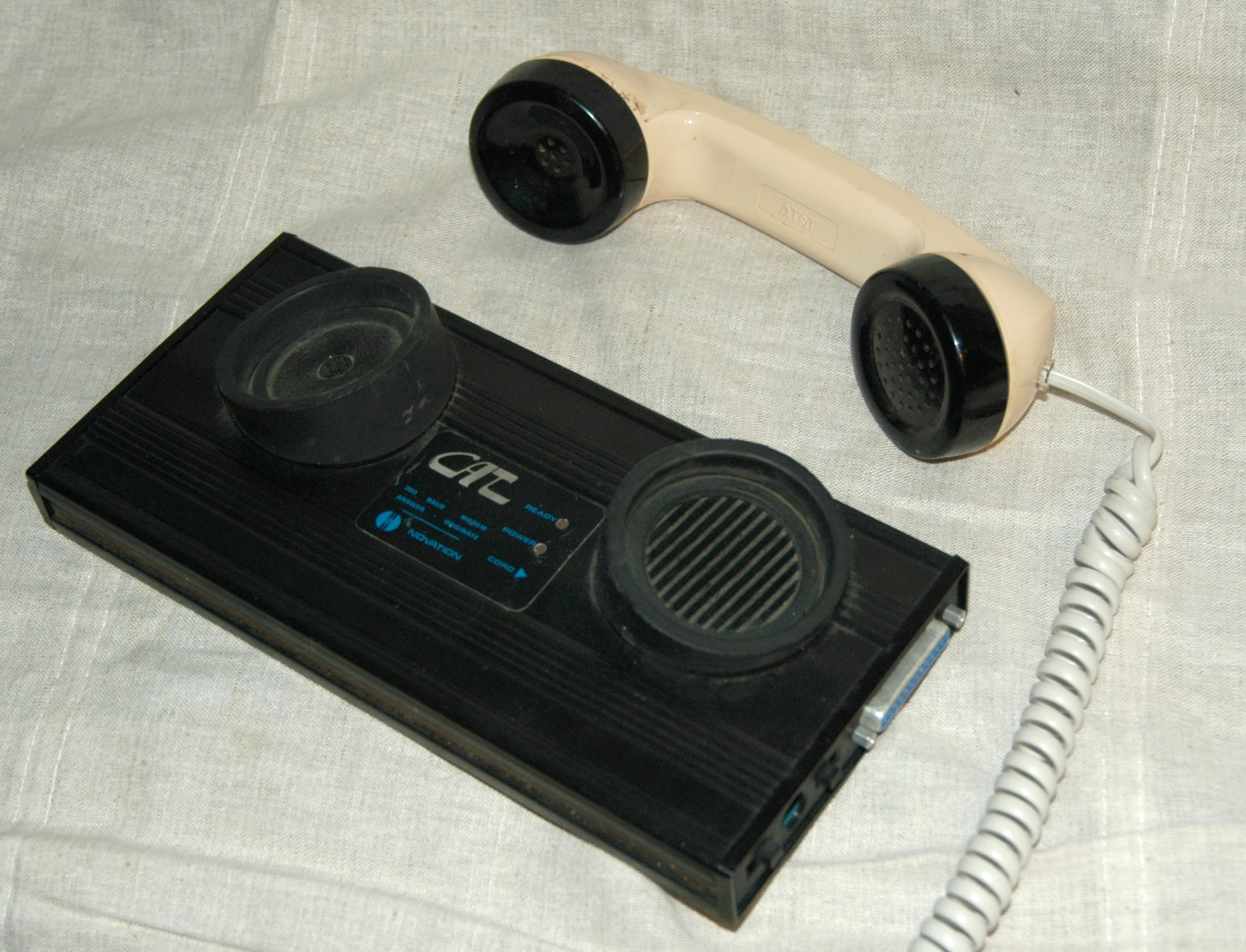
The Novation CAT acoustically coupled modem

The Internet in Chile as we know it dates back to the ARPANET project. In 1972 the universities of the United States copied the ARPANET model and implemented it to exchange opinions among themselves and support themselves in their academic research. However, this development was not copied in Chile until 1986, when the Department of Computer Science of the University of Chile and the Department of Computer Engineering of the University of Santiago de Chile carried out some tests through a UUCP platform and mailings between them using 300-bit modems and the CTC telephone line (which at that time had national coverage), imitating a sort of Intranet model.

It was not until 1987 when Dr. Florencio Utreras (of the Universidad de Chile) connected the country with BITNET, which was an academic network of the City University of New York and Yale University, giving rise to the Internet in Chile.

Subsequently, the University of Santiago abandoned the collaboration and joined the Pontificia Universidad Católica (PUC). In its beginnings, the Internet worked between local universities and with some universities abroad using modems and pre-existing telephone lines of the only telephone company in Chile. The domain .cl was given in 1986 to the Department of Computer Sciences (DCC) of the University of Chile and later began to be managed by NIC Chile, beginning to be commercialized only in the year 1997.

=== The commercialization of 56k and ADSL ===
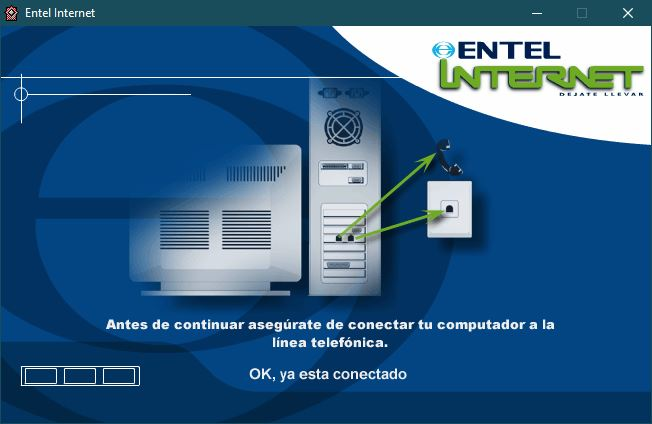
The setup wizard for Entel's 56k connection during the 1990s

Only in 1993 did the commercialization of the Internet begin in Chile, the then CTC (Compañía de Telefonos de Chile) acquired the technology from the University of Chile, while the technology from the Catholic University of Chile passed by various private owners until today it became Claro Chile.

The then CTC (Compañía de Telefonos de Chile) using its existing telephone network, launched the service of Dial-up Internet access in 1993 (with maximum speeds of 56 Kilobit per second), which had some peculiarities: It was not possible to use the telephone line and navigate at the same time, and there was no local connection, so traffic between users of both networks had to navigate to US and return with the service being billed per second of access and as international long distance, which made the service exclusive to a large part of the population.

Additionally, the majority of the population did not see the Internet as very useful. Outside of the academic environment, there was no interest in the Internet in Chilean society.

During the 1990s, telephone companies and long-distance carriers began to offer Internet connection services to the mass public.

The massiveness of the Internet in Chile began in 1997 and is essentially due to the creation of NAP Chile and a decree of the Chilean Government, which changed the form of Internet billing, which allowed between 1998 and 1999 to increase both Internet users, which tripled; as well as the number of minutes they used per month.

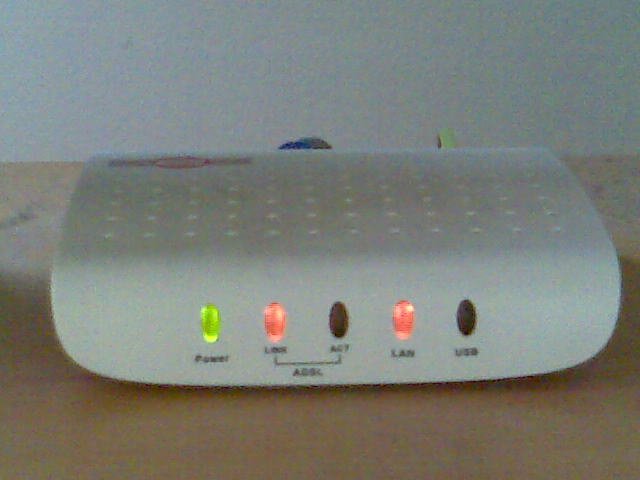
ADSL router like the ones Telefónica Chile used during the 2000s

In 1997 several Chilean ISPs associated to form a local traffic exchange point, called NAP Chile, which allowed it to improve both the traffic latency and the costs of its associated ISPs.

In May 1999, the Chilean government decreed a change in the rates for those who access the Internet using telephone connections, a charging formula called "Local Tranche" would be used. The impact on the cost of use is direct for users, having a 62% decrease compared to the previous year.

One of the main access barriers, which the Internet service had in Chile, was its charge per second of connection. It was towards the beginning of the year 2000 when Entel Chile and Telefónica Chile began to incorporate fixed charge connections in their existing telephone networks technology ADSL, but at private prices for a large part of the population. With this Broadband was born and being able to have high speed was radically changing the impact of the Internet and its possible uses.

=== The development of the HFC network and 3G ===
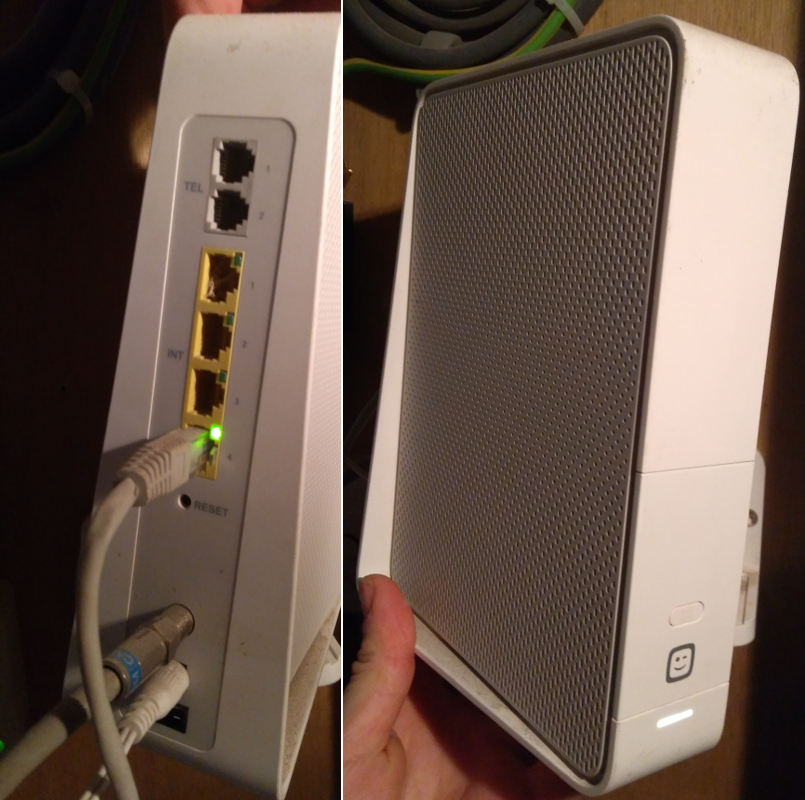
The Cablemodem connection is the most common way to access the Internet today

Around 1996, almost all of the internet in Chile was by Dial-up Internet access. However, a cable television company -Metrópolis (Chile)- on 17 October 1996, put into operation an interactive video game channel called Sega Channel, which allowed the download of content by the company Sega, this being the first Internet experience on the infrastructure of cable television. VTR (Chile) launched Internet commercialization in 1999 under its existing cable television network via the DOCSIS 1.0 standard and under independent connections of the telephone network, at high speed and with differentiated payments not for the amount of time used, conditions not offered by Dial-up Internet access., and that today are the norm for all home internet providers.

However, the infrastructure and access to the Internet via cable modem, was rather modest in its early years. It was only after 2004 when Internet access via Hybrid fiber-coaxial began to become widespread, starting with a commercial strategy by VTR and the launch of its best-known promotion: the Triple Pack, which lowered the cost of contracting telephony, television and internet as a whole, and the merger of VTR with Metrópolis Intercom S.A.

In 2002, the first third-generation networks began to be implemented thanks to the different agreements made abroad by SmartCom and Bellsouth, which allowed them to sell 1xRTT equipment capable of browsing at 150 kbit/s, and with it the debut of the Mobile broadband, which would only begin to spread in the 2010s, with the increase in the issuance of a contract (postpaid), to the detriment of communication through recharges (prepaid), in 2013 the 4G and in 2022, 5G.

=== The development of the FTTH and satellite network ===
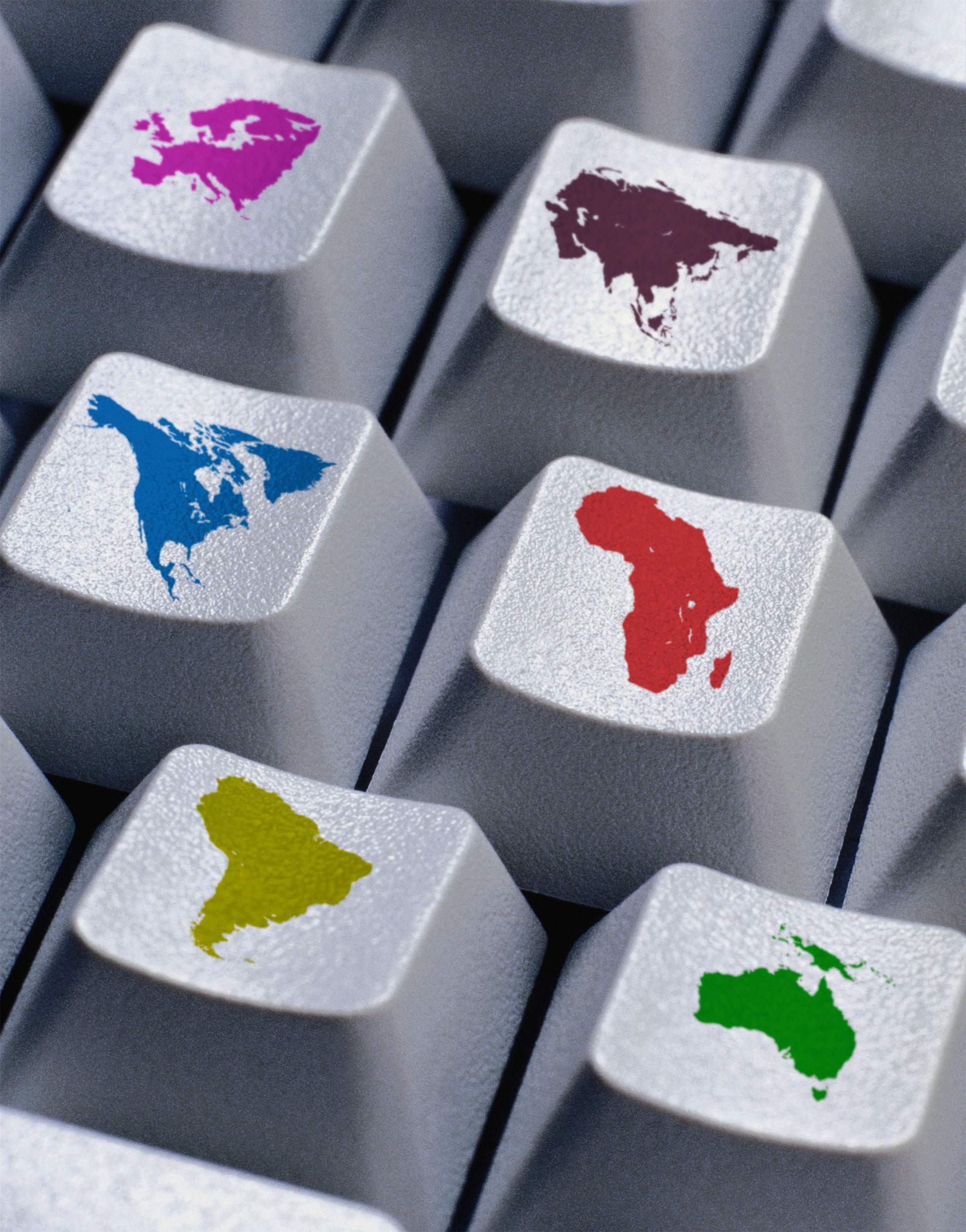
Analysts agree that globalization and the Free Trade Agreements Chile has signed since the 1990s have made the Internet more widespread in Chile and have brought it into the global arena.

The development of the Internet in Chile until 2006 was based on the conversion and reuse of two previously existing technologies in Chile: on the one hand, the telephone line of the Compañía de Telefonos de Chile (which in some sectors dated back to 1880) via digital subscriber line technology and on the other hand the cable television network of VTR (which in some sectors dating back to 1987) via hybrid fiber-coaxial technology. Both had wide coverage in the national territory, but also had important technical limitations (especially the telephone line) in terms of speed, latency and state of the cabling, causing the rapid decline of xDSL networks from 2015 to the present.

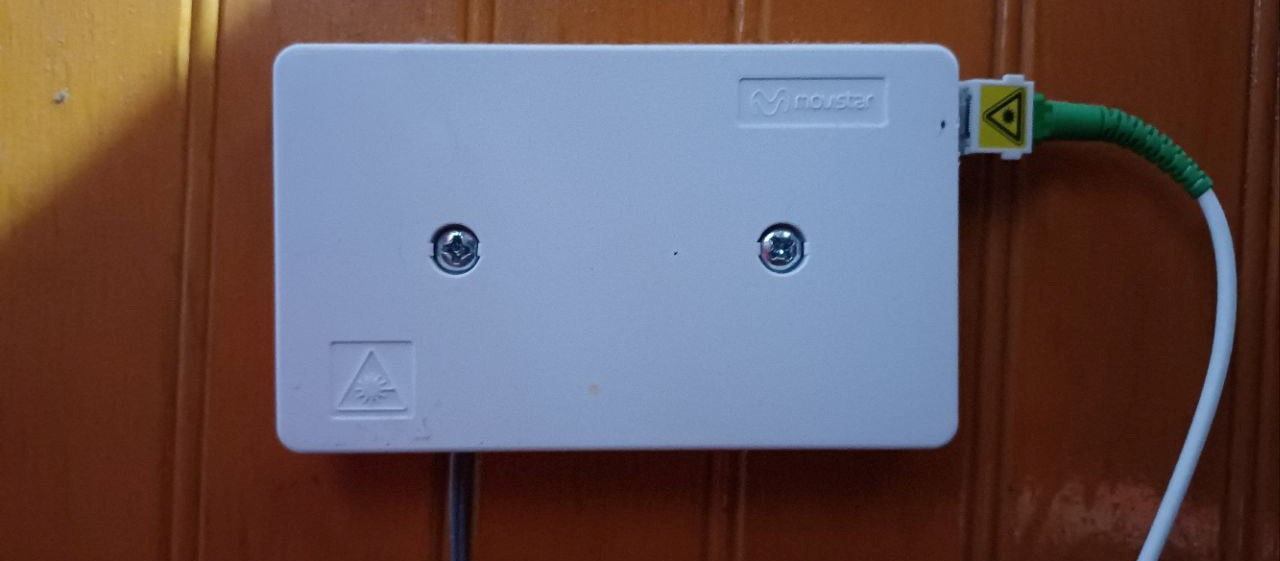
The fiber to the home infrastructure only started in 2006 and is still geographically limited.

Although internet providers via cable television infrastructure began to incorporate new DOCSIS standards and internet providers via Telephone line infrastructure progressively implemented ADSL2 and VDSL2, it was not until 2006 that the company Gtd began the deployment of a new infrastructure to provide internet, based on fiber to the home. Initially, the infrastructure was deployed in sectors residential upper class and with limited geographical coverage, later in 2012 Movistar began the deployment of its new infrastructure of fiber to the home (with special massiveness of deployment since 2020), to which Mundo and Entel joined in 2020, WOM in 2019 and VTR in 2021, the last three with limited geographical coverage.

Residential Satellite Internet in Chile is a rather limited phenomenon, most of its consumers are part of the economic development of the rural areas, the domestic rural areas use mostly Mobile broadband. Since 2014, Movistar markets Satellite Broadband, to which Claro Chile would be added the following year. In 2020 Hughes Communications would begin its commercialization, and the following year Starlink. As of December 2021, it reported more than 1,500 clients.

=== Contemporary Internet ===
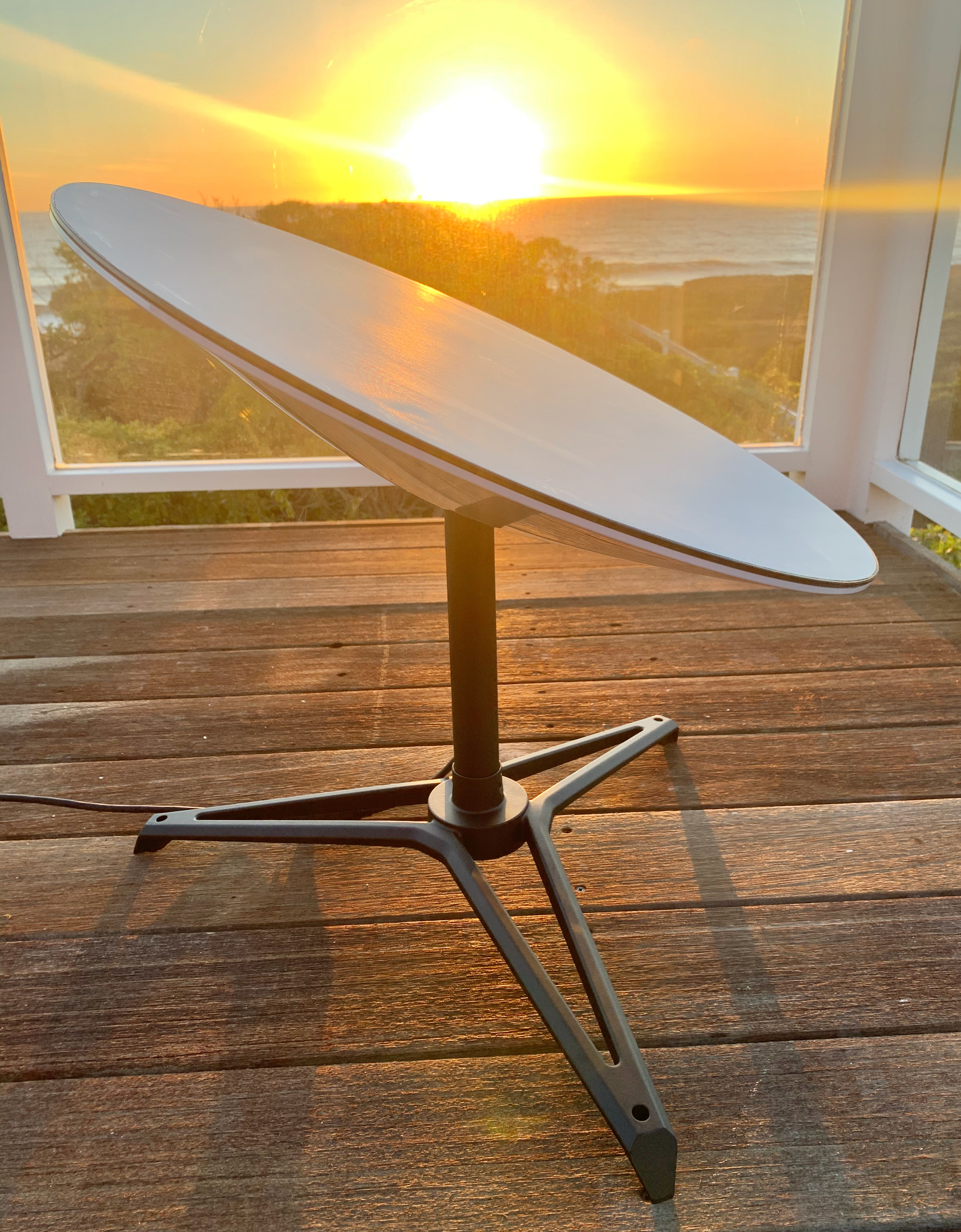
Access to satellite internet in Chile is rather limited; it is mainly used by the productive sector in rural areas.

Since 1999, the Government of Chile has incorporated a successive process of digitalization of its services. In 1999, the Servicio de Impuestos Internos, the government entity in charge of collecting taxes, received almost 90,000 declarations of income through the Internet, of the million total income statements for that year., since the 2010s, a significant number of government procedures have been digitized, in addition to a progressive adoption of the Online banking and Electronic Commerce, coinciding with an accelerated globalization process in Chile from the years 2000.

Analysts point out that a huge percentage of Chilean GDP has grown thanks to the Internet. Mining, agriculture and all traditional companies have been affected by their growth thanks to the Internet. The Internet has freed Chile from its isolated geography and has allowed Chile to insert itself into the world efficiently.

The main internet infrastructure test Chile has experienced was the 2010 Chile Earthquake, which left a massive internet outage and much network infrastructure destroyed -Including a flood of Global Crossing servers-

However, the main agent of change of the Contemporary Internet in Chile was the COVID-19 pandemic, which caused an increase in Internet consumption in Chile that was reflected in the first months of the pandemic, where it was reported that the use of social networks increased by 53% compared to the same month of the previous year, above several other countries in the region.

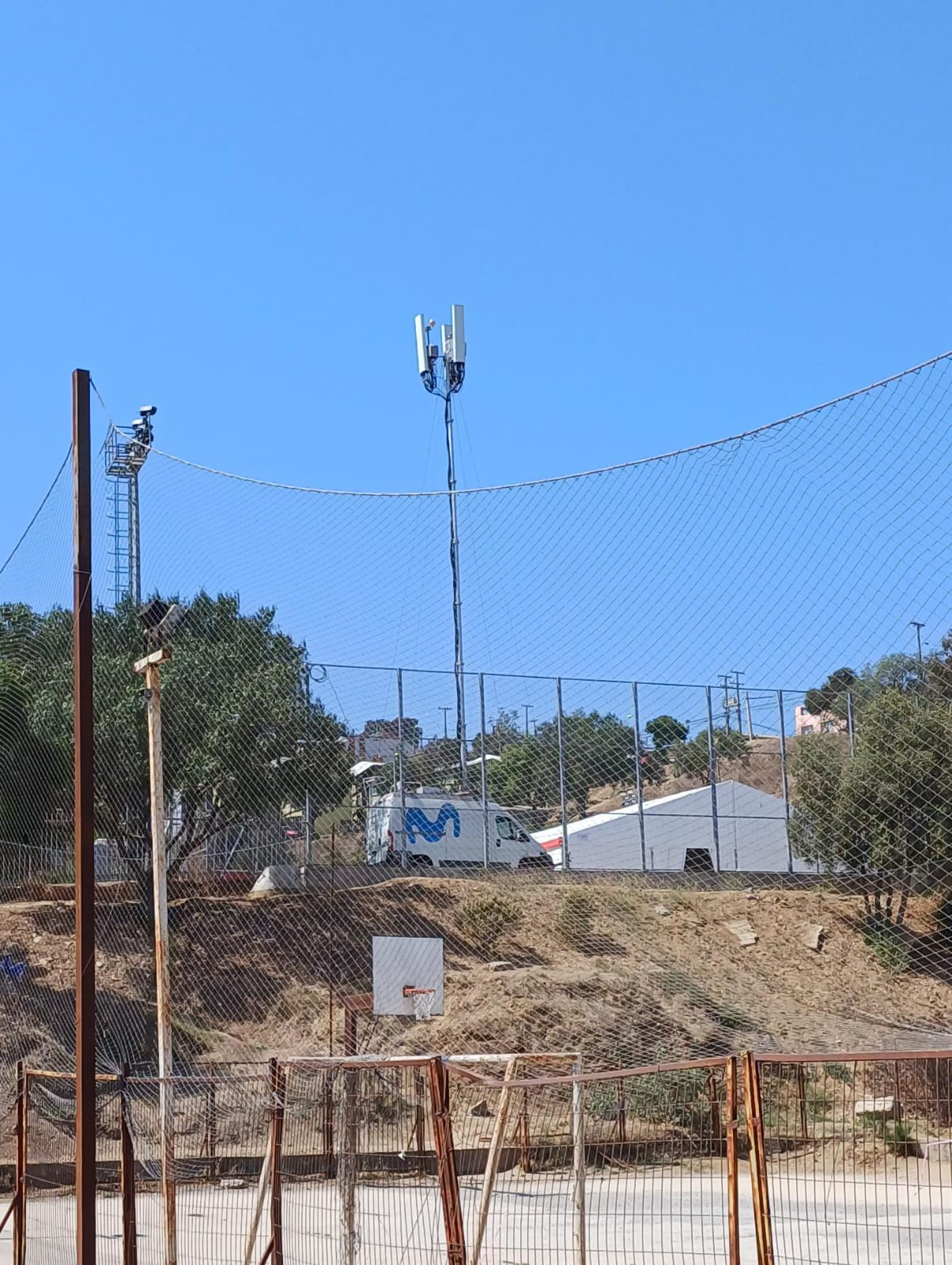
Movistar 4G and 5G mobile repeater antenna, installed in the places damaged by the fire

Data consumption per user reached 335.5 GB on fixed internet in April 2020, 29.4% more than the previous year. Regarding mobile internet consumption, it increased 26% to 13 Gigabytes in the same period, a situation even more accentuated with the COVID-19 lockdowns, where the network was exposed to intensive use, forcing operators to strengthen their existing infrastructure and society and the Government of Chile to digitize many of its benefits, emerging massively Teleworking, Telemedicine, Distance Education, Online banking absolutely, the Judiciary of Chile remotely, the Streaming and other services that are maintained to date.

For the 2024 Chile wildfires in the Valparaíso region, due to the fire, telephone antennas were destroyed, as well as satellite backup systems and several kilometers of trunk and domestic fiber cabling, which added to the power outage widespread due to damage from fires and an unprecedented overload of the fixed and mobile network caused that around 7 p.m. on February 2, 2023, all of Viña del Mar and Quilpué experienced a "blackout" of fixed and mobile internet from all companies, leaving IP Telephony and Transbank out of service (and with this out of service the processing of payment transactions with credit cards, debit banking and prepaid), although internet companies quickly activated National Emergency Automatic Roaming (RAN) (which is essentially automatically sharing their antennas, making communication redundant in case of failure at some point) and portable satellite teleports for the use of Chilean Armed Forces, Carabineros de Chile, Investigations Police of Chile, Firefighters of Chile and the emergency health services, domestic connectivity took several weeks to return to normal. integrity.

== Legal regulation ==
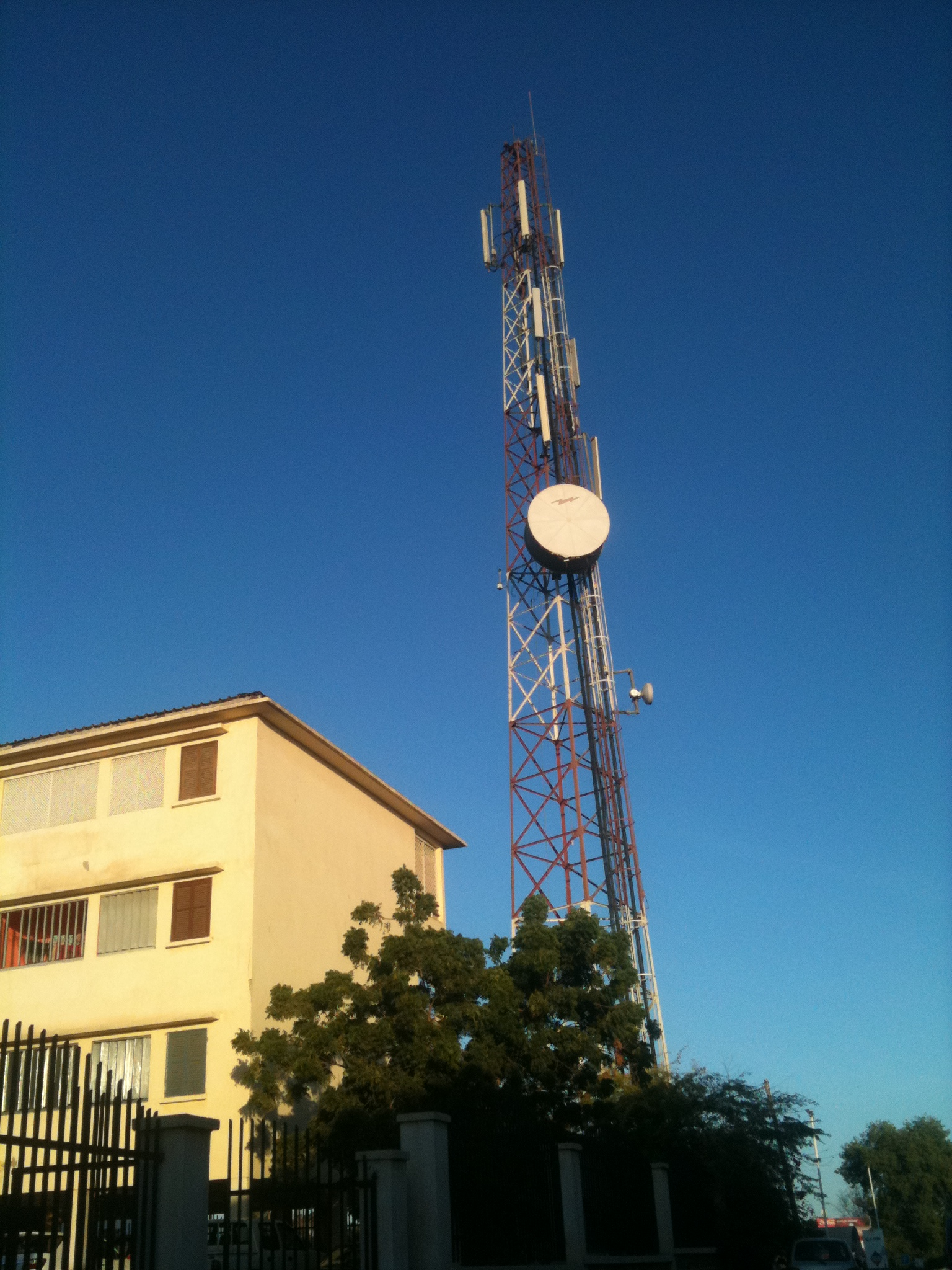
Legally, since 2010, ISPs have been prohibited from blocking, interfering with, discriminating against, hindering, or arbitrarily restricting the activities of Internet users, with the network being neutral.

The control and supervision in the exercise of telecommunications in the country and of the Internet, in Chile is in charge of the Undersecretary of Telecommunications of Chile (also known by its acronym Subtel) reports to the Chilean Ministry of Transport and Telecommunications (MTT).

The main Internet legislation in Chile is the Chilean General Telecommunications Law 18,168, enacted in 1982.

- Internet service providers (ISPs) are defined as "any natural or legal person that provides commercial connectivity services between users or their networks and the Internet".
- The ISPs are free to deploy networks and maintain centers and servers that support their service, however, they must request permission from the municipalities for the deployment of networks that use public lighting.
- The Internet service provider must remove their disused infrastructure and their installation and operation must not mean environmental damage or public health.
- The Internet service provider may freely install antennas, with the only restriction being places where vulnerable people live and with the indicated maximum height and radiation standards.
- The prohibition of arbitrary blocking, interference, discrimination, obstruction and restriction of the activities of Internet users is established. ISPs may take the necessary measures for traffic management and network administration, and must take care of user privacy, virus protection and network security.
- The limitation of the incorporation or use of "any class of instruments, devices or devices in the network" is prohibited, as long as they are legal and do not damage the network.
- The obligation to offer parental controls is established.
- The obligation to "publish on your website, all the information related to the characteristics of the Internet access offered, its speed, quality of the link, differentiating between national and international connections, as well as the nature and guarantees of the service" is established.
- The infrastructure of the Internet service provider is understood as critical infrastructure and has special protection by the Chilean Armed Forces.
- Users own their phone number, being able to access number portability
- Mobile companies must provide roaming service to other companies in remote areas, where many times not all Internet service provider have antennas.

In addition to Chile's General Telecommunications Law 18,168, there are various legal bodies that regulate specific aspects of Internet access:

- Resolution No. 1483 of October 1999. Establishes procedure and term to establish and accept connections between ISPs.
- Resolution No. 698 of June 2000. Sets quality indicators for connection links to carry national Internet traffic and their advertising system.
- Resolution No. 3729 of July 2011. Approves the protocol for the measurement of indicators established in the regulation that regulates the characteristics and conditions of Net Neutrality in the Internet access service.
- Resolution No. 6267 of November 2011. Sets the meaning and scope of Decree No. 368, dated 15 December 2010, regulation that regulates the characteristics and conditions of Net Neutrality in the Internet access service, in the sense which indicates.
- Resolution No. 7268 of December 2011. Modifies the standard of quality indicators for connection links to carry Internet traffic and their advertising system.
- Decree No. 138 dated 13 October 2020 approving the Regulation on automatic roaming and Mobile virtual network operator.
- Law No. 21,398 establishes a series of new rights for consumers shopping online in different areas.
- Law No. 21,220, which modified the Labor Code regarding remote work and teleworking.

=== Network neutrality ===
On 13 June 2010, the National Congress of Chile amended its telecommunications law to preserve network neutrality, becoming the first country in the world to do so. The law, published on 26 August 2010, added three articles to the General Law of Telecommunications, forbidding ISPs from arbitrarily blocking, interfering with, discriminating against, hindering, or restricting an Internet user's right to use, send, receive, or offer any legal content, application, service, or any other type of legal activity or use through the Internet. ISPs must provide Internet access in which content is not arbitrarily treated differently based on its source or ownership.

== Indicators and use ==
=== Penetration ===
- Mobile Internet penetration (%): 136.9% (2022)
- Fixed Broadband Penetration by Households (%): 94.3% (2024)
- Secure servers (HTTPS) on the internet (servers/million pop): 127.6 (47 in the ranking).
- Annual traffic (2024): 32.91 Exabytes (approx. 91.46 Petabytes daily)

=== Market Share by ISP ===
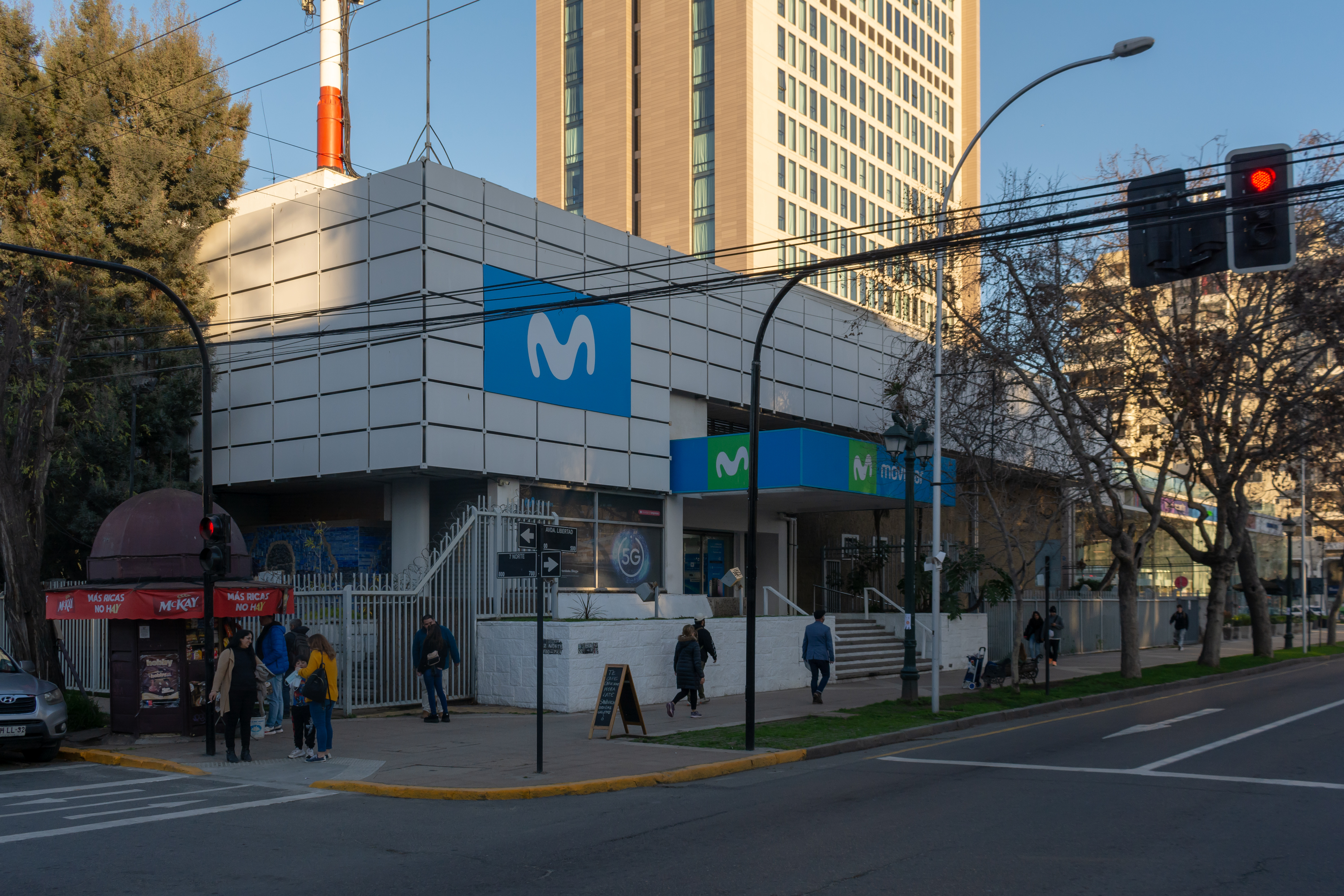
Currently, Movistar (part of the Telefónica Group) holds the largest share of Internet access and manages the highest volume of traffic.

Rank	Internet Service Provider	Technologies Used	Total Annual Traffic	Market Share
#1	Movistar	xDSL (0.33%) and FTTH (99.65%)	8,814 Petabytes (27.69%)	29.4%
#2	VTR	HFC (65.8%) and FTTH (34.2%)	6,716 Petabytes (21.10%)	23.44%
#3	Mundo (World)	FTTH (100%)	7,181 Petabytes (22.54%)	19.75%
#4	Entel	xDSL (2.65%), WiMAX (0.11%) and FTTH (97.24%)	4,004 Petabytes (12.57%)	9.04%
#5	Claro Company	xDSL (0.01%), HFC (91.37%) and FTTH (8.62%)	762 Petabytes (2.39%)	6.67%
#6	WOM	FTTH (100%)	1,380 Petabytes (4.34%)	4.54%
#7	Telsur (Telephonic of the south)	xDSL (4.0%) and FTTH (96%)	1,156 Petabytes (3.63%)	4.53%
#8	GTD Company	xDSL (1.43%) and FTTH (98.57%)	780 Petabytes (2.45%)	2.24%
#9	Starlink	Low orbit satellites (100%)	Unknown	1.49%
#10	Directv	FTTH (100%)	Unknown	0.57%
#11	Others	xDSL, HFC, WiMAX, FTTH or Satellite	552 Petabytes (1.73%)	0.55%

=== Share of web traffic by device ===
- Mobile phones (%): 52.47%
- Computers (%): 46.40%
- Tablets (%): 1.06%
- Other devices (%): 0.06%

=== Consumption of goods through e-commerce ===
- People who buy goods on the Internet: 12.05 million
- Total annual spending (USD): $7.64 billion

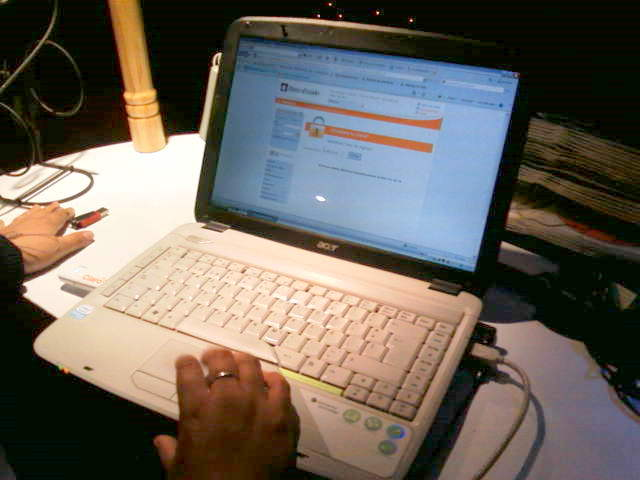
Searching, watching videos, social networks, electronic banking and pornography are the main uses of the Internet in Chile.

=== Most visited websites (February 2025) ===
Rank	Website	Content
1	Google.com	Search engine
2	YouTube	Online video platform
3	Instagram	Social networking service
4	Facebook	Social networking service
5	Pornhub	Pornographic online video platform
6	XVideos	Pornographic online video platform
7	WhatsApp	Instant messaging
8	Google.cl	Search engine
9	Bing	Search engine
10	Wikipedia	Encyclopedia
11	BancoEstado	Electronic banking
12	X	Social networking service
13	Radio Bío-Bío	News
14	MercadoLibre	E-commerce
15	ChatGPT	Artificial intelligence chatbot
16	Emol	News
17	TikTok	Social network service
18	Netflix	Streaming service
19	juga.world	
20	Falabella	E-commerce

=== Bandwidth ===
- Average speed of fixed connections: 280.02 Mbit/s
- International bandwidth (kbit/s per user): 73.1 (40th in the ranking)

=== Malicious traffic ===
According to the State of the Internet report for the last quarter of 2018, Chile ranked 68th in generating the most attack traffic worldwide.

== Technical aspects ==
At a technical level, the .cl domain allows some additional features: it allows internationalized domain names (IDN), IPv6 traffic and security authentication for the domain names (DNSSEC). In addition, there are currently 12 Root Servers mirrors in Chile: there are instances of servers D, E, F, J, K and L in Santiago, an instance of the server L in Concepción and copies of the roots B, D and E in Arica. The instance of B Root Server hosted in Arica is the first copy of this letter hosted outside the United States and currently (June 2019) serves IPv4 traffic and IPv6 for all countries in the world. Root servers B, D, E, J and K are hosted by PIT CHILE.

== Internet infrastructure ==
=== International connection infrastructure ===
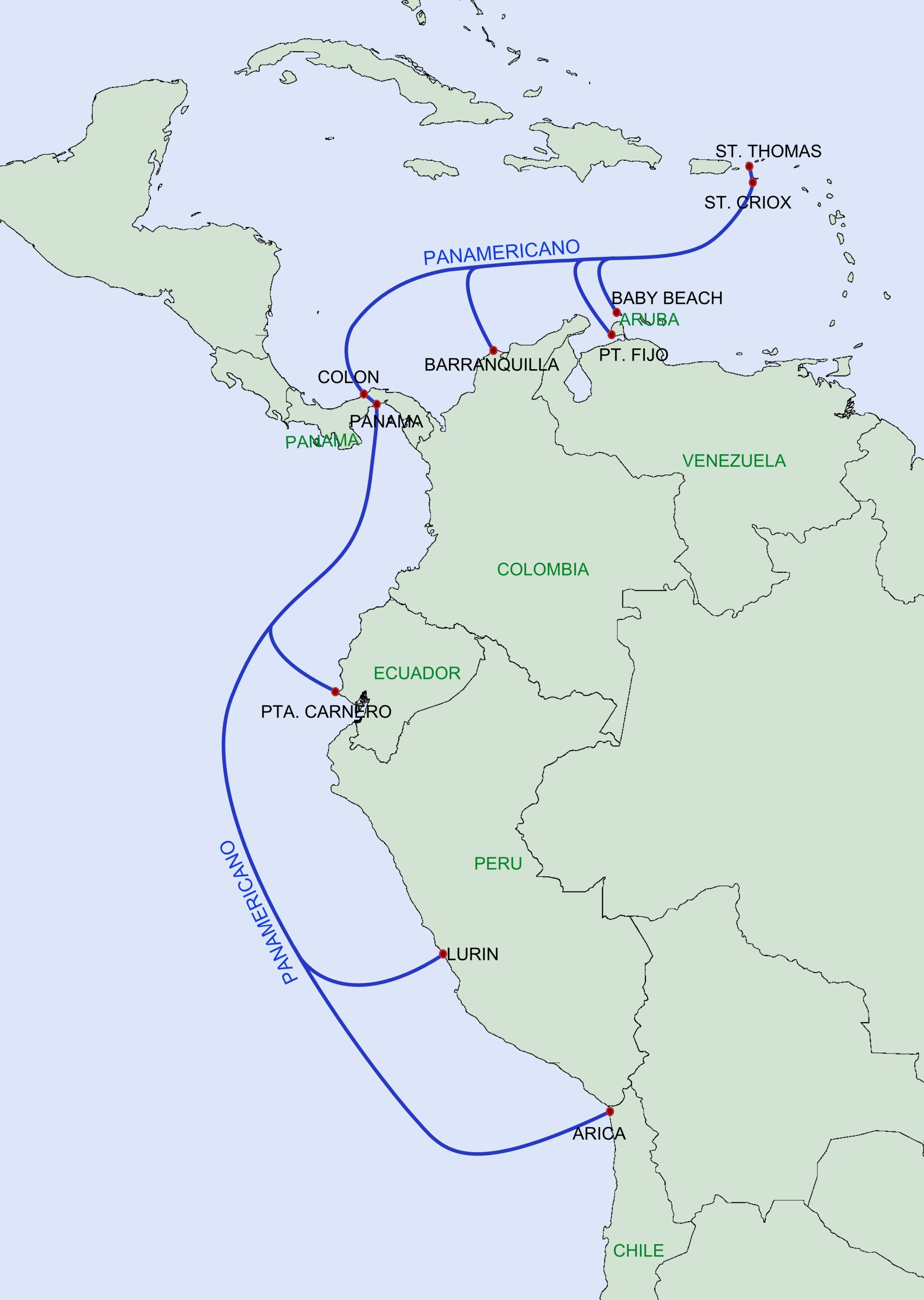
Pan-American Cable is the main Internet connection route in Chile to the rest of the world

==== International submarine cables ====
The international submarine cables that are active in the first semester of 2021 are:

- Pan American (PanAm), Arica
- South America-1 (SAm-1), Arica and Valparaíso
- South American Crossing (SAC)/Latin American Nautilus (LAN), Valparaíso
- Curie by Google, Valparaíso
- Cable Mistral of Telxius, Arica, Valparaíso

==== Satellite teleports ====
In addition to the aforementioned cables, the connection abroad is complemented by Satellite Internet through the following teleports:

- Longovilo, from Entel Chile.
- Chacalluta, from Movistar Chile.
- Arica, from HughesNet.
- Caldera, Coquimbo, Pudahuel, San Clemente, Puerto Saavedra, Puerto Montt and Punta Arenas of Starlink

=== Local connection infrastructure ===
==== National submarine cables ====
There are also national submarine cables that provide connectivity between cities:

- Cable Prat (Arica – Puerto Montt and several intermediate cities)
- Cable Pargua – Chiloé
- Cable Quellón – Puerto Chacabuco (Aysén Region)
- Southern Optical Fiber (Puerto Montt – Punta Arenas)

In addition to these cables, the connection to the Magallanes Region was primarily through a mixed fiber optic and microwave connection that has operated throughout Argentina since 2005 until the entry into service of the Austral Fiber Optic.

==== Traffic exchange points ====
With the creation of NAP Chile, in 1997, the first traffic exchange point (PIT) was inaugurated in Chile, to which several small operators connect. Until that minute all traffic was going to the US.

In 1999, Subtel issues a circular detailing the technical requirements that PITs must have, seeking to promote local traffic exchange. As a result, multiple PITs are generated that are connected to several others, promoting the direct local exchange of traffic between operators and the reduction of cost and latency for users.

These PITs also begin to connect various content delivery networks which further improves the perception of users.

As of January 2022, Subtel recognizes 10 traffic exchange points.

=== Domestic infrastructure ===
Technology	%
xDSL	0.55%
HFC	25.6%
WiMAX	0.01%
FTTH	71.3%
Satellital or BAM	2.64%

==== Wired infrastructure ====
- FTTH (Fiber to the house): It is the newest infrastructure, started in 2006 by Gtd and in 2012 by Movistar, currently it is the most used, becoming 71.3% of the country's fixed connections. There are several companies that offer this type of access, including WOM, Entel, Gtd, Telsur, Movistar, VTR and Mundo Pacífico., all with different geographical coverage, some quite limited. The bandwidth fluctuates at a maximum of 10 Gbit/s download and 10 Gbit/s upload, tending to be symmetrical.
- Cable modem or HFC: in Chile it is the most extensive infrastructure in coverage (Started in 1996 using the previous cabling Cable television started in 1987) and the second most widely used technology, with 25.6% of residential fixed connections. There are several companies that offer this type of access, the most massive are VTR, Claro Chile and CMET. The bandwidth fluctuates at a maximum of 940 Mbit/s download and 20 Mbit/s/s upload.
- xDSL: It is the oldest infrastructure that uses the telephone wiring network, in many sectors it is in disuse by its operators. At the end of 2024, there were 0.55% of residential fixed connections. depending on the technology used and the state of the cabling, bandwidth fluctuates at a maximum of 50 Mbit/s download and at 15 Mbit/s upload.

==== Wireless infrastructure ====
- Mobile Internet and mobile broadband: These represent a significant percentage of broadband connections in the country, especially in rural areas. The mobile phone infrastructures are WOM with 3G, 4G and 5G technology, Claro Chile with 2G, 3G and 4G, Entel Chile with technology 2G, 3G, 4G and 5G and Movistar Chile with 2G, 3G, 4G and 5G technology. With tremendously variable transfer rates from 114 kbit/s to 540 Mbit/s depending on the geography and the technology used. They also join the Mobile Internet infrastructure such as Mobile virtual network operator: Gtd, Virgin Mobile Chile, VTR, Mundo, Smobi and Plintron.
- Satellite Internet: Several companies offer satellite access service for companies. At the residential level, it is a rather small phenomenon, HughesNet and Starlink have coverage throughout Chile As of December 2024, it reported more than 2.64% clients.
- WiMAX: The Will technology, was tested in Chile in the early 2000s; it did not work well due to Chile's geography. At the beginning of the 2000s it offered Entel Chile, Claro Chile and VTR (Chile) WiMAX, but currently none offer it or have an infrastructure, today only small ISP sell it in small areas.
