= Microsoft Research Labs =

Microsoft Research Labs are laboratories operated by Microsoft Research for researching computer science topics and issues.

Microsoft Research Labs may also refer to:

- Microsoft Live Labs, a partnership between MSN and Microsoft Research between 2006 and 2010
- Microsoft adCenter Labs, an applied research group at Microsoft that supports Microsoft adCenter
- Microsoft FUSE Labs, an applied research group that focuses on real-time and media rich experiences
