= Entel =

Entel may refer to:

== Companies ==
- Entel (Bolivia), a Bolivian state-owned telecommunications company
- Entel (Chile), a Chilean telecommunications company
  - Entel PCS, a mobile phone operator, subsidiary of the Chilean company
- ENTel, a former Argentine state-owned telecommunications company

== Buildings and structures ==
- Torre Entel, a telecommunications tower in Chile

== People ==
- Nicolas Entel (born 1975), Argentine filmmaker
