= KSP =

KSP may refer to:

== Groups, organisations, companies ==
=== Politics and government ===
- Kentucky State Police, Kentucky, USA
- Karnataka State Police, Karnataka, India
- Kerala Socialist Party, Kerala, India
- Krantikari Samyavadi Party, Bihar, India
- Christian Unity Party (KSP; Norwegian: Kristent Samlingsparti)
- Presidential Staff Office (KSP; Indonesian: Kantor Staf Presiden) of Indonesia

=== Sports ===
- Polonia Warsaw (KSP; Polish: Klub Sportowy Polonia; Polonia sports club), a Polish sports club in Warsaw
- KSPO Professional (UCI team code: KSP)

=== Others ===
- Klub Sceptyków Polskich ('Polish Skeptics Club'), a Polish skeptical organisation
- SAEP (IATA airline code KSP), a Colombian cargo airline

== Places ==
- Kesrisinghpur (KSP), Ganganagar, Rajasthan, India; a town
- Kentucky State Penitentiary, Kentucky, USA
- Kaohsiung Software Park, Kaohsiung, Taiwan

== Science and technology ==
- Keyword Services Platform
- Key signing party, an event where people verify each other's digital cryptographic keys
- Solubility product constant (K_{sp}); see solubility equilibrium
- k shortest path routing
- Kerbal Space Program, a spaceflight simulator game

== Arts and entertainment ==
- KSP: Kapamilya Sabado Party, a Philippine variety show
- Konsyerto sa Palasyo, a Philippine concert series

== Other uses ==
- Karyakshama Seva Padakkama, a Sri Lankan medal
- "Ksp", a prefix code for machine guns manufactured in Sweden; see List of equipment of the Swedish Armed Forces
- Karolinska Scales of Personality, a Swedish personality questionnaire
- Kabba language (ISO 639 language code ksp)
