= Socl =

Socl may refer to:

- So.cl, a social networking website by Microsoft.
- Sulfinyl chloride, sulfinyl halides with the general formula R-S(O)-Cl.
