= Microsoft FUSE Labs =

Microsoft's Future Social Experiences (FUSE) Labs was started by Ray Ozzie and is run by Lili Cheng. The group focuses on real-time and media rich experiences and is located in Bellevue, WA. It used to have offices in Cambridge, Massachusetts, and Cambridge, UK. A similar, earlier initiative was Microsoft Live Labs, a collaboration between Microsoft Research and MSN which ended in 2010.

In addition to its foundational work in social computing, Microsoft FUSE Labs has been instrumental in shaping the future of conversational AI. The lab played a key role in the development of the Microsoft Bot Framework, which has become a cornerstone of Microsoft's AI strategy. This framework enables developers to build intelligent bots that can interact naturally with users across platforms like Microsoft Teams, Skype, and web applications. FUSE Labs’ emphasis on real-time interaction and media-rich experiences laid the groundwork for these technologies, which are now widely used in customer service, productivity tools, and enterprise solutions.

Moreover, FUSE Labs has consistently embraced a multidisciplinary approach, blending design, engineering, and research to create user-centric innovations. Projects like So.cl and HereHere exemplify the lab’s commitment to exploring how technology can foster community engagement and social awareness. These initiatives often serve as experimental platforms, allowing Microsoft to test new ideas and gather user feedback before integrating successful concepts into mainstream products. Through this agile and exploratory model, FUSE Labs continues to influence the evolution of digital communication and collaborative experiences within and beyond Microsoft.

== Projects ==
- - Microsoft Bot Framework & Conversational AI tools for developers.
- Bing Twitter - Find out what topics are hottest on Twitter.
- Docs.com - Discover, create and share Office docs with your Facebook friends
- So.cl () - Social search service
- Kodu Game Lab - Kodu Game Lab.
