= Almendral S.A. =

- Company type: Public
- Traded as: BCS: ALMENDRAL
- Industry: Telecommunications
- Founded: 1981; 45 years ago
- Headquarters: Santiago, Chile
- Key people: Luis Felipe Gazitúa Achondo (Chairman), and Alvaro Rodriguez Correa (CEO)
- Products: Telecommunications, property, health
- Number of employees: 9 (2015)
- Subsidiaries: Entel
- Website: www.almendral.cl

Almendral S.A. is a Chilean holding company established in 1981 that invests, or has invested, in the telecommunications, property, sanitation and healthcare sectors.

Almendral owns a controlling stake (54.8%) in Entel through its Altel Inversiones Ltda. subsidiary. The stake represents 98% of Almendral's investment activity, although it also has minor holdings in the areas of housing and sanitation.
