= .cl =

Top-level Internet domain for Chile

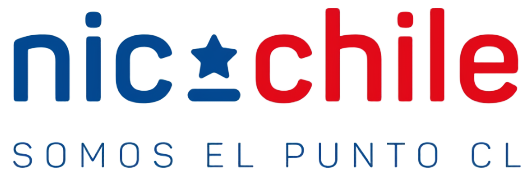
- Introduced: December 15, 1987; 38 years ago
- TLD type: Country code top-level domain
- Status: Active
- Registry: NIC Chile
- Sponsor: NIC Chile (University of Chile)
- Intended use: Entities connected with Chile
- Actual use: Popular in Chile
- Registered domains: 703,367 (2024-03-04)
- Registration restrictions: Anyone may register a domain .cl from anywhere in the world without the need of a local representative
- Structure: Registrations are made directly at the second level (there are also third-level registrations for government sites under gov.cl and gob.cl)
- Documents: Rules
- Dispute policies: Dispute resolution
- DNSSEC: yes
- Registry website: NIC Chile

.cl is the Internet country code top-level domain (ccTLD) for Chile.

== History ==
It was created in 1987 and is administered by the University of Chile.

Since April 2011, it supports DNSSEC.

== Registration ==
Registration of second-level domains under this TLD is open to anyone, as established by the current regulation since December 2013, which eliminated the requirement for foreign registrants to have a local contact with a RUN, the Chilean national ID number.

Registration of names including accented letters (á, é, í, ó, ú), ñ and ü was opened up in 2005.

== IPv6 support ==
In the Hurricane Electric report from May 2012, it appears as IPv6 enabled domain and with nameservers in IPv6.

== Domain hack ==
Microsoft used it in a domain hack for its social networking service so.cl.

Oracle Corporation used the domain hack ora.cl as a URL shortening

== See also ==
- Internet in Chile
