= Torre Entel =

TV and telecommunications tower in Santiago, Chile

Coordinates: 33°26′41″S 70°39′22″W

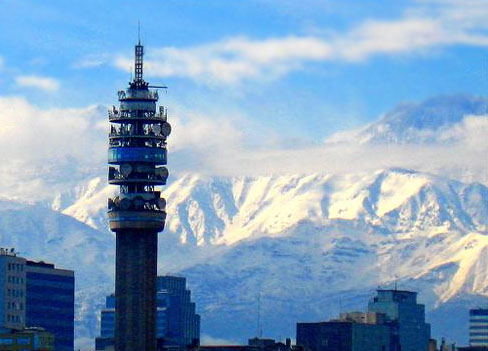
Torre Entel

Torre Entel (Entel Tower) is the name of a 127.4-metre (418 ft)-high TV and telecommunications tower in Santiago, Chile. Torre Entel has an observation deck open for visitors. Construction began in 1970 during Eduardo Frei Montalva term as president and it was inaugurated in 1974. In 1976 it carried its first television transmissions. For many years it was the tallest building in Chile and today remains a symbol of Santiago. The tower is constructed of concrete, steel, and aluminum.

With 128 m high and 18 floors, it was after the end of its construction in 1974, the highest architectural structure in the country, a title it kept until the inauguration of the Telefónica Tower in 1996 with 143 m. Already surpassed in height by other buildings, it continues being the structure of greater prominence in the commune of Santiago, being located next to the Avenida Libertador General Bernardo O'Higgins and to a block of the La Moneda Palace, adding to the rationale behind its iconic status in the city. Its design represents a torch, an ancient form of telecommunication.

== History ==
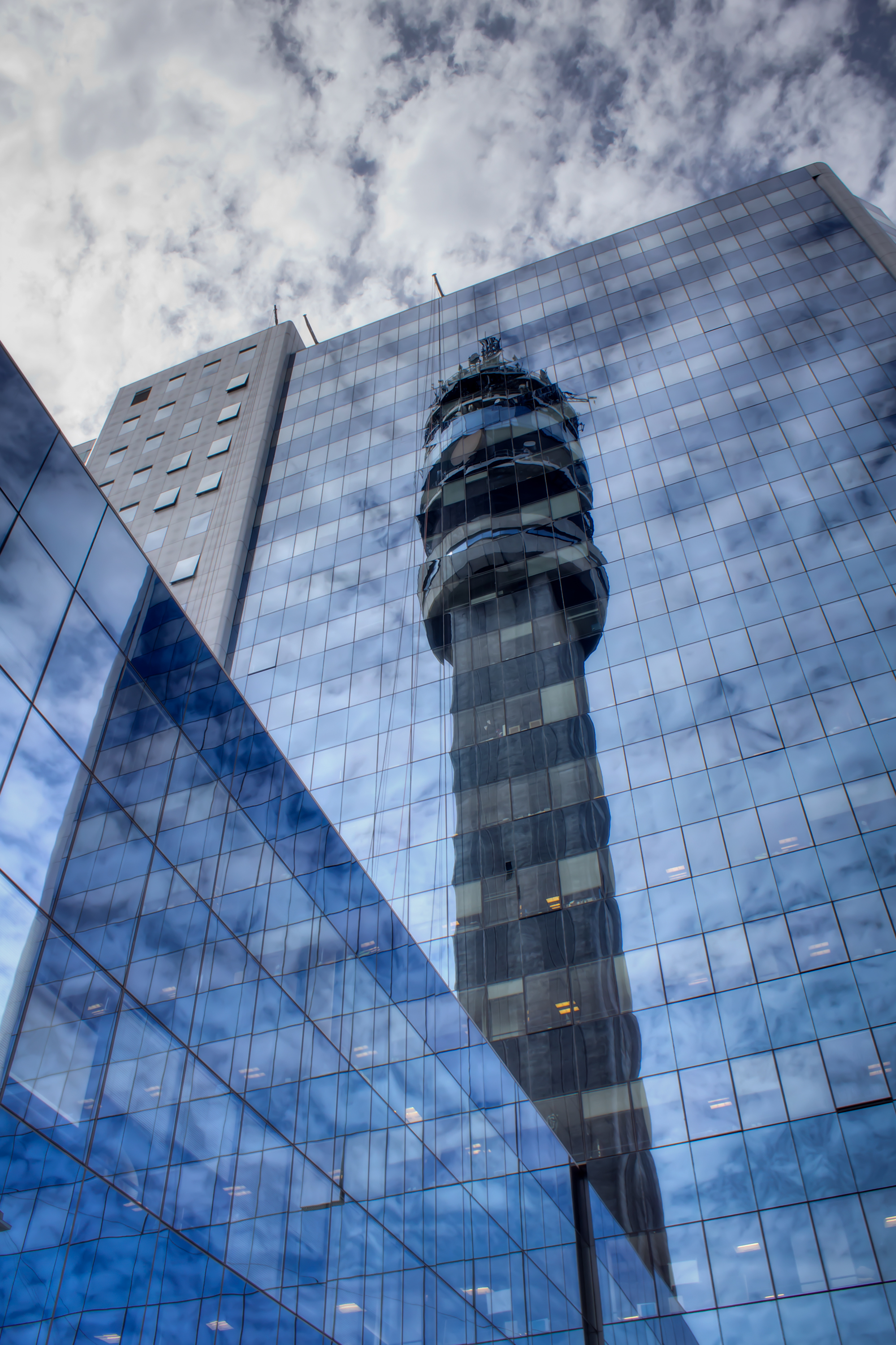
Torre Entel

Its construction began during the government of Eduardo Frei Montalva, on July 1, 1970, as part of the National Telecommunications Center. After four years of construction, the Tower reached its current height on August 30, 1974. Its structure was influenced by the Post Office Tower in London, which had been built ten years earlier.

Later, on September 8, 1975, two satellite dishes were installed, which were the first telecommunications elements visible from the outside, and finally, on April 12, 1976, the telephone channels came into service. From that moment on, the Entel Tower became the vital nucleus of the country's communications system by allowing the interconnection of Entel's telephone, television, radio and microwave network services with those of the Chilean Telephone Company (currently Movistar) and with the north, center and south of the country and the province of Mendoza, Argentina. In addition, it is connected to the Satellite Communications Ground Station. Currently, all the equipment that carries international traffic via satellite, the Santiago-Mendoza terrestrial, the southern and northern National Trunk networks operate there, and it interconnects the public long-distance telephone, telex, television and radio broadcasting services.

On the night of December 31, 2009, the largest LED screen in South America was inaugurated and installed at the top of the tower to mark the "Bicentennial New Year". The screen has 320 square meters and is intended to display weather information and news.

For Chileans, the Entel Tower has become a true symbol. Its image, visible from the farthest points of the capital, is a must for photographic postcards or a common point of reference.

On November 12, 2019, and as part of the series of protests in Chile, the base of the tower was looted and vandalized by unknown persons.

== Architecture ==
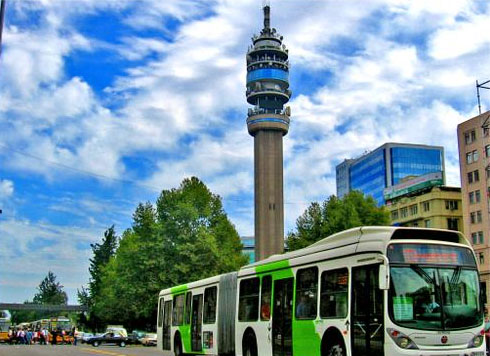
Torre Entel seen from Alameda

The Entel Tower is 127.40 m high from its base and is located at the intersection of the Alameda del Libertador Bernardo O'Higgins and Amunátegui, next to the La Moneda station of the Santiago Metro as this is a strategic place due to the proximity of the sites where connections to the urban telephone network are made.

The tower has 9,000 m^{3} with a diameter of 22 m, a total of 2,700 m^{3} of concrete, a surface area of 1,643 m2, a weight of 8620 t and a foundation weight of 2000 t.
