= Curie (submarine communications cable) =

Transatlantic communications cable connecting the US to Chile

- Owners: Google
- Landing points: 1. (United States) El Segundo, California; 2. Balboa, Panama; 3. Valparaíso, Chile
- Total length: 10,476 km
- Design capacity: 72 Tbit/s
- Technology: Fibre Optic
- Date of first use: 2020 Q2

Curie is a private subsea communications cable owned by Google, connecting the United States to Chile and Panama. First commissioned in 2018 and completed in 2019, Curie is Google's third fully owned subsea cable, and Chile's first subsea cable in nearly two decades.
