= Lili Cheng =

Lili Cheng is a technologist and entrepreneur, known for her work contributing to artificial intelligence (AI), machine learning, and human-computer interaction.

== Education and early career ==
Lili Cheng was born in Nebraska to a Japanese mother and a Chinese father during the 1960s. She earned a degree in architecture from Cornell University and New York University. She moved to Tokyo, Japan in 1987, where she first started working at Nihon Sikkei, an architecture and design firm. Years later, she moved to Los Angeles, where she worked on urban design projects at Skidmore, Owings & Merrell. During a trip to New York, she met with people who, at the time, were exploring the growing intersections of computers, art, and design. Upon coming back to Los Angeles, she quit her job at SOM and enrolled in the interactive telecommunications program under Burns at the Tisch School of Arts at New York University.

== Career and projects ==
In 1993, she switched her career path and began working for Apple. This is where she began working on Quicktime VR and Quicktime Conferencing. Two years later she left Apple, and started working for Microsoft. Cheng is the Corporate Vice President of Microsoft, where she has been for the last twenty years. Cheng focuses on the platform discussing AI and research division within the company. With her position at Microsoft, she is responsible for overseeing the development of AI technology, including conversational agents, machine learning platforms, and advancements natural language processing systems. She worked on Cortana and a number of other AI driven technologies.

In 2021, Cheng was elected to the National Academy of Engineering.

== Contributions ==
Upon joining Microsoft, Cheng helped build Windows 95. The next project she worked on was Comic Chat, Internet Explorer 3.0's default chat client that launched 1996. Cheng is credited for Microsoft's AI Developer Platform, which includes both cognitive services and bot framework. In March 2016, Cheng helped launch Tay, an AI Twitterbot made to imitate a teenage American girl through natural language processing. However, after interacting with numerous trolls Tay picked up on their language and went on to spew numerous vulgar and racist replies.
