= Microsoft adCenter Labs =

Tech research group

Microsoft adCenter Labs (a.k.a. adlabs), is an applied research group at Microsoft that supports Microsoft adCenter. Microsoft adCenter (formerly MSN adCenter), is the division of the Microsoft Network (MSN) responsible for MSN's advertising services.

== Introduction ==
Founded in January 2006, Microsoft adCenter Labs’ primary research facility is located in Redmond, Washington. However, a number of researchers and staff are located in China, Israel, UK, and New York City. It was co-founded by then general manager of adcenter Tarek Najm with Harry Shum. Microsoft adCenter lab works across a broad range of technology areas, including keyword and content technologies, audience intelligence, ad selection and relevance, social networking, and video and interactive media.

The algorithms developed by the team operate in the engines of Microsoft adCenter products such as Paid Search, Content Ads, and Behavioral Targeting. One of the graduated technologies from Microsoft adCenter lab is Keyword Services Platform. The Keyword Services Platform (KSP) is a keyword research tool available through Microsoft adCenter, which contains a set of algorithms for providing information about keywords used in search engine queries. KSP delivers a standardized set of keyword technologies through a Web services model, accessible via an application programming interface (API) and a Microsoft Excel add-in.

== Research Areas ==
Adlabs is currently working in following areas:

1. Content Intelligence

2. User Intelligence

3. Ad selection and relevance

4. Behavioral Targeting

5. Social networks

6. Platforms and devices

7. Video and Audio

== Microsoft Gaze ==
Microsoft Gaze is in-text advertisement solution that helps publishers to better monetize their content and users to gather meaningful and contextual information at the fingertip.

Specifically, Microsoft Gaze is based upon contextual ads and rich entities. The contextual advertising offered by Microsoft Gaze uses semantic analysis to determine dominant keywords within the content of a published web site. Rich entities are defined within Microsoft Gaze as pieces of content that are enriched with additional pre-defined attributes that are interesting to the users.

Sometimes, the dominant keywords of a site are representative of what the content is by using technologies like KEX (keyword extraction) and smart algorithms. However, given the complexity of people, the dominant keywords may not actually reflect what the reader's main interests are. Microsoft Gaze approaches this complexity as an opportunity to engage with people in way to learn more about what they want. This way, Gaze can serve more contextually accurate advertising.

The rich entity is the key to the process. Take the rich entity of a celebrity like Paris Hilton. If someone is interested in a celebrity then they are often curious about certain elements (or attributes) of the celebrities life such as birthplace, birth date, favorite hangouts, video clips, etc. Microsoft Gaze can create a rich entity is a phrase that can be monetized with additional attributes and entity types such as Famous People, Location, Product, Company, and Event. These entities are used to engage the reader and narrow down the ads that will be most meaningful and interesting to them.
