= So.cl =

Defunct social networking service

- Founded: December 2011
- Dissolved: March 15, 2017; 9 years ago
- Owner: Microsoft
- Website: so.cl
- Registration: Required
- Current status: Discontinued

So.cl (pronounced "social") was a social networking service and social search engine operated by Microsoft FUSE Labs. They announced on March 7, 2017 that it would be closing down So.cl on March 15, 2017.

== Design ==
So.cl appeared similar to Google+ and borrowed concepts from Facebook, Twitter and Pinterest. It occupied a niche role and was intended to augment rather than replace those services. Users were able to post a collage of pictures pertaining to a specific topic and share it with friends or "followers". Users were also able to post visual comments under these posts by sending "riffs". Riffs were a separate collage of graphic media that relate to the topic of the post. By using riffs, users were able to communicate with other users with media that was related to their interests.

Signup and login required a Microsoft account or So.cl-connected Facebook account. Registration was only open to users 18 and older.

The site had integrated search features using the Bing API. Searches were public by default, but could be marked private.

Users could follow other users or categorical interest pages. Users could share content they viewed on the Internet with other users by installing the So.cl's Bookmarklet application which added a “Share on So.cl” button to the browser's bookmark bar.

Video Parties

Video Parties were collections of live YouTube video shared and edited by users.

Following interests

Users could subscribe to Topic pages in order to populate their interest feeds.

== History ==
So.cl launched in December 2011 and was first available through a partnership to students of the University of Washington, Syracuse University, and New York University. While still experimental, the site opened up to all users on 20 May 2012. The web address is a domain hack using the .cl top level domain.

== Public beta ==
Socl was released as a public beta on December 4, 2012. The announcement was made by a post by Microsoft Research's FuSE Lab on their website. The release came with a completely redesigned interface.
