= Entel (Chile) =

Chilean telecommunications company

National Communications Company
- Native name: Empresa Nacional de Telecomunicaciones
- Company type: Sociedad Anónima
- Traded as: BCS: ENTEL
- Industry: Telecommunications
- Founded: 1964; 62 years ago
- Headquarters: Las Condes, Santiago, Chile
- Areas served: Chile; Peru
- Key people: Juan Hurtado Vicuña, (Chairman); Richard Büchi Buc, (CEO)
- Products: Fixed line; Mobile telephony; Internet services; digital television
- Revenue: ▲US$ 2.9 billion (2012)
- Net income: ▼US$ 348.6 million (2012)
- Number of employees: 4,505
- Website: www.entel.cl

The National Communications Company (ENTEL, from Spanish: Empresa Nacional de Telecomunicaciones) (doing business as Entel-Chile S.A.) is the largest Chilean telecommunications company. The company is known for the 127 meters (417 ft) high Torre Entel (Entel Tower) that rises above central Santiago and constitutes one of the city's landmarks.

As of December 2013 Entel PCS had 38.8% of the Chilean mobile market. It was the first American operator to launch a GSM mobile network in 1997. In 2000, the Entel PCS network offered support for GPRS and in 2003 it added EDGE support.

== History ==
Entel was started in 1964 by the Chilean government at the time to improve long distance, improve telecommunications quality within the country and build a network trunk to replace the old infrastructure badly damaged by an earthquake. Entel installed microwave networks in almost the entire national territory and built in 1968 a satellite station in Longovilo 40 miles (64 km) south west of Santiago, a Latin American first.

Entel's activities initially were data transmission and communications service, long distance telecommunications according to the wishes of CORFO. The company built the National Center for Telecommunications, popularly known as Torre Entel in Santiago, which functions as the central node. After its privatization it was licensed to operate domestic services: cell phone, Entel PCS and land line, known as Entel Phone. It also offered Internet connectivity.

Entel's privatization began in 1986 and was finalized in 1992. The following year, through a series of transactions, Group Chilquinta acquired the 19.99% ownership of the company. In June 1996, the Board of Directors authorized an increase in capital that allowed the entry of Telecom Italia, which acquired another 19.99%, sharing control with the Group Chilquinta.

During the first half of 1999, the company increased its capital by $215 million. This contribution came from Quiñenco group. In March 2001, Telecom Italia bought shares of Chilquinta and Matte group, reaching a 54.76% stake.

Entel's stock is a big part of the Chilean stock market. Shares were held by pension funds, which at the end of 2004 comprised 25.6% of the shares of the company. Additionally, international funds and individuals acquired shares.

In 2005, Chilean group Almendral S.A. gained control of Entel Group through its Altel Inversiones subsidiary, holding 54.76 percent of the company.

In 2006 Entel sold its entire share in Americatel Central America SA and their direct and indirect subsidiaries, BVI Holding Isela Inc. under contract Stock Purchase Agreement ("SPA").

In April 2013 Entel started the acquisition process of Nextel del Perú operations valued on US$400 million. The process ended on the second semester of 2013, and was subsequently renamed Entel Perú. (A state-owned Entel Perú had operated from 1969 until 1994 when it was acquired by Spanish Telefónica).

On 22 October 2022, Entel announced that the company will sell its fiber optic assets to ON*NET Fibra for US$358 million. As part of the deal, Entel would continue to offer internet services for residences on ON*NET's fiber optic network.

== Structure ==
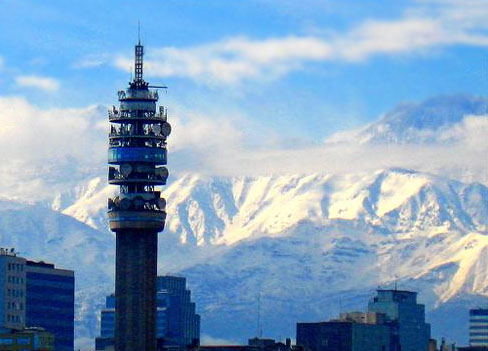
Torre Entel in Santiago de Chile, with the Andes Mountains in the background

Entel is a corporation with several subsidiaries:

- Entel Call Center
- Entel Data Center
- Entel Internet
- Entel Phone
- Entel TV HD
