= Konsyerto sa Palasyo =

- Venue: Malacañang Palace Complex, Manila
- Start date: April 22, 2023
- End date: TBD
- No. of shows: 4

Konsyerto sa Palasyo (KSP; lit. 'Concert at the Palace') is a concert series initiated by the government of the Philippines.

== Background ==
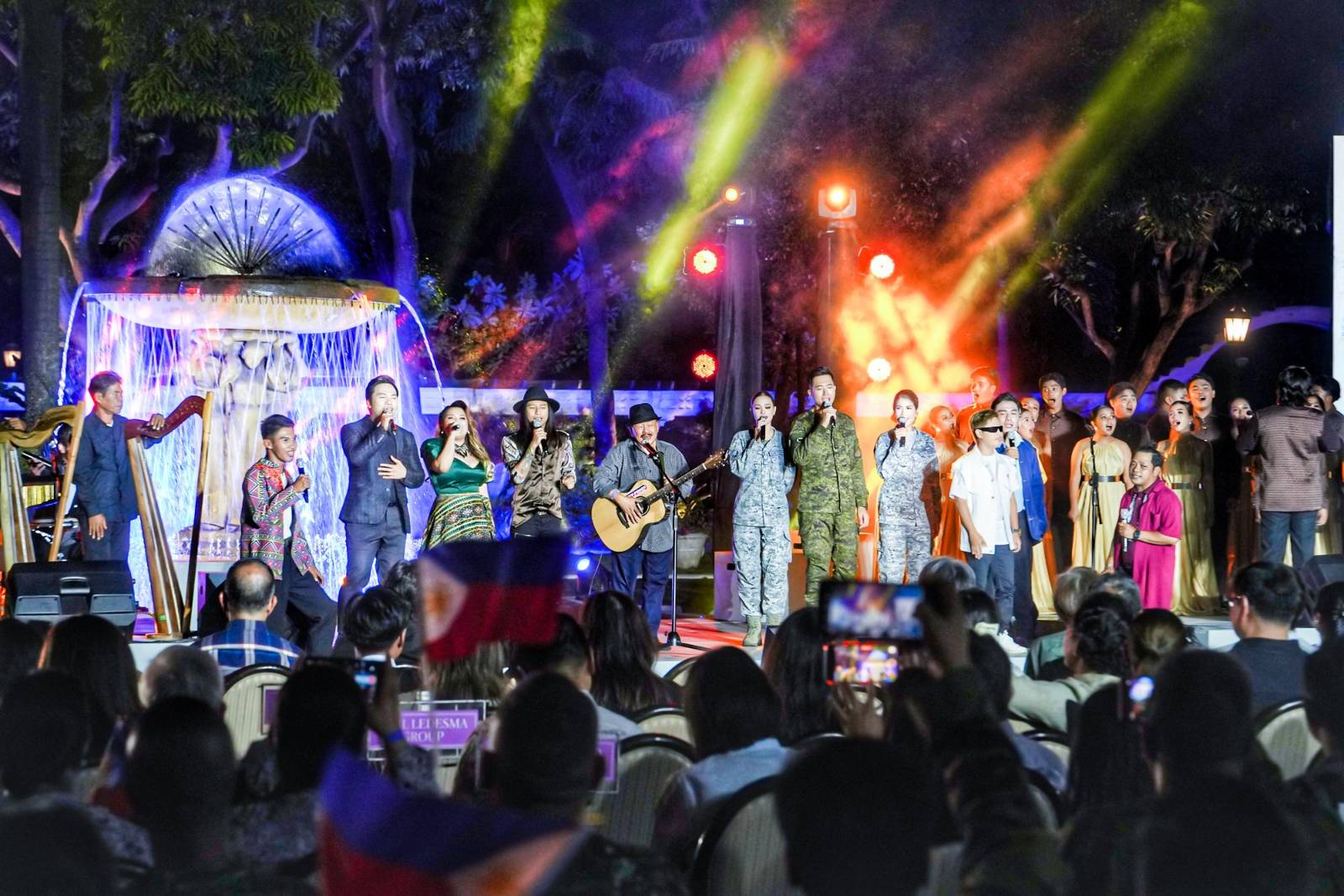
The Awit ng Magiting concert on April 22, 2023.

The Konsyerto sa Palasyo (KSP) is a concert series set inside the Malacañang Palace complex intended to feature the 'best up and coming' Filipino artists by the Philippine government under the administration of President Bongbong Marcos. In February 2023 during the Ani ng Dangal Awards ceremony by the National Commission for Culture and the Arts, Marcos urged the agency to cultivate the creative industry. He stressed that the industry should not be left behind in the recovery process of the Philippine economy's from the COVID-19 pandemic.

The concert series was first announced to the public on April 13, 2023.

It is organized by the following agencies: Office of the President, the Presidential Communications Office, Social Secretary's Office (SOSEC) and Presidential Broadcast Staff – Radio Television Malacañang (PBS-RTVM).

Konsyerto sa Palasyo: Awit ng Magiting, the first event set on April 22, 2023, is dedicated to the Armed Forces of the Philippines (AFP) for "its sacrifices in maintaining the nation's sovereignty, peace and security". Several succeeding events are planned for the year 2023. Organizers plan to hold an event every 3 months.

Marcos' father, Ferdinand Marcos Sr. also had a similar program named the Concert in the Park which featured performances in open spaces.

== Events ==
Concert	Date	Featured artists
Konsyerto sa Palasyo: Awit ng Magiting	April 22, 2023	Poppert Bernadas (Davao), Limuel Llanes (Quezon), Princess Vire (Quezon City), Kenli Sibayan (Ilocos Norte), AK Fella, Glnn and MC Julyo (Cavite), Marco Crainzee Revidiso (Parañaque), Jay-r and Benedicto Sr. Costaños (Cebu), Samiweng Singers (Ilocos Norte), Jeddi Cris Celeste (Iloilo City)
Konsyerto sa Palasyo: Para sa Atletang Pilipino	August 6, 2023	Chloe Redondo, Emman Buñao, Jopper Ril, Kevin Traqueña; beatbox artists Adrian “AD BEAT” Ferrer and Neil Rey Llanes, Aivan Mendoza, PINOPELA, Douglas Nierras Powerdance
Konsyerto sa Palasyo Para sa Mahal Nating Guro	October 1, 2023	—
Konsyerto sa Palasyo: Para sa ating mga Healthcare Workers	June 30, 2024	Martin Nievera, Powerdance, Garrett Bolden, Brenan Espartinez, Justin Taller, Christel Galacan, Lara Maigue, Alyn Magadia, Kristel de Catalina, Ayta Brothers
