= Longovilo =

- Hamlet and Locality
- Location in Chile
- Coordinates (locality): 33°56′17″S 71°21′41″W
- Country: Chile
- Region: Santiago Metropolitan Region
- Province: Melipilla Province
- Commune: San Pedro
- Time zone: UTC−4 (CLT)
  - Summer (DST): UTC−3 (CLST)
- Country/area code: 56 + 2

Longovilo is a small hamlet and locality in the Chilean commune of San Pedro de Melipilla (Melipilla Province), in the Santiago Metropolitan Region of central Chile.

== Satellite Communications Ground Station ==
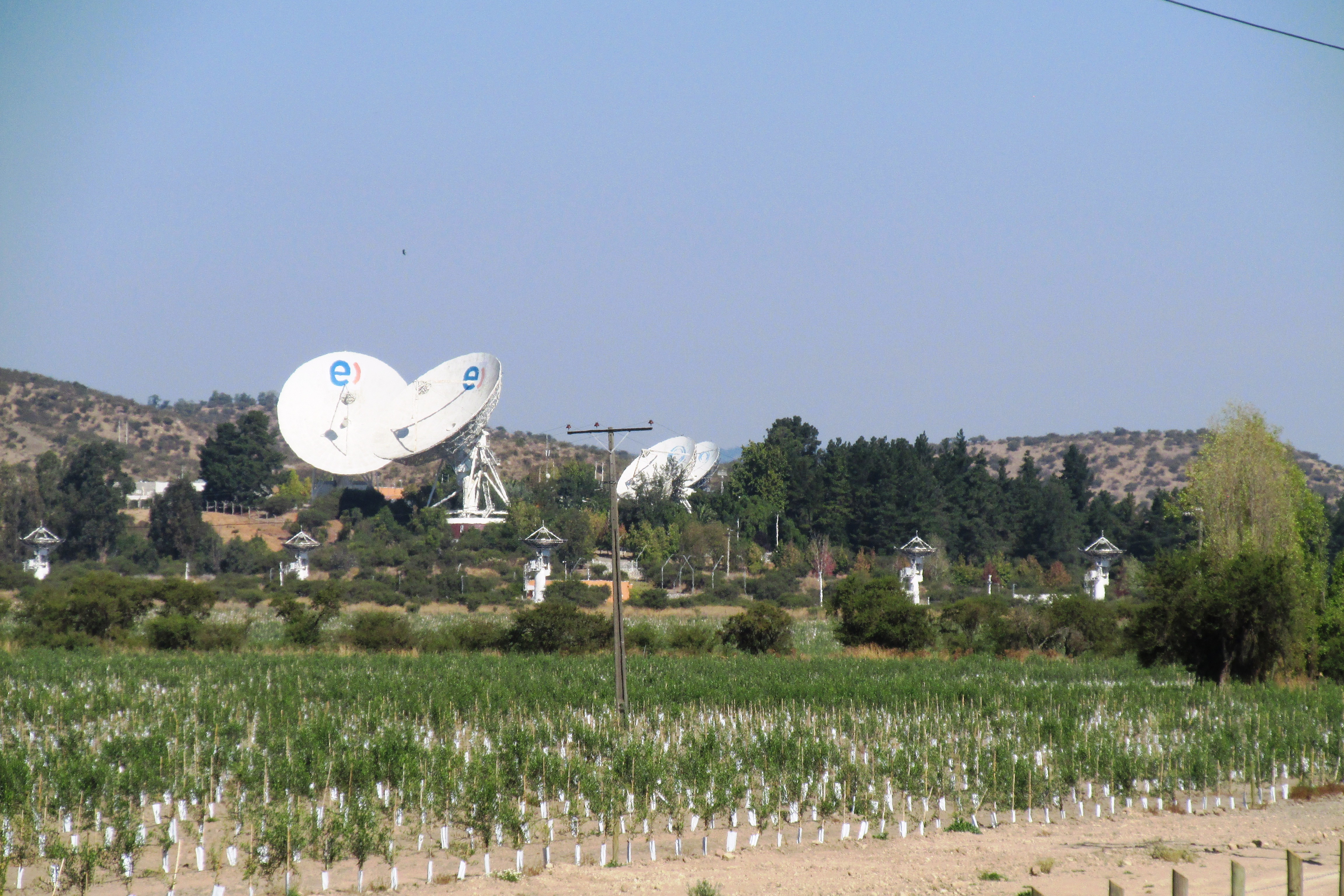
The Longovilo Satellite Communications Ground Station

In 1968, the telecommunications company Entel built the first satellite telecommunication ground station in Latin America in Longovilo. The station was officially inaugurated on 9 August 1968 in a ceremony presided over by President Eduardo Frei Montalva, marking a major milestone in the history of telecommunications in Chile.

The facility also gained significant public notoriety in 1969, when it enabled the live broadcast of the Apollo 11 Moon landing, making Chile the first country in Latin America to receive the transmission. On July 20 of that year, a Sunday, President Frei decreed a national holiday until noon on Monday so that as many Chileans as possible could watch the event live without interruption.
