= List of telecommunications companies in Europe =

A telecommunications company (historically known as a telephone company) is a company which provides broadband and/or telephony services.

The telecommunications companies of Europe are listed below:

== Albania ==
=== Fixed-line operators ===
- Abissnet
- ASC
- Digicom
- Nisatel
- One (4iG)
- Vodafone (Vodafone Group)

=== Mobile operators ===
- One (4iG)
- Vodafone (Vodafone Group)

== Armenia ==
=== Fixed-line operators ===
- Telecom Armenia
- Aither (OfficePhone.am)
- Crossnet

=== Mobile operators ===
- Team
- Ucom
- Viva Cell MTS

== Austria ==
=== Fixed-line operators ===
- 3 (CK Hutchison Holdings)
- A1 (A1 Telekom Austria Group)
- Magenta Telekom (Deutsche Telekom)

=== Mobile operators ===
- 3 (CK Hutchison Holdings)
- A1 (A1 Telekom Austria Group)
- Magenta Telekom (Deutsche Telekom)

== Azerbaijan ==
=== Fixed-line operators ===
- AzEuroTel
- Aztelekom
- Baktelecom
- Katel
- Ultel

=== Mobile operators ===
- Azercell
- Azerfon
- Bakcell
- Naxtel

== Belarus ==
=== Fixed-line operators ===
- Beltelecom
- MTS
- A1 Belarus
- COSMOS Telecom

=== Mobile operators ===
- MTS (Mobile TeleSystems)
- A1 (A1 Telekom Austria Group)
- Life:)

== Belgium ==
=== Fixed-line operators ===
- Proximus
- Scarlet (Proximus)
- Telenet (Liberty Global)
- VOO

=== Mobile operators ===
- Base (Telenet)
- Orange Belgium
- Proximus
- DIGI Belgium

== Bosnia and Herzegovina ==
=== Fixed-line operators ===
- BH Line (BH Telecom)
- HT Eronet (HT Mostar)
- m:tel (Telekom Srbija)
- Telemach (Telemach (Bosnia and Herzegovina))

=== Mobile operators ===
- BH Mobile (BH Telecom)
- HT Eronet (HT Mostar)
- m:tel (Telekom Srbija)

== Bulgaria ==
=== Fixed-line operators ===
- Vivacom (United Group)
- A1 Bulgaria (Telekom Austria Group)
- Yettel (Yettel Bulgaria)

=== Mobile operators ===
- Vivacom (United Group)
- A1 Bulgaria (Telekom Austria Group)
- Yettel (Yettel Bulgaria)
- Bulsatcom (United Group)

== Croatia ==
=== Fixed-line operators ===
- A1 Hrvatska (Telekom Austria Group)
- Hrvatski Telekom (Deutsche Telekom)
- Telemach (Telemach Hrvatska)

=== Mobile operators ===
- A1 Hrvatska (Telekom Austria Group)
- Hrvatski Telekom (Deutsche Telekom)
  - Simpa (owned by T-HT)
  - Bonbon (owned by T-HT)
- Telemach (Telemach Hrvatska)

== Cyprus ==
=== Fixed-line operators ===
- CYTA
- Epic
- PrimeTel
- Cablenet

=== Mobile operators ===
- CYTA
- Epic
- PrimeTel

== Czech Republic ==
=== Fixed-line operators ===
- GTS Czech, GTS CE
- O2 Czech Republic (e& PPF Telecom Group)
- VOLNÝ (Dial Telecom Group)

=== Mobile operators ===
- T-Mobile (Deutsche Telekom)
- O2 Czech Republic (e& PPF Telecom Group)
- U:fon (MobilKom)
- Vodafone Czech Republic (Vodafone)

=== Other operators ===
- Call Systems CZ s.r.o.
- XOTel Czech s.r.o.

== Denmark ==
=== Fixed-line operators ===
- TDC
- Telia Company

=== Mobile operators ===
- 3 (Three)
- TDC
- Telenor (previously Sonofon)

== Estonia ==
=== Fixed-line operators ===
- Telia Eesti (Telia Company)

=== Mobile operators ===
- Telia Eesti (Telia Company)
- Tele2 Eesti (Tele2)

== Finland ==
=== Mobile operators ===
- DNA Finland
- Elisa (Elisa and Vodafone)
- Telia Company

== France ==
=== Fixed-line operators ===
- Bouygues Telecom (Bouygues)
- Free (Iliad)
- Orange
- SFR (Altice)

=== Mobile operators ===
- Bouygues Telecom (Bouygues)
- Free Mobile (Iliad)
- Orange
- SFR (Altice)

== Georgia ==
=== Fixed-line operators ===
- MagtiCom
- Silknet
- New Net
- DataComm
- Datahouse Global

=== Mobile operators ===
- MagtiCom
- Silknet (Including Geocell branch)
- Mobitel (Beeline Group)

== Germany ==
=== Fixed-line operators ===
- 1&1 AG (United Internet)
- O2 (Telefónica)
- Telekom Deutschland (Deutsche Telekom)
- Vodafone (Vodafone Group)

=== Mobile operators ===
- 1&1 Mobilfunk (United Internet)
- O2 (Telefónica)
- Telekom Deutschland (Deutsche Telekom)
- Vodafone (Vodafone Group)

== Greece ==
=== Fixed-line operators ===
- COSMOTE (Deutsche Telekom)
- Vodafone Greece (Vodafone)
- Nova (United Group)

=== Mobile operators ===
- COSMOTE (OTE)
- Vodafone Greece (Vodafone)
- Nova (United Group)

== Hungary ==
=== Fixed-line operators ===
- Magyar Telekom (Deutsche Telekom)
- One Hungary (4iG)
- Yettel (Yettel Hungary)

=== Mobile operators ===
- Magyar Telekom (Deutsche Telekom)
- One Hungary (4iG)
- Yettel (Yettel Hungary)

== Iceland ==
=== Fixed-line operators ===
- Síminn
- Nova
- Sýn
- Hringdu
- Hringiðan

=== Mobile operators ===
- Síminn
- Sýn
- Nova

== Ireland ==
=== Fixed-line operators ===
- ASI Contracting
- BT Ireland (BT Group)
- Eir
- Digiweb
- Virgin Media Ireland (Liberty Global)
- Vodafone Ireland (Vodafone)

=== Mobile operators ===
- Eir
- Three Ireland (CK Hutchison Holdings)
- Vodafone Ireland (Vodafone)

== Italy ==
=== Fixed-line operators ===
- Fastweb (Swisscom)
- Iliad (Iliad)
- TIM (Telecom Italia)
- Vodafone (Swisscom)
- Wind Tre (CK Hutchison Holdings)

=== Mobile operators ===
- Fastweb (Swisscom)
- Iliad (Iliad)
- TIM (Telecom Italia)
- Vodafone (Swisscom)
- Wind Tre (CK Hutchison Holdings)

== Jersey (GB) ==
=== Fixed-line operators ===
- Jersey Telecom

=== Mobile operators ===
- Airtel

== Kosovo ==
=== Fixed-line operators ===
- Kosovo Telekom
- IPKO
- MTS
- Kujtesa

=== Mobile operators ===
- Vala
- IPKO
- MTS
- D3 Mobile (MVNO)
- Z-Mobile (MVNO)

== Latvia ==
=== Fixed-line operators ===
- Kurzemes Datorcentrs
- Lattelecom
- OPTRON

=== Mobile operators ===
- Bite (TDC)
- LMT
- Tele2
- Triatel (Telekom Baltija)

== Lithuania ==
=== Fixed-line operators ===
- Telia Lietuva

=== Mobile operators ===
- Bitė Lietuva
- Telia Lietuva
- Tele2

== Luxembourg ==
=== Fixed-line operators ===
- Cegecom S.A.
- LuxNetwork
- Luxembourg Online
- Mixvoip S.A.
- Onyx GSM
- VOX
- P&TLuxembourg
- Tele2 Luxembourg (Belgacom)

=== Mobile operators ===
- LuxGSM (P&TLuxembourg)
- Tango (Belgacom)
- VOXMobile (Orange)

== Malta ==
- GO
- Epic
- Melita

== Moldova ==
=== Fixed-line operators ===
- Interdnestrcom
- Moldtelecom
- Orange Moldova (Orange)
- StarNet

=== Mobile operators ===
- Interdnestrcom
- Moldcell
- Moldtelecom
- Orange Moldova (Orange)

== Montenegro ==
=== Fixed-line operators ===
- m:tel (Telekom Srbija + Telekom Srpske)
- T-Com Montenegro (Crnogorski Telekom)
- Telemach (United Group)

=== Mobile operators ===
- m:tel (Telekom Srbija + Telekom Srpske)
- T-Mobile Montenegro (Crnogorski Telekom)
- One Montenegro (4iG)

== Netherlands ==
=== Fixed-line operators ===
- Delta
- Odido
- KPN
- Ziggo

=== Mobile operators ===
- Odido
- KPN
- Vodafone

== North Macedonia ==
=== Fixed-line operators ===
- Telekom (Magyar Telekom)
- A1 Macedonia (Telekom Austria Group)
- Neotel Macedonia
- Telekabel

=== Mobile operators ===
- Telekom (Magyar Telekom)
- A1 Macedonia (Telekom Austria Group)
- MTEL Macedonia (MVNO)
- Mobile (Telekabel MVNO)

== Norway ==
=== Fixed-line operators ===
- Telenor
- BaneTele
- TDCSong (TDC)
- Ventelo formerly Banetele
- Hafslund Telekom
- Altibox (Lyse AS)

=== Mobile operators ===
- Telenor
- Telia Norge (Telia Company)
- Ice (Lyse AS)

== Poland ==
=== Fixed-line operators ===
- Orange Polska (Orange)
- Netia (Cyfrowy Polsat)
- TK Telekom (Netia)
- Play (Iliad)

=== Mobile operators ===
- Orange Polska (Orange)
- T-Mobile (Deutsche Telekom)
- Play (Iliad)
- Plus (Cyfrowy Polsat)

== Portugal ==
=== Fixed-line operators ===
- MEO (PT/Altice)
- NOS (Sonaecom)
- NOWO (Digi Communications)
- Vodafone (Vodafone Plc.)

=== Mobile operators ===
- MEO (PT/Altice)
- NOS (Sonaecom)
- DIGI (Digi Communications)
- Vodafone (Vodafone Plc.)

== Romania ==
=== Fixed-line operators ===
- Digi
- Orange Romania (Orange)
- Vodafone Romania (Vodafone)

=== Mobile operators ===
- Digi
- Orange Romania (Orange)
- Vodafone Romania (Vodafone)
- Telekom Romania Mobile (Deutsche Telekom)

== Russia ==
=== Fixed-line operators ===
- VimpelCom
- MegaFon
- MTS
- MGTS
- Rostelecom
- ER-Telecom

=== Mobile operators ===
- Beeline Russia (VEON)
- MegaFon/Yota (USM Holdings)
- MTS (Sistema)
- t2 (Rostelecom)
- MOVTIV

== Serbia ==
=== Fixed-line operators ===
- mts (Serbian Government & Telekom Srbija group)
- A1 Srbija (Telekom Austria Group)
- Yettel (Yettel Serbia)
- Serbia Broadband (e& PPF Telecom Group)
- Orion telekom

=== Mobile operators ===
- mts (Serbian Government & Telekom Srbija group)
- A1 Srbija (Telekom Austria Group)
- Yettel (Yettel Serbia)

== Slovakia ==
=== Fixed-line operators ===
- Slovak Telekom (Deutsche Telekom)
- GTS Slovakia
- Orange Slovensko (Orange)
- UPC Slovakia (UPC Broadband)
- O2 Slovakia (e& PPF Telecom Group)

=== Mobile operators ===
- Slovak Telekom (Deutsche Telekom)
- Orange Slovensko (Orange)
- O2 Slovakia (e& PPF Telecom Group)
- 4KA (SWAN mobile)

== Slovenia ==
=== Fixed-line operators ===
- Telekom Slovenije
- A1 Slovenija (Telekom Austria Group)
- Mega M
- T-2
- Telemach (Telemach (Slovenia))

=== Mobile operators ===
- Mobitel (Telekom Slovenije)
- A1 Slovenija (Telekom Austria Group)
- Telemach (Telemach (Slovenia))
- T-2

== Spain ==
=== Fixed-line operators ===
- Movistar (Telefónica)
- Orange (MásOrange)
- Vodafone (Zegona Communications)
- Digi (Digi Communications))

=== Mobile operators ===
- Movistar (Telefónica)
- Orange (MásOrange)
- Vodafone (Zegona Communications)
- Digi (Digi Communications))

== Sweden ==
=== Fixed-line operators ===
- Telia Company
- Tele2
- Telenor
- Bredband2
- Rix Telecom
- Vattenfall
- Sky Broadband

=== Mobile operators ===
- Tele2
  - Tango (Tele2)
- Telenor Sverige (Telenor)
  - Glocalnet (Telenor)
  - NewPhone (Telenor)
- Telia (Telia Company)
  - Halebop (Telia)
- Lyca Mobile
- 3 (CK Hutchison Holdings)
- Nordisk Mobiltelefon
- GT Mobile
- Swedfone

== Switzerland ==
=== Fixed-line operators ===
- Swisscom
- Sunrise
- Salt

=== Mobile operators ===
- Swisscom
- Sunrise
- Salt Mobile

== Turkey ==
=== Fixed-line operators ===
- Türk Telekom
- Turkcell
- Vodafone (Vodafone Plc.)

=== Mobile operators ===
- Türk Telekom
- Turkcell
- Vodafone (Vodafone Plc.)

== Ukraine ==
=== Fixed-line operators ===
- Ukrtelecom
- Vodafone Ukraine
- Kyivstar (VEON)
- Volia (https://volia.com)

=== Mobile operators ===
- Kyivstar (VEON)
- Lifecell (Turkcell)
- Vodafone Ukraine (NEQSOL Holding, Azerbaijan (100%))
- Intertelecom (Intertelecom)
- UMobile (formerly 3 Mob) (Ukrtelecom)
- Lycamobile, (MVNO, UK (100%))

== United Kingdom ==
=== Fixed-line operators ===
- B4RN
- BT (BT Group)
- EE (BT Group)
- Hyperoptic (KKR)
- KCOM (Macquarie Group)
- Plusnet (BT Group)
- Sky (Sky Group)
- TalkTalk (Toscafund Asset Management)
- Virgin Media (Virgin Media O2)
- Vodafone (VodafoneThree)
- WightFibre
- Zen Internet

=== Mobile operators ===
- EE (BT Group)
- O2 (Virgin Media O2)
- Three (VodafoneThree)
- Vodafone (VodafoneThree)

== See also ==
- Telephone company
- List of telecommunications companies
  - List of telecommunications companies in the Americas
  - List of telecommunications companies in the Middle East and Africa
- List of mobile network operators
  - List of mobile network operators of the Americas
  - List of mobile network operators in Asia and Oceania
  - List of mobile network operators in Europe
  - List of mobile network operators in the Middle East and Africa
