= List of mobile network operators =

For a more comprehensive list of mobile phone operators, see Mobile country codes.

== Terrestrial ==
This is a list of the world's 25 largest terrestrial mobile phone network operators measured by number of subscriptions.

Rank	Company	Main markets	Technology	Total subscriptions (in millions)	Ownership (100% ownership unless stated otherwise)
1	China Mobile; Communications Corporation	China (China Mobile); Hong Kong (CMHK); Pakistan (Zong)	List: GSM, GPRS, EDGE, TD-SCDMA, TD-HSDPA, TD-LTE, FD-LTE (Hong Kong only), 4G+, 5G	1003.9 (September 2024)	Government of the People's Republic of China (74.25%); Public stock (25.75%)
2	(India) Bharti Airtel Limited	List: India (Airtel); Chad (Airtel); DR Congo (Airtel); Gabon (Airtel); Kenya (Airtel Kenya); Madagascar (Airtel); Malawi (Airtel); Niger (Airtel); Nigeria (Airtel); Republic of the Congo (Airtel); Rwanda (Airtel); Seychelles (Airtel); Tanzania (Airtel Tanzania); Uganda (Airtel Uganda); Zambia (Airtel)	List: GSM, GPRS, EDGE, HSPA, UMTS, HSPA+, LTE, TD-LTE, FD-LTE, LTE Advanced, 5G	650 (April 2026)	Bharti Enterprises (66.57%); Singtel (32.15%); Google (1.28%)
3	(India) Reliance Jio Infocomm Limited	India	List: LTE, TD-LTE, FD-LTE, LTE Advanced, 5G NR	524.0 (June 2026)	Jio Platforms
4	China Telecom Corp., Ltd	China; Macau	List: CDMA, EV-DO; TD-LTE, LTE, 4G+, 5G	423.4 (September 2024)	China Telecommunications Corporation (State Owned) (70.89%)
5	(United Kingdom) Vodafone Group plc	List: Albania (Vodafone); Australia (Vodafone); Czech Republic (Vodafone); (Democratic Republic of the Congo) Democratic Republic of Congo (Vodacom); Egypt (Vodafone); Ethiopia (Safaricom); Germany (Vodafone); Greece (Vodafone); (Republic of Ireland) Ireland (Vodafone); Lesotho (Vodacom); Mozambique (Vodacom); Kenya (Safaricom); Netherlands (Vodafone); Northern Cyprus (Vodafone); Portugal (Vodafone); Romania (Vodafone); South Africa (Vodacom); Tanzania (Vodacom); Turkey (Vodafone); United Kingdom (Vodafone)	List: GSM, GPRS, EDGE, HSPA, HSPA+, LTE, LTE Advanced, 5G	355.0 (May 2026)	
6	China Unicom Limited	China	List: GSM, GPRS, EDGE, UMTS, TD-LTE, LTE, 4G+, 5G	345.0 (September 2024)	China Unicom Limited (40.92%); China Netcom Group (29.49%)
7	(Mexico) América Móvil, S.A.B. de C.V	List: Argentina (Claro); Austria (Telekom Austria); Belarus (A1); Brazil (Claro); Bulgaria (A1); Chile (Claro); Colombia (Claro); Costa Rica (Claro); Croatia (A1); Dominican Republic (Claro); Ecuador (Claro); El Salvador (Claro); Guatemala (Claro); Honduras (Claro); Mexico (Telcel); Nicaragua (Claro); North Macedonia (A1); Paraguay (Claro); Peru (Claro); Puerto Rico (Claro); Serbia (A1); Slovenia (A1 Slovenija); Uruguay (Claro)	List: D-AMPS, cdmaOne, CDMA2000 1x, EV-DO, GSM, GPRS, EDGE, UMTS, HSPA+, LTE	315.8 (September 2024)	Helu Slim (36.50%); Carlos Slim (6.84%); Public stock (56.66%)
8	(France) Orange S.A.	List: Belgium (Orange); Botswana (Orange); Cameroon (Orange); Central African Republic (Orange); Democratic Republic of the Congo (Orange); Dominican Republic (Orange); Egypt (Orange); Equatorial Guinea (Orange); France (Orange); Guinea (Sonatel); Guinea-Bissau (Sonatel); Ivory Coast; Jordan (Orange); Kenya (Orange); Luxembourg; Madagascar (Orange); Mali (Orange); Moldova (Orange); Morocco (Orange); Niger (Orange); Poland (Orange); Romania (Orange); Senegal (Orange) (50%); Slovakia (Orange); Spain (Orange); Tunisia (Orange)	List: GSM, GPRS, EDGE, UMTS, HSDPA, HSPA+, LTE	256.4 (February 2026)	Public stock (68.1%); Government of France (13.4%)
9	(Spain) Telefónica S.A.	List: Brazil (Vivo); Germany (O_{2}); Mexico (Movistar); Spain (Movistar); United Kingdom (O_{2}); Venezuela (Movistar)	List: D-AMPS, cdmaOne, CDMA2000, GSM, GPRS, EDGE, UMTS, HSDPA, LTE	249.3 (February 2025)	Public stock (62.2%); Government of Spain (10%); Saudi Telecom (5%); BBVA (5%)
10	(South Africa) MTN Group Limited	List: Benin; Botswana; Cameroon; Republic of the Congo; Eswatini (30%); Ghana; Guinea; Iran (49%); Ivory Coast; Liberia; Nigeria; Rwanda; South Africa; South Sudan; Sudan; Uganda; Zambia	List: GSM, GPRS, EDGE, HSPA, HSPA+, LTE, LTE-A, LTE-A Pro, 5G NR, 5G	288.0 (September 2024)	Public stock (60.02%); Government Employees Pension Fund (25.33%); M1 (10.05%)
11	(Germany) Deutsche Telekom AG	List: Austria (Magenta Telekom); Croatia (Hrvatski Telekom); Czech Republic (T-Mobile CZ); Germany (Deutsche Telekom); Greece (Cosmote); Hungary (Magyar Telekom); Montenegro (Crnogorski Telekom); North Macedonia (Makedonski Telekom); Poland (T-Mobile PL); Puerto Rico (T-Mobile US); Slovakia (Slovak Telekom); United States (T-Mobile US); United States Virgin Islands (T-Mobile US)	List: GSM, GPRS, EDGE, UMTS, HSPA, HSPA+, DC-HSPA+, LTE, LTE-A, LTE-A Pro, 5G NR	258.8 (September 2024)	Free float (62.3%); Federal Republic of Germany (27.5%)
12	(Italy) TIM S.p.A.	List: Italy (TIM); San Marino (TIM San Marino); Brazil (TIM Brasil)	List: GSM, GPRS, EDGE, LTE, LTE-A, 5G NR, 5G; VoLTE, VoWiFi, AML	84.5 (Q3 2026)	Poste Italiane S.p.A. (24.81%)
13	(Romania) Digi Communications N.V	List: Romania (Digi); Spain (Digi); Italy (Digi); Belgium (Digi); Portugal (Digi); United Kingdom (Digi)	List: GSM, GPRS, EDGE, LTE, LTE Advanced, VoLTE, VoWiFi, 5G, 5G NR	33.9 (Q2 2026)	RCS Management S.A. (89.64%)
14	(India) Vodafone Idea Ltd	India	List: GSM, GPRS, EDGE, UMTS, HSPA, HSPA+, LTE, TD-LTE, FD-LTE, LTE Advanced, 5G	199.57 (July 2026)	Government of India (49%); Vodafone Group Plc (15.4%); Aditya Birla Group (9.85%)
15	(Netherlands) E& PPF Telecom Group	List: Bulgaria (Yettel); Hungary (Yettel); Serbia (Yettel); Slovakia (O2)	List: GSM, GPRS, EDGE, UMTS, HSPA, HSPA+, LTE, LTE-A, 5G NR	14.4 (December 2025)	e& (50%) PPF Group (50%)
16	(Malaysia) Axiata Group Berhad	List: Bangladesh (Robi); Cambodia (Smart); Indonesia (XLSmart); Malaysia (CelcomDigi); Sri Lanka (Dialog)	List: GSM, GPRS, EDGE, UMTS, HSDPA, HSPA+, LTE, LTE-A, 5G NR	162.5 (December 2023)	Public stock (54.91%); Government of Malaysia (45.09%)
17	(Indonesia) PT Telekomunikasi Selular (Telkomsel)	Indonesia (Timor-Leste) East Timor (Telkomcel)	List: GSM, GPRS, EDGE, UMTS, HSDPA, HSPA+, LTE, 5G	159.3 (December 2023)	Telkom Indonesia (65%); Singtel (35%)
18	(United Arab Emirates) Emirates Telecommunication; Group Company PJSC (Etisalat)	List: Afghanistan (Etisalat); Benin (Moov); Burkina Faso (Moov); Central African Republic (Moov); Chad (Moov); Egypt (e& Egypt); Gabon (Moov); (Ivory Coast) Côte d'Ivoire (Moov); Mali (Sotelma); Mauritania (Mauritel); Morocco (Maroc Telecom); Niger (Moov); Pakistan (Ufone); Saudi Arabia (Mobily); Togo (Moov); United Arab Emirates (e&)	List: GSM, GPRS, EDGE, UMTS, HSDPA, LTE	159 (2021)	Emirates Investment Authority (60.03%); Public stock (39.97%)
19	(United Arab Emirates) VEON Ltd.	List: Bangladesh (Banglalink); Kazakhstan (Beeline); Kyrgyzstan (Beeline); Pakistan (Jazz); Ukraine (Kyivstar); Uzbekistan (Beeline)	List: GSM, GPRS, EDGE, UMTS, HSDPA, HSPA+, LTE	153.9 (December 2024)	Letterone Investment Holdings S.A. (45.5%); The Stichting Administratiekantoor Mobile Telecommunications Investor (7.9%); Lingotto Investment Management LLP (7.8%); Shah Capital Management Inc. (6.7%)
20	(Qatar) Ooredoo QSC	List: Algeria (Ooredoo); Indonesia (Indosat); Iraq (Asiacell); Kuwait (Ooredoo); Maldives Ooredoo; Oman (Ooredoo); Palestine (Ooredoo); Qatar (Ooredoo); Tunisia (Ooredoo)	List: CDMA, EV-DO, GSM, GPRS, EDGE, UMTS, HSDPA, HSPA+, LTE	149.4 (Q3 2024)	Government of Qatar
21	(United States) Verizon Communications	United States; United States Virgin Islands; Puerto Rico	List: HSDPA, HSPA+, LTE, LTE-Advanced, LTE-A Pro, 5G NR	146 (December 2024)	Verizon Communications
22	(United States) AT&T Inc.	United States (AT&T Mobility LLC); Mexico (AT&T Mexico)	List: HSDPA, HSPA+, LTE, LTE-Advanced, LTE-A Pro, 5G NR	139.0 (September 2024)	Institutional Shares (59.28%); Vanguard Group Inc (14.12%); Blackrock Inc (11.49%)
23	(Norway) Telenor ASA	List: Bangladesh (Grameenphone); Denmark (Telenor); Finland (DNA PLC); Norway (Telenor); Pakistan (Telenor); Sweden (Telenor)	List: GSM, GPRS, EDGE, UMTS, HSDPA, LTE, LTE-A, 5G NR	138.31 (Q3 2024)	Government of Norway (53.97%); Public stock (41.74%); The Government Pension Fund of Norway (4.79%)
24	(Vietnam) Viettel Group	List: Burundi (Lumitel); Cambodia (Metfone); Cameroon (Nexttel); (Timor-Leste) East Timor (Telemor); Haiti (Natcom); Laos (Unitel); Mozambique (Movitel); Myanmar (Mytel); Peru (Bitel); Tanzania (Halotel); Vietnam	List: CDMA, GSM, GPRS, EDGE, UMTS, HSDPA, HSPA+, LTE; 5G NR	110.0 (Q1 2022)	Government of Vietnam
25	(India) BSNL Mobile	India	List: GSM, GPRS, EDGE, UMTS, HSPA, HSDPA, TD-HSDPA, HSPA+; , LTE, TD-LTE, FD-LTE, LTE Advanced, 5G	91.74	Government of India
26	(Japan) NTT Docomo Inc.	Japan	List: UMTS, HSPA, HSPA+, LTE, TD-LTE, FD-LTE, LTE Advanced	91.4 (Q3 2025)	Nippon Telegraph and Telephone
27	(Russia) Mobile TeleSystems (MTS)	Russia; Belarus	List: GSM, GPRS, EDGE, UMTS, LTE, 5G NR	87.60 (Q3 2024)	Sistema (50.8%)
28	(Russia) MegaFon	Russia; Tajikistan	List: GSM, GPRS, EDGE, UMTS, HSDPA; LTE, LTE Advanced	77.26 (Q2 2024)	AF Telecom Holding LLC (56.32%); USM Telecom LLC (43.68%)

== Satellite based ==
This is a list of the world's five largest satellite phone network operators measured by number of subscribers.

Rank	Operator	Technology	Subscribers (in millions)	Ownership
1	Iridium	Proprietary TDMA	0.824 (June 2016)	
2	Globalstar	Proprietary CDMA	0.638 (March 2015)	
3	Thuraya	Proprietary FDMA/GSM	0.260 (December 2007)	Etisalat (28%)
4	Inmarsat	Proprietary GSM	0.254 (September 2009)	
5	ACeS	Dual-mode Satellite/GSM	0.020 (December 2007)	

== See also ==
- General
  - Comparison of mobile phone standards
- Operators
  - List of mobile network operators in Europe
  - List of mobile network operators in Asia and Oceania
  - List of mobile network operators in the Middle East and Africa
  - List of mobile network operators of the Americas
    - List of mobile network operators of the Caribbean
- Country lists
  - List of sovereign states by number of broadband Internet subscriptions
  - List of countries by number of Internet users
  - List of countries by number of telephone lines in use
  - List of countries by smartphone penetration
  - List of multiple-system operators
- List of telecommunications companies
  - List of telecommunications companies in the Americas
  - List of telecommunications companies in Asia and Oceania
  - List of telecommunications companies in Europe
  - List of telecommunications companies in the Middle East and Africa
