= 3G =

Third-generation mobile telecommunications standard

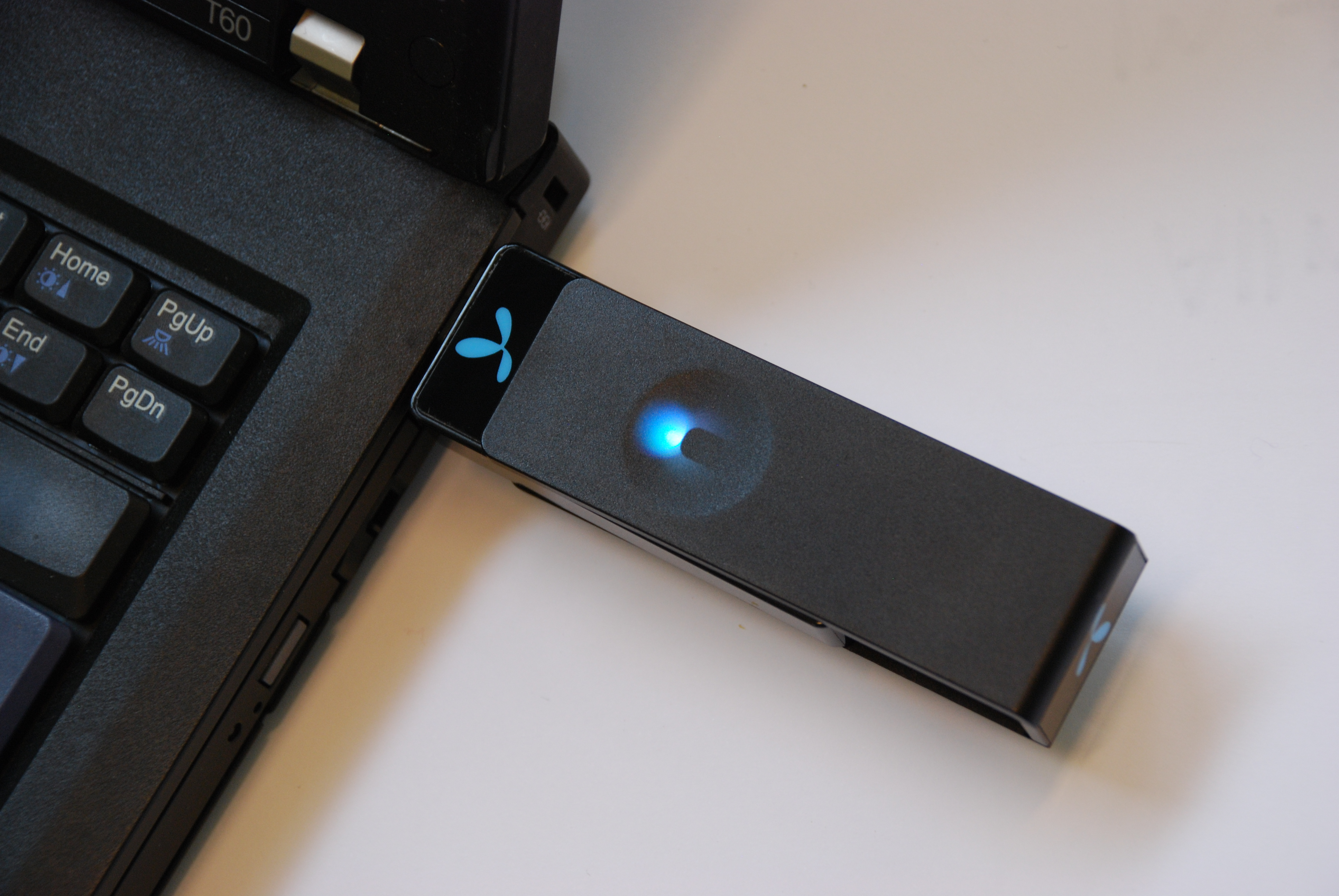
A USB modem for 3G plugged into a laptop.

3G is the third generation of cellular network technology. These networks were rolled out beginning in the early 2000s and represented a significant advancement over the second generation (2G) and associated technologies, such as GSM and cdmaOne, particularly in terms of data transfer speeds and mobile internet capabilities. The major 3G standards are UMTS (developed by 3GPP) and CDMA2000 (developed by Qualcomm); both of these are based on the IMT-2000 specifications established by the International Telecommunication Union (ITU).

While 2G networks such as GPRS and EDGE supported limited data services, 3G introduced significantly higher-speed mobile internet and enhanced multimedia capabilities, in addition to improved voice quality. It provided moderate internet speeds suitable for general web browsing and multimedia content including video calling and mobile TV, supporting services that provide an information transfer rate of at least 144 kbit/s.

Later 3G releases, often referred to as 3.5G (HSPA) and 3.75G (HSPA+) as well as EV-DO, introduced important improvements, enabling 3G networks to offer mobile broadband access with speeds ranging from several Mbit/s up to 42 Mbit/s. These updates improved the reliability and speed of internet browsing, video streaming, and online gaming, enhancing the overall user experience for smartphones and mobile modems in comparison to earlier 3G technologies. 3G was later succeeded by 4G technology, which provided even higher data transfer rates and introduced advancements in network performance.

== Overview ==
=== Context ===
A new generation of cellular standards has emerged roughly every decade since the introduction of 1G systems in 1979. Each generation is defined by the introduction of new frequency bands, higher data rates, and transmission technologies that are not backward-compatible due to the need for significant changes in network architecture and infrastructure.

=== Standards ===
Several telecommunications companies marketed wireless mobile Internet services as 3G, indicating that the advertised service was provided over a 3G wireless network. However, 3G services have largely been supplanted in marketing by 4G and 5G services in most areas of the world. Services advertised as 3G are required to meet IMT-2000 technical standards, including standards for reliability and speed (data transfer rates). To meet the IMT-2000 standards, Third-generation mobile networks, or 3G, must maintain minimum consistent Internet speeds of 144 Kbps. However, many services advertised as 3G provide higher speed than the minimum technical requirements for a 3G service. Subsequent 3G releases, denoted 3.5G and 3.75G, provided mobile broadband access of several Mbit/s for smartphones and mobile modems in laptop computers.

3G branded standards:

- The UMTS (Universal Mobile Telecommunications System) system, standardized by 3GPP in 2001, was used in Europe, Japan, China (with a different radio interface) and other regions predominated by GSM (Global Systems for Mobile Communications) 2G system infrastructure. The cell phones are typically UMTS and GSM hybrids. Several radio interfaces are offered, sharing the same infrastructure:
  - The original and most widespread radio interface is called W-CDMA (Wideband Code Division Multiple Access).
  - The TD-SCDMA radio interface was commercialized in 2009 and only offered in China.
  - The latest UMTS release, HSPA+, can provide peak data rates up to 56 Mbit/s in the downlink in theory (28 Mbit/s in existing services) and 22 Mbit/s in the uplink.
- The CDMA2000 system, first offered in 2002, standardized by 3GPP2, used especially in North America and South Korea, sharing infrastructure with the IS-95 2G standard. The cell phones are typically CDMA2000 and IS-95 hybrids. The latest release EVDO Rev. B offers peak rates of 14.7 Mbit/s downstream.

The 3G systems and radio interfaces are based on spread spectrum radio transmission technology. While the GSM EDGE standard ("2.9G"), DECT cordless phones and Mobile WiMAX standards formally also fulfill the IMT-2000 requirements and are approved as 3G standards by ITU, these are typically not branded as 3G and are based on completely different technologies.

The common standards complying with the IMT2000/3G standard are:

- EDGE, a revision by the 3GPP organization to the older 2G GSM based transmission methods, which utilizes the same switching nodes, base station sites, and frequencies as GPRS, but includes a new base station and cellphone RF circuits. It is based on the three times as efficient 8PSK modulation scheme as a supplement to the original GMSK modulation scheme. EDGE is still used extensively due to its ease of upgrade from existing 2G GSM infrastructure and cell phones.
  - EDGE combined with the GPRS 2.5G technology is called EGPRS, and allows peak data rates in the order of 200 kbit/s, just like the original UMTS WCDMA versions and thus formally fulfill the IMT2000 requirements on 3G systems. However, in practice, EDGE is seldom marketed as a 3G system, but a 2.9G system. EDGE shows slightly better system spectral efficiency than the original UMTS and CDMA2000 systems, but it is difficult to reach much higher peak data rates due to the limited GSM spectral bandwidth of 200 kHz, and it is thus a dead end.
  - EDGE was also a mode in the IS-136 TDMA system, no longer used.
  - Evolved EDGE, the latest revision, has peaks of 1 Mbit/s downstream and 400 kbit/s upstream but is not commercially used.
- The Universal Mobile Telecommunications System, created and revised by the 3GPP. The family is a full revision from GSM in terms of encoding methods and hardware, although some GSM sites can be retrofitted to broadcast in the UMTS/W-CDMA format.
  - W-CDMA is the most common deployment, commonly operated on the 2,100 MHz band. A few others use the 850, 900, and 1,900 MHz bands.
    - HSPA is an amalgamation of several upgrades to the original W-CDMA standard and offers speeds of 14.4 Mbit/s down and 5.76 Mbit/s up. HSPA is backward-compatible and uses the same frequencies as W-CDMA.
    - HSPA+, a further revision and upgrade of HSPA, can provide theoretical peak data rates up to 168 Mbit/s in the downlink and 22 Mbit/s in the uplink, using a combination of air interface improvements as well as multi-carrier HSPA and MIMO. Technically though, MIMO and DC-HSPA can be used without the "+" enhancements of HSPA+.
- The CDMA2000 system, or IS-2000, including CDMA2000 1x and CDMA2000 High Rate Packet Data (or EVDO), standardized by 3GPP2 (differing from the 3GPP), evolving from the original IS-95 CDMA system, is used especially in North America, China, India, Pakistan, Japan, South Korea, Southeast Asia, Europe, and Africa.
  - CDMA2000 1x Rev. E has an increased voice capacity (by three times the original amount) compared to Rev. 0 EVDO Rev. B offers downstream peak rates of 14.7 Mbit/s while Rev. C enhanced existing and new terminal user experience.

While DECT cordless phones and Mobile WiMAX standards formally also fulfill the IMT-2000 requirements, they are not usually considered due to their rarity and unsuitability for usage with mobile phones.

=== Break-up of 3G systems ===
The 3G (UMTS and CDMA2000) research and development projects started in 1992. In 1999, ITU approved five radio interfaces for IMT-2000 as a part of the ITU-R M.1457 Recommendation; WiMAX was added in 2007.

There are evolutionary standards (EDGE and CDMA) that are backward-compatible extensions to pre-existing 2G networks as well as revolutionary standards that require all-new network hardware and frequency allocations. The cell phones use UMTS in combination with 2G GSM standards and bandwidths, but do not support EDGE. The latter group is the UMTS family, which consists of standards developed for IMT-2000, as well as the independently developed standards DECT and WiMAX, which were included because they fit the IMT-2000 definition.

While EDGE fulfills the 3G specifications, most GSM/UMTS phones report EDGE ("2.75G") and UMTS ("3G") functionality.

== History ==
Cellular network standards and generation timeline.

3G technology was the result of research and development work carried out by the International Telecommunication Union (ITU) in the early 1980s. 3G specifications and standards were developed in fifteen years. The technical specifications were made available to the public under the name IMT-2000. The communication spectrum between 400 MHz to 3 GHz was allocated for 3G. Both the government and communication companies approved the 3G standard. The first pre-commercial 3G network was launched by NTT DoCoMo in Japan in 1998, branded as FOMA. It was first available in May 2001 as a pre-release (test) of W-CDMA technology. The first commercial launch of 3G was also by NTT DoCoMo in Japan on 1 October 2001, although it was initially somewhat limited in scope; broader availability of the system was delayed by apparent concerns over its reliability.

The first European pre-commercial network was an UMTS network on the Isle of Man by Manx Telecom, the operator then owned by British Telecom, and the first commercial network (also UMTS based W-CDMA) in Europe was opened for business by Telenor in December 2001 with no commercial handsets and thus no paying customers.

The first network to go commercially live was by SK Telecom in South Korea on the CDMA-based 1xEV-DO technology in January 2002. By May 2002, the second South Korean 3G network was by KT on EV-DO and thus the South Koreans were the first to see competition among 3G operators.

The first commercial United States 3G network was by Monet Mobile Networks, on CDMA2000 1x EV-DO technology, but the network provider later shut down operations. The second 3G network operator in the US was Verizon Wireless in July 2002, also on CDMA2000 1x EV-DO. AT&T Mobility was also a true 3G UMTS network, having completed its upgrade of the 3G network to HSUPA.

The first commercial United Kingdom 3G network was started by Hutchison Telecom which was originally behind Orange S.A. In 2003, it announced first commercial third generation or 3G mobile phone network in the UK.

The first pre-commercial demonstration network in the southern hemisphere was built in Adelaide, South Australia, by m.Net Corporation in February 2002 using UMTS on 2100 MHz. This was a demonstration network for the 2002 IT World Congress. The first commercial 3G network was launched by Hutchison Telecommunications branded as Three or "3" in June 2003.

In India, on 11 December 2008, the first 3G mobile and internet services were launched by a state-owned company, Mahanagar Telecom Nigam Limited (MTNL), within the metropolitan cities of Delhi and Mumbai. After MTNL, another state-owned company, Bharat Sanchar Nigam Limited (BSNL), began deploying the 3G networks country-wide.

Emtel launched the first 3G network in Africa.

=== Adoption ===
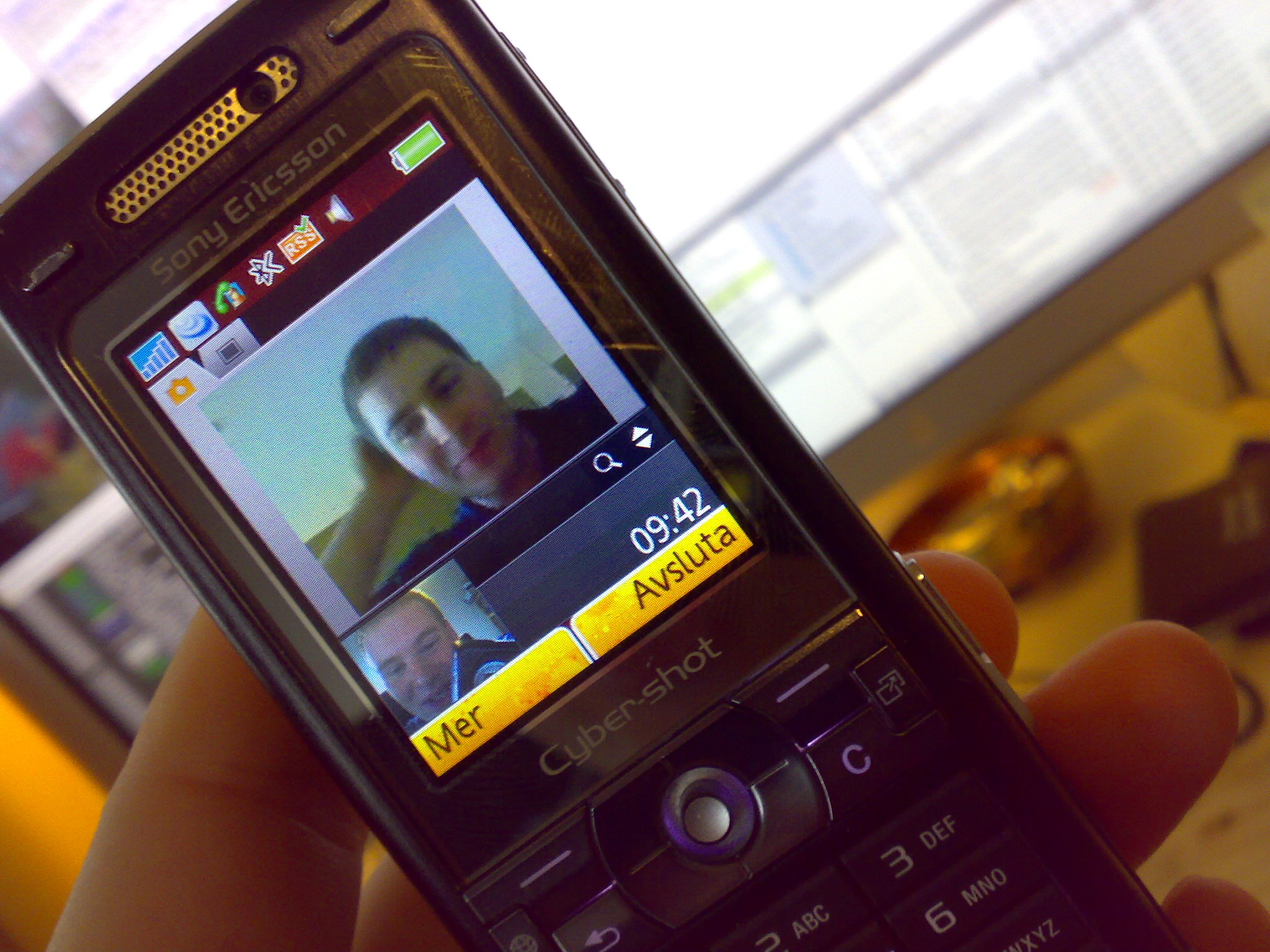
Videotelephony through cellular networks were made possible using 3G technologies

Japan was one of the first countries to adopt 3G, the reason being the process of 3G spectrum allocation, which in Japan was awarded without much upfront cost. The frequency spectrum was allocated in the US and Europe based on auctioning, thereby requiring a huge initial investment for any company wishing to provide 3G services. European companies collectively paid over 100 billion dollars in their spectrum auctions.

Nepal Telecom adopted 3G Service for the first time in southern Asia. However, its 3G was relatively slow to be adopted in Nepal. In some instances, 3G networks do not use the same radio frequencies as 2G, so mobile operators must build entirely new networks and license entirely new frequencies, especially to achieve high data transmission rates. Other countries' delays were due to the expenses of upgrading transmission hardware, especially for UMTS, whose deployment required the replacement of most broadcast towers. Due to these issues and difficulties with deployment, many carriers could not or delayed the acquisition of these updated capabilities.

In December 2007, 190 3G networks were operating in 40 countries and 154 HSDPA networks were operating in 71 countries, according to the Global Mobile Suppliers Association (GSA). In Asia, Europe, Canada, and the US, telecommunication companies use W-CDMA technology with the support of around 100 terminal designs to operate 3G mobile networks.

The roll-out of 3G networks was delayed by the enormous costs of additional spectrum licensing fees in some countries. The license fees in some European countries were particularly high, bolstered by government auctions of a limited number of licenses and sealed bid auctions, and initial excitement over 3G's potential. This led to a telecoms crash that ran concurrently with similar crashes in the fibre-optic and dot.com fields.

The 3G standard is perhaps well known because of a massive expansion of the mobile communications market post-2G and advances of the consumer mobile phone. An especially notable development during this time is the smartphone (for example, the iPhone, and the Android family), combining the abilities of a PDA with a mobile phone, leading to widespread demand for mobile internet connectivity. 3G has also introduced the term "mobile broadband" because its speed and capability made it a viable alternative for internet browsing, and USB Modems connecting to 3G networks, and now 4G became increasingly common.

=== Market penetration ===
By June 2007, the 200 millionth 3G subscriber had been connected of which 10 million were in Nepal and 8.2 million in India. This 200 millionth is only 6.7% of the 3 billion mobile phone subscriptions worldwide. (When counting CDMA2000 1x RTT customers—max bitrate 72% of the 200 kbit/s which defines 3G—the total size of the nearly-3G subscriber base was 475 million as of June 2007, which was 15.8% of all subscribers worldwide.) In the countries where 3G was launched first – Japan and South Korea – 3G penetration is over 70%. In Europe the leading country for 3G penetration is Italy with a third of its subscribers migrated to 3G. Other leading countries for 3G use include Nepal, UK, Austria, Australia and Singapore at the 32% migration level.

According to ITU estimates, as of Q4 2012 there were 2096 million active mobile-broadband subscribers worldwide out of a total of 6835 million subscribers—this is just over 30%. About half the mobile-broadband subscriptions are for subscribers in developed nations, 934 million out of 1600 million total, well over 50%. Note however that there is a distinction between a phone with mobile-broadband connectivity and a smart phone with a large display and so on—although according to the ITU and informatandm.com the US has 321 million mobile subscriptions, including 256 million that are 3G or 4G, which is both 80% of the subscriber base and 80% of the US population, according to ComScore just a year earlier in Q4 2011 only about 42% of people surveyed in the US reported they owned a smart phone. In Japan, 3G penetration was similar at about 81%, but smart phone ownership was lower at about 17%. In China, there were 486.5 million 3G subscribers in June 2014, in a population of 1,385,566,537 (2013 UN estimate).

=== Decline and decommissions ===
Since the increasing adoption of 4G networks across the globe, 3G use has been in decline. Several operators around the world have already or are in the process of shutting down their 3G networks (see table below). In several places, 3G is being shut down while its older predecessor 2G is being kept in operation; Vodafone UK is doing this, citing 2G's usefulness as a low-power fallback. EE in the UK, plans to switch off their 3G networks in early 2024. In the US, Verizon shutdown their 3G services on 31 December 2022, T-Mobile shut down Sprint's networks on 31 Mar 2022 and shutdown their main networks on 1 July 2022, and AT&T has done so on 22 February 2022. According to Telenor IoT, 3G sunsets outpace 2G in Europe, where 19 operators in 14 countries plan to phase out 3G by 2025. Only 8 operators in 8 nations are scheduled to shut down their 2G networks by the same year however.

Currently 3G around the world is declining in availability and support. Technology that depends on 3G for usage are becoming inoperable in many places. For example, the European Union plans to ensure that member countries maintain 2G networks as a fallback, so 3G devices that are backwards compatible with 2G frequencies can continue to be used. However, in countries that plan to decommission 2G networks or have already done so as well, such as the United States and Singapore, devices supporting only 3G and backwards compatible with 2G are becoming inoperable. As of February 2022, less than 1% of cell phone customers in the United States used 3G; AT&T offered free replacement devices to some customers in the run-up to its shutdown.

== Patents ==
It has been estimated that there are almost 8,000 patents declared essential (FRAND) related to the 483 technical specifications which form the 3GPP and 3GPP2 standards. Twelve companies accounted in 2004 for 90% of the patents (Qualcomm, Ericsson, Nokia, Motorola, Philips, NTT DoCoMo, Siemens, Mitsubishi, Fujitsu, Hitachi, InterDigital, and Matsushita).

Even then, some patents essential to 3G might not have been declared by their patent holders. It is believed that Nortel and Lucent have undisclosed patents essential to these standards.

Furthermore, the existing 3G Patent Platform Partnership Patent pool has little impact on FRAND protection because it excludes the four largest patent owners for 3G.

== Features ==
=== Data rates ===
ITU has not provided a clear definition of the data rate that users can expect from 3G equipment or providers. Thus users sold 3G service may not be able to point to a standard and say that the rates it specifies are not being met. While stating in commentary that "it is expected that IMT-2000 will provide higher transmission rates: a minimum data rate of 2 Mbit/s for stationary or walking users, and 348 kbit/s in a moving vehicle," the ITU does not actually clearly specify minimum required rates, nor required average rates, nor what modes of the interfaces qualify as 3G, so various data rates are sold as '3G' in the market.

In a market implementation, 3G downlink data speeds defined by telecom service providers vary depending on the underlying technology deployed; up to 384 kbit/s for UMTS (WCDMA), up to 7.2 Mbit/s for HSPA, and a theoretical maximum of 21.1 Mbit/s for HSPA+ and 42.2 Mbit/s for DC-HSPA+ (technically 3.5G, but usually clubbed under the tradename of 3G).

=== Security ===
3G networks offer greater security than their 2G predecessors. By allowing the UE (User Equipment) to authenticate the network it is attaching to, the user can be sure the network is the intended one and not an impersonator.

3G networks use the KASUMI block cipher instead of the older A5/1 stream cipher. However, a number of serious weaknesses in the KASUMI cipher have been identified.

In addition to the 3G network infrastructure security, end-to-end security is offered when application frameworks such as IMS are accessed, although this is not strictly a 3G property.

=== Applications of 3G ===
The bandwidth and location capabilities introduced by 3G networks enabled a wide range of applications that were previously impractical or unavailable on 2G networks. Among the most significant advancements was the ability to perform data-intensive tasks, such as browsing the internet seamlessly while on the move, as well as engaging in other activities that benefited from faster data speeds and enhanced reliability.

Beyond personal communication, 3G networks supported applications in various fields, including medical devices, fire alarms, and ankle monitors. This versatility marked a significant milestone in cellular communications, as 3G became the first network to enable such a broad range of use cases. By expanding its functionality beyond traditional mobile phone usage, 3G set the stage for the integration of cellular networks into a wide array of technologies and services, paving the way for further advancements with subsequent generations of mobile networks.

== Evolution ==
Both 3GPP and 3GPP2 are working on the extensions to 3G standards that are based on an all-IP network infrastructure and using advanced wireless technologies such as MIMO. These specifications already display features characteristic for IMT-Advanced (4G), the successor of 3G. However, falling short of the bandwidth requirements for 4G (which is 1 Gbit/s for stationary and 100 Mbit/s for mobile operation), these standards are classified as 3.9G or Pre-4G. 3GPP plans to meet the 4G goals with LTE Advanced, whereas Qualcomm has halted UMB development in favour of the LTE family.

On 14 December 2009, TeliaSonera announced in an official press release that "We are very proud to be the first operator in the world to offer our customers 4G services." With the launch of their LTE network, initially they are offering pre-4G (or beyond 3G) services in Stockholm, Sweden and Oslo, Norway.

== Phase-out ==
Country	Status	Network	Shutdown date	Standard	References	Notes
Albania		One	—N/a	UMTS		
Albania		Vodafone	2026-04-25	UMTS		Local shoutdown commenced on 25 Apr 2026.
Argentina		Personal	TBD	UMTS		Local shutdowns commenced in Q1 2023.
Australia	No Service	Optus	2024-10-28	UMTS		
Australia	No Service	Telstra	2024-10-28	UMTS		Service on 2100 MHz band ended on 25 Mar 2019.
Australia	No Service	TPG / Vodafone	2023-12-15	UMTS		
Austria	No Service	3	2024-12-31	UMTS		Local shutdowns commenced on 01 Jan 2024.
Austria	No Service	A1	2025-06-03	UMTS		Local shutdowns commenced on 01 Jan 2024.
Austria	No Service	Magenta Telekom	2024-06-30	UMTS		Local shutdowns commenced on 01 Jan 2024.
Belgium	No Service	Orange	2025-07-07	UMTS		Shutdown commenced in Jan 2024.
Belgium	No Service	Proximus	2024-12-31	UMTS		
Belgium	No Service	Telenet	2024-09-30	UMTS		Shutdown commenced in Sep 2024.
Canada		Bell	2027-03-01 (est.)	UMTS		Local shutdowns commenced on 31 Dec 2025.
Canada		Rogers	2025-08-07	UMTS		1900 MHz shutdown in Jun 2021. 850 MHz shutdown in Aug 2025.
Canada		Telus	2027-03-01 (est.)	UMTS		Local shutdowns commenced on 31 Dec 2025.
Canada		SaskTel	2027-10-01 (est.)	UMTS		
Canada		Videotron	2025-07-31	UMTS		
Canada		Freedom Mobile	2027-03-01 (est.)	UMTS		Local shutdowns commenced on 31 Dec 2025.
China		China Mobile	2019-12-31	TD-SCDMA		Shutdown commenced on 16 Mar 2016.
China		China Telecom	2023-12-31	CDMA2000		CDMA2000 1X, 1xEV-DO Rev. A/B; Shutdown commenced on 16 Jun 2020.
China	Limited; Service	China Unicom	2026-12-31 (est.)	UMTS		2100 MHz: 5 MHz W-CDMA; Mainly retained for 4G devices without VoLTE capability and IoT.
Colombia	Active	Claro	No shutdown date	UMTS		No official shutdown date has been released.
Colombia	Active	Tigo	No shutdown date	UMTS		No official shutdown date has been released.
Croatia		A1 Telekom	2026-07-06	UMTS		Shutdown commenced in Feb 2026.
Croatia		HT	2025-02-19	UMTS		Shutdown commenced in Dec 2023.
Croatia	Active	Telemach	—N/a	UMTS		
Czech Republic	No Service	O_{2}	2021-11-30	UMTS		
Czech Republic	No Service	T-Mobile	2021-11-30	UMTS		
Czech Republic	No Service	Vodafone	2021-03-31	UMTS		
Denmark	No Service	3	2025-12-01	UMTS		Local shutdown commenced in 2019.
Denmark	No Service	TDC	2022-12-31	UMTS		Local shutdown commenced in 2022.
Denmark	No Service	TT-Netværket (Telenor, Telia)	2023-03-20	UMTS		Service on the 2100 MHz band ended in 2021. Shutdown on the 900 MHz band commenced in summer 2022.
Estonia	No Service	Elisa	2024-11-26	UMTS		
Estonia	No Service	Tele2	2025-11-30	UMTS		
Estonia	No Service	Telia Eesti	2023-12-13	UMTS		
Finland	No Service	DNA	2024-01-25	UMTS		Local shutdowns commenced in May 2023.
Finland	No Service	Elisa	2023-11-30	UMTS		Local shutdowns commenced in Apr 2023.
Finland	No Service	Finnish Shared Network	2024-12	UMTS		Joint company by Telia and DNA to manage networks in Northern and Eastern Finland.
Finland	No Service	Telia	2024-10-28	UMTS		Local shutdowns commenced on 09 Sep 2023.
Aland	Active	Ålcom		UMTS		
France		Bouygues	2029-12-31 (est.)	UMTS		
France		Free Mobile	2025-12-15	UMTS		2G/3G-Roaming available via Orange network.
France		Orange	2028-12-31 (est.)	UMTS		
France		SFR	2028 (est.)	UMTS		
Germany	No Service	Deutsche Telekom	2021-07-01	UMTS		
Germany	No Service	O_{2}	2021-12-31	UMTS		
Germany	No Service	Vodafone	2021-06-30	UMTS		
Greece	No Service	Cosmote	2021-12-31	UMTS		
Greece	No Service	NOVA	2023-03-27	UMTS		
Greece	No Service	Vodafone	2023-05-31	UMTS		
Greenland		Tusass	TBD	UMTS		
Hong Kong	Active	3	—N/a	UMTS		
Hong Kong		CMHK	2025-06-30	UMTS		
Hong Kong		CSL	2017-10-31	CDMA2000		CDMA2000 1X, 1xEV-DO Rev. A. Service previously provided by PCCW. After acquisition of CSL by HKT, its mobile business PCCW Mobile was merged into CSL. No service for local customers, only served incoming roaming tourists. CSL terminated its CDMA family business two years before its licence expiry, and cdmaOne service has also terminated along with CDMA2000.
Hong Kong	Active	CSL	—N/a	UMTS		
Hong Kong		Smartone	2026-10-09	UMTS		
Hungary	No Service	Magyar Telekom	2022-06-30	UMTS		
Hungary	No Service	Yettel Hungary	2023-11-13	UMTS		
Hungary	No Service	Vodafone Hungary	2023-03-31	UMTS		
Iceland		Nova	2026 H1 (est.)	UMTS		
Iceland		Síminn	2026-03 (est.)	UMTS		
Iceland		Sýn	2026-03 (est.)	UMTS		
India		Airtel	2020-03-31	UMTS		
India		BSNL	TBD	UMTS		
India		Vodafone Idea	2022-10-06	UMTS		Complete network refarming to 4G/LTE.
Indonesia	No Service	Smartfren	2017-11-13	CDMA2000		CDMA2000 1X, 1xEV-DO Rel. 0, 1xEV-DO Rev. A, EV-DO Rev. B
Indonesia	No Service	Telkomsel	2023-06-23	UMTS		
Indonesia	No Service	Indosat	2022-12-31	UMTS		
Indonesia	No Service	XL Axiata	2023-12-31	UMTS		Local shutdowns commenced in Jun 2021.
Ireland	No Service	eir	2026-10-28	UMTS		Local shutdowns commenced in Sep 2026.
Ireland	No Service	3	2024	UMTS		
Ireland	No Service	Vodafone	2024-10-31	UMTS		Local shutdowns commenced in Feb 2023.
Israel			2025-12-31 (est.)			Per government statement
Italy	Active	Iliad	—N/a	UMTS		Service on the 2100 MHz band ended on 07 Aug 2025.
Italy		TIM	2022-10-21	UMTS		
Italy		Vodafone	2021-02-28	UMTS		
Italy	Active	Wind Tre	—N/a	UMTS		Service on the 2100 MHz band ended on 07 Aug 2025. Shutdown commenced on 07 Jun 2024.
Japan	No Service	KDDI	2022-03-31	CDMA2000		CDMA2000 1X, 1xEV-DO Rel. 0, 1xEV-DO Rev. A, EV-DO Rev. B
Japan	No Service	NTT docomo	2026-03-31	UMTS		
Japan	No Service	Softbank	2024-04-15	UMTS		
Kazakhstan		Beeline Kazakhstan	TBD	UMTS		Local shutdown commenced on 10 Feb 2026.
Kazakhstan		Tele2	TBD	UMTS		Local shutdown commenced on 28 Mar 2024.
Latvia	No Service	LMT	2025-03-18	UMTS		
Latvia	No Service	Tele2	2025-03-05	UMTS		
Latvia	No Service	Bitė	2026-03-24	UMTS		Shutdown commenced on 25 Jun 2025.
Lithuania	No Service	Telia	2022-12-15	UMTS		
Lithuania	No Service	Tele2	2025-03-14	UMTS		
Lithuania	No Service	Bitė	2025-12-12	UMTS		
Luxembourg	No Service	Post Luxembourg	2022-10-31	UMTS		
Luxembourg	No Service	Orange	2025-12-31	UMTS		
Luxembourg	No Service	Tango / Proximus	2024-01-31	UMTS		
Macau	No Service	China Telecom	2025-06-04	CDMA2000		CDMA2000 1X, 1xEV-DO Rev. A
Macau	No Service	CTM	2025-06-04	UMTS		
Macau	No Service	3	2025-06-04	UMTS		
Macau	No Service	Smartone	2024-11-11	UMTS		Smartone ceased operations in Macau and returned its license.
Malaysia	No Service	Celcom	2021-12-31	UMTS		
Malaysia	No Service	Maxis	2021-12-31	UMTS		
Malaysia	No Service	U Mobile	2021-12-31	UMTS		
Malaysia	No Service	Digi	2021-12-31	UMTS		
Moldova	No Service	Interdnestrcom	2023-08-01	CDMA2000		
Montenegro	No Service	Crnogorski Telekom	2024-01-22	UMTS		
Netherlands		KPN	2023-05-10	UMTS		Local shutdown commenced on 31 Mar 2022.
Netherlands		Odido	TBD	UMTS		
Netherlands		Vodafone	2020-02-04	UMTS		
New Zealand	No Service	2degrees	2026-02-02	UMTS		
New Zealand	No Service	One	2026-03-23	UMTS		Local shutdown commenced by 31 Mar 2025.
New Zealand	No Service	Spark	2026-03-31	UMTS		Local shutdown on 31 Mar 2026.
North Macedonia	No Service	Makedonski Telekom	2024-03-31	UMTS		
Norway	No Service	Telia	2021-11-11	UMTS		
Norway	No Service	Telenor	2021-01-31	UMTS		
Oman	No Service	Omantel	2025-07-04	UMTS		
Pakistan	No Service	Jazz	2024-11-18	UMTS		
Pakistan	Limited; Service	Ufone	2025-10-01	UMTS		3G shutdown completed in 100+ cities in 2025. 3G remains active in Lahore, Hyderabad, Karachi (partial) and rural areas.
Philippines	No Service	Smart (PLDT)	2025-09-30	UMTS		Shutdown commenced in Oct 2020.
Philippines	No Service	Globe	2022-12-31	UMTS		
Poland		T-Mobile	2023-04	UMTS		Shutdown commenced in Apr 2023.
Poland		Orange	2025-12-31	UMTS		Shutdown commenced on 26 Sep 2023.
Poland		Play	TBD	UMTS		Shutdown commenced in Apr 2025.
Poland		Plus	TBD	UMTS		Shutdown commenced in Dec 2025.
Portugal	No Service	MEO	2024-01-31	UMTS		Shutdown commenced on 4 Sep 2023.
Portugal	No Service	Vodafone	2024-07-31	UMTS		
Portugal	No Service	NOS	2024-05-31	UMTS		Shutdown commenced in May 2024.
Qatar	No Service	Ooredoo	2025-12-31	UMTS		
Qatar	No Service	Vodafone	2025-12-31	UMTS		
Romania	No Service	Digi	2023-08-29	UMTS		
Romania	No Service	Orange	2025-12-31	UMTS		Shutdown commenced in Jun 2024.
Romania	No Service	Telekom	2023-03-31	UMTS		
Romania	No Service	Vodafone	2025-07-01	UMTS		
Russian Federation	Limited; Service	MTS	2027 (est.)	UMTS		Shutdowns completed in Saint-Petersburg in 2024. Shutdowns completed in Moscow and further 203 cities in 2026, and expected country-wide by 2027.
Russian Federation	Active	MegaFon	—N/a	UMTS		
Russian Federation	Active	t2	—N/a	UMTS		
Russian Federation	Limited; Service	Beeline	2028 (est.)	UMTS		Shutdown completed in Moscow and Saint-Petersburg by 2024. Shutdowns completed across further 36 subjects and expected country-wide by 2028.
Saudi Arabia	No Service	stc	2023-09-30	UMTS		
Singapore	No Service	M1	2024-08-01	UMTS		
Singapore	No Service	Singtel	2024-11-01	UMTS		
Singapore	No Service	StarHub	2024-11-01	UMTS		
Slovakia	No Service	O_{2}	2025-12-31	UMTS		Local shutdown commenced in Jan 2024.
Slovakia	No Service	Orange	2024-02-22	UMTS		
Slovakia	No Service	Telekom	2023-11-23	UMTS		Local shutdown commenced on 03 Oct 2023.
Slovenia		A1 Slovenija	2023-06-30	UMTS		
Slovenia		Telekom Slovenije	2022-09-30	UMTS		
Slovenia	Active	Telemach	—N/a	UMTS		
South Africa		MTN	2026-12-31	UMTS		
South Korea		KT	2012-03-19	CDMA2000		CDMA2000 was also referred to as "2G" in South Korea, besides cdmaOne (IS-95). CDMA2000 1X, 1xEV-DO Rel. 0
South Korea	Active	KT	—N/a	UMTS		
South Korea		LG U^{+}	2021-06-30	CDMA2000		CDMA2000 1X, 1xEV-DO Rev. A, EV-DO Rev. B
South Korea		SKT	2020-07-27	CDMA2000		CDMA2000 was also referred to as "2G" in South Korea, besides cdmaOne (IS-95). CDMA2000 1X, 1xEV-DO Rel. 0
South Korea	Active	SKT	—N/a	UMTS		
Spain		Movistar	2025-12-31 (est.)	UMTS		
Spain		Orange	2027-12-31 (est.)	UMTS		
Spain		Vodafone	2024-10-29	UMTS		
Spain		Yoigo	2025-08-18	UMTS		
Sri Lanka	No Service	Airtel	2022-06-12	UMTS		
Sri Lanka	No Service	Dialog Axiata	2023	UMTS		
Sweden	No Service	Net4Mobility (Telenor/Tele2)	2025-12-09	UMTS		
Sweden	No Service	Telia	2025-12-01	UMTS		
Sweden	No Service	Three	2025-12-01	UMTS		
Switzerland		Salt	2026-12-31 (est.)	UMTS		
Switzerland		Sunrise	2025-08-22	UMTS		Official shutdown on 10 Jun 2025 (guaranteed availability).
Switzerland		Swisscom	2026-04-07	UMTS		Service on 2100 MHz band ended on 11 Nov 2019. Official shutdown on 31 Dec 2025 (guaranteed availability).
Taiwan	No Service	Asia Pacific Telecom	2017-12-31	CDMA2000		CDMA2000 1X, 1xEV-DO Rev. A
Taiwan	No Service	Chunghwa Telecom	2018-12-31 (Data); 2024-06-30 (Voice)	UMTS		
Taiwan	No Service	Far EasTone	2018-12-31 (Data); 2024-06-30 (Voice)	UMTS		
Taiwan	No Service	Taiwan Mobile	2018-12-31 (Data); 2024-06-30 (Voice)	UMTS		
Taiwan	No Service	Taiwan Star	2018-12-31 (Data); 2024-06-30 (Voice)	UMTS		
Ukraine	No Service	Kyivstar	2026-09-07	UMTS		Shutdown started in 2023
United Kingdom	No Service	EE	2024-02-25	UMTS		Shutdown commenced on 17 Jul 2023 in Warrington (Cheshire).
United Kingdom	No Service	Three	2025-11-27	UMTS		
United Kingdom	No Service	O2	2026-02-25	UMTS		Shutdown commenced in Apr 2025 and concluded with the Greater London area the last to lose service on 25 Feb 2026.
United Kingdom	No Service	Vodafone	2024-02-28	UMTS		Local shutdown commenced in Jun 2023.
United States; Puerto Rico; US Virgin Islands	No Service	Appalachian Wireless	2023-01-03	CDMA2000		CDMA2000 1X, 1xEV-DO Rev. A
United States; Puerto Rico; US Virgin Islands	No Service	AT&T	2022-02-22	UMTS		
United States; Puerto Rico; US Virgin Islands	No Service	Cellcom	2023-03-31	CDMA2000		
United States; Puerto Rico; US Virgin Islands	No Service	Cellular One of North East Arizona	2023-05-04	UMTS		
United States; Puerto Rico; US Virgin Islands	No Service	Commnet Wireless (Choice)	2022-12-31	CDMA2000		
United States; Puerto Rico; US Virgin Islands	No Service	Liberty	2022-02-22	UMTS		
United States; Puerto Rico; US Virgin Islands	No Service	Silver Star	2022-12-30	CDMA2000		CDMA2000 1X & 1xEV-DO Rev. A
United States; Puerto Rico; US Virgin Islands	No Service	Strata Networks	2022-12-31	CDMA2000		
United States; Puerto Rico; US Virgin Islands	No Service	T-Mobile	2022-07-01	UMTS		
United States; Puerto Rico; US Virgin Islands	No Service	T-Mobile (Sprint)	2022-05-31	CDMA2000		CDMA2000 1X, 1X Adv. (Rev.E), 1xEV-DO Rel. 0, 1xEV-DO Rev. A Shutdown commenced on 31 Mar 2022.
United States; Puerto Rico; US Virgin Islands	No Service	UScellular	2024-01-14	CDMA2000		CDMA2000 1X; 1xEV-DO (Rel. 0 & Rev. A) shutdown commenced in 2021.
United States; Puerto Rico; US Virgin Islands	No Service	Verizon	2022-12-31	CDMA2000		CDMA2000 1X, 1xEV-DO Rel. 0, 1xEV-DO Rev. A
Vietnam			2028-09 (est.)			per government statement

== See also ==
- List of mobile phone generations
- Mobile radio telephone (also known as "0G")
- Mobile broadband
- Wireless device radiation and health
- 1G
- 2G
- 4G
- 5G
- 6G
- LTE (telecommunication)

Preceded by 2nd Generation (2G)	Mobile Telephony Generations	Succeeded by 4th Generation (4G)
