= Corvinus International Investment Ltd. =

Hungarian state-owned asset management company

- Founded: 1997
- Headquarters: 16 Fény street, Budapest, Hungary
- Key people: Andrea Torzsa (CEO)
- Website: https://corvinus.hu/

Corvinus International Investment Ltd. is a Hungarian state-owned asset management company. It is responsible for the execution of transactions related to company holdings in line with the strategic objectives of economic development and for the preservation and growth of the assets owned by the company.

The ownership of the company is exercised by the Ministry for National Economy.

== Notable transactions ==
=== MBH Bank ===
In 2015, the Hungarian Government acquired a 100 percent stake of Budapest Bank through Corvinus Ltd.

In 2020, MKB Bank, Budapest Bank and MTB (Takarékbank) became part of the Hungarian Bankholding Ltd. Through the transaction, Corvinus Ltd. gained a 30.35 percent stake in the banking group.

In December 2024, MBH Bank purchased 7 percent worth of own shares from private investors and Corvinus BHG Ltd., a wholly owned subsidiary of Corvinus Ltd., reducing the state’s stake to 20.01 percent.

=== Erste Bank Hungary ===
In June 2016, the Hungarian state, represented by Corvinus Ltd., acquired a 15 percent stake in Erste Bank Hungary Zrt. The Hungarian state paid HUF 38.9 billion for the stake.

The stake was sold by Corvinus Zrt. to the Austrian parent company Erste Bank AG at the end of 2023 for HUF 87.5 billion.

=== Hungarian VIG companies ===
In March 2022, the Austrian Vienna Insurance Group (VIG) sold its 45 percent stake in two of its Hungarian insurers - Aegon and UNION Biztosító - to Corvinus Ltd.

In November 2023, VIG repurchased a block of shares representing a 35 percent stake, reducing the Hungarian state's stake to 10 percent.

=== Posta Biztosító ===
In April 2023, Corvinus Ltd. acquired 66.9% stake in Hungarian Post Life Insurance Plc. and Hungarian Post Insurance Plc. from Talanx AG.

In July 2024, Granit Biztosító, a subsidiary of the Waberer's Group, announced that the company has signed an agreement with Corvinus Ltd. for the acquisition of the stake. he transaction closed in November 2024.

=== Yettel Hungary ===
In March 2023, Corvinus Ltd. and Antenna Hungária entered into a share swap transaction, under which Antenna Hungária exchanged its 25 percent stake in the Hungarian subsidiaries of PPF Telecom Group for 19.5 percent of the Vodafone shares held by Corvinus Ltd.

The state sold its stake in Yettel Hungary in December 2023 to the Dutch holding company TMT Hungary Holdco B.V., a member of the PPF Group.

=== Vodafone Hungary ===
On 31 January 2023, Corvinus Ltd. and Antenna Hungária Ltd. acquired Vodafone Hungary from Vodafone Europe BV in a transaction worth HUF 660 billion, with the companies owning 51% and 49% of the shares, respectively.

In March 2023, following the stock swap transaction between Antenna Hungária and Corvinus Ltd. in relation to Yettel Hungary, Antenna Hungária held a 70.5% stake and Corvinus held 29.5% in Vodafone Hungary.

In May 2025, as part of a multi-stage transaction, Corvinus Ltd. acquired a 37.9 percent direct stake and 4iG Plc. acquired a 62.1 percent direct stake in 4iG Telecommunications Holding (rebranded from Antenna Hungária), which became the sole owner of One Hungary (rebranded from Vodafone Hungary on 1 January 2025) and V-Hálózat (the separated infrastructure company of One Hungary).

=== Budapest Airport ===
On June 6, 2024, the government of Hungary announced that Corvinus Ltd. and Vinci Airports have purchased Budapest Airport, the operator of Budapest Liszt Ferenc International Airport, from its previous owners. Corvinus Ltd. and Vinci, after paying EUR 3.1 billion in cash and assuming a net debt of EUR 1.2 billion, now hold 80% and 20% ownership of the capital's airport, respectively.
