= Yettel =

Yettel is a brand of telecommunications operators operating in several countries, of the PPF Group, which has acquired them from Telenor in 2018. Since 2024, they are owned by e& PPF Telecom Group (formed from PPF Group partnership with e&).

These are:

- Yettel Bulgaria (formerly Telenor and Globul), Bulgarian telecommunications company
- Yettel Hungary (formerly Telenor, Pannon and Pannon GSM), Hungarian telecommunications company
- Yettel Serbia (formerly Mobtel, Mobi 63 and Telenor), Serbian telecommunications company
