= Wap3 =

Software company

wap3 Technologies GmbH is a company with its headquarters in Cologne, Germany. It provides wireless applications to operators and consumers. wap3 is a publisher of mobile consumer services and its applications regularly rank among the top-5 in mobile portals.

To date, wap3 services are available to over 240 million mobile users in 31 countries, running more than 80 commercial implementations in 10 different languages. Wap3 describes itself as a "partners of choice" for wireless applications in many major mobile portals.

wap3 has partnerships Wind, Telefónica, O2, Kpn, Telecom Italia, Telering, One, Orange, E-plus, Movistar, MTS, UMC, Telenor Montenegro, Bouygues

== History ==
wap3 began in 1999 with co-founders Dr. Leif Singer and Andreas Diehl. The company was formally established in May 2000.

On 6/6/2006, Australian Technology company Jumbuck Entertainment Ltd (ASX: JMB) announced that it had completed the acquisition of wap3's community business. Jumbuck acquired a 100% interest in wap3's community business, research and development facility and related investments from wap3 technologies for a purchase price of €4.6 million (approximately A$7.7million). wap3's principals committed to two year management contracts with Jumbuck.

== Partnerships ==
Köln International School of Design 2005
