= One Hungary =

Hungarian telecommunications provider

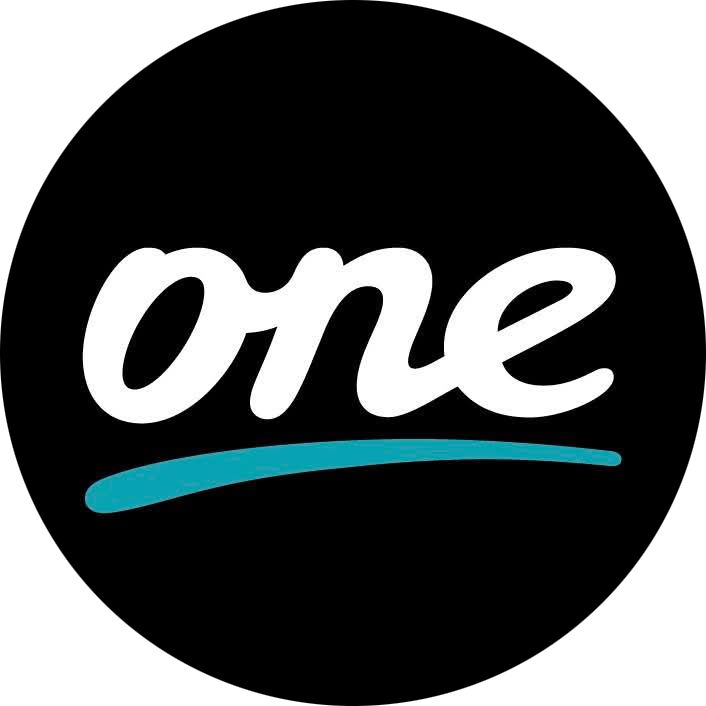
- Formerly: Vodafone Hungary (1999–2024)
- Company type: Subsidiary of 4iG
- Industry: Telecommunications
- Founded: 1999; 27 years ago
- Headquarters: Budapest, Hungary
- Key people: Tamás Bányai, CEO
- Products: Mobile phone and broadband services, Broadband internet, Digital television, Integrated IT services
- Parent: 4iG (100%)
- Website: www.one.hu

One Hungary (formerly Vodafone Hungary until 1 January 2025) is a Hungarian telecommunications service provider. It started operations in 1999 as a mobile network operator after securing the third GSM 900/1800 MHz licence of the country and it was the first provider operating in the DCS-1800 band in Hungary.

One is the second largest mobile network operator of the country. The operator had a share of ~27% of the market in Q2 2020. They controlled approx. 29% of the market in 2024 Q2. The full report about the number of subscribers is available on the company website.

== Network information ==
The MCC-MNC of One (formerly Vodafone Hungary) is 216-70 and area code is 70 (international: +36 70)

The display name of Vodafone Hungary was: vodafone HU

The display name of One Hungary: One HU

One (formerly Vodafone) operates a GSM, GPRS, EDGE network on 900/1800 MHz, formerly a HSDPA+ network on 900/2100 MHz and actually an LTE on (800/1800/2600 MHz) and also an LTE-A on (1800/2600 MHz) The company has more than 2600 active Base Transceiver Stations (BTS), and thanks to the modernisation in 2011, the whole network is capable of LTE transmission. The GSM network was available in 98.6% while the 3G network covered 90.1% of Hungary in May 2012.

== Services ==
=== Telephone ===
Landline telephone service with additional packages: traditional landline telephone service.

Mobile service: One's own mobile radio telephone service.

=== Internet ===
Cable network (FTTB): "Fiber to the Building", i.e. the signal arrives in the building via optical fiber, from which an unlimited broadband Internet connection is provided via UTP cable.

Internet provided via an optical network (FTTH): Internet service provided via a fiber optic cable, which enables particularly fast data transmission.

Mobile internet: internet connection provided wirelessly via a mobile network.

=== One TV ===
IPTV: an interactive TV service provided through the internet, which can be received on traditional TV sets, many channels are also available in HD quality.

Cable TV: analog or digital television service available on a cable network, which also allows the broadcasting of high-definition, HD-quality broadcasts.

Satellite TV: Satellite television is a broadcasting system that transmits television signals to Earth via satellites and is received using a satellite dish.

Terrestrial TV: Terrestrial television is a broadcasting system that transmits TV broadcasts directly to households through antennas, without the need for a cable or satellite connection.

== History ==
On 7 July 1999 a consortium formed by V.R.A.M. and Primatel won the third GSM 900/1800 licence in Hungary. After signing the agreement on 30 November 1999, the consortium launched its network under the Vodafone brand. In the initial years, Vodafone used towers of its main competitors Westel (now Telekom) and Pannon GSM (now Yettel) networks, while their own network was available only in Budapest and other main cities. At the end of 2002, they covered 90% of the country.

On 30 January 2003 the company launched the Vodafone live! service and in the same year, the customer base of Vodafone reached over 1 million.

In December 2004, Vodafone purchased the third 3G licence under the 2004 UMTS tender of NHH.

In 2005, Vodafone launched the Vodafone Passport service, available in 17 countries at the time. On 16 December 2005 they launched the third 3G network of the country, which was available only in the inner districts of Budapest.

In November 2006, the company offered a new alternative for fixed line telephone users. The Vodafone Otthon service allows customers to combine the advantages of landline and mobile telecommunications with one single handset.

In 2008, Vodafone switched to Huawei as a supplier of their UMTS infrastructure. In the same year, the company offered free in-network texts or minutes for all pre-paid customers, provided they charged their balance with 3000 HUF or more.

Vodafone Hungary, along with Magyar Posta and Line 21 launched the first MVNO operating under the Postafon brand in Hungary in 2009. The operator was also testing LTE technology in Budapest around this time. Vodafone introduced the Vodafone Plus postpaid plan as well, which offered unlimited voice and text services as a first on the Hungarian market.

In 2011, Vodafone announced the modernisation of their network infrastructure.

In 2012, Vodafone announced a 50% joint venture with Tesco to launch Tesco Mobile. This partnership was the first official collaboration between the two companies in the world. In December that year, Vodafone launched 3G services on lines M2 and M3 of the Budapest Metro.

In 2018, Vodafone announced the acquisition of UPC Hungary. The acquisition closed in August 2019. In April 2020, the UPC brand was completely phased out, with all services rebranded to Vodafone Hungary.

The network modernisation process completed in March 2012. Vodafone, after securing additional bandwidth in the E-GSM band, launched the nationwide HSDPA+ network, which is available for roughly 9.5 million people in the country. As of July 2012, the 21 Mbit/s capable HSDPA+ network is available in 2432 settlements while the 42 Mbit/s capable DC-HSPA+ network in 101 settlements, including Budapest. The whole network is capable of LTE. Vodafone launched their RED plans aimed at smartphone users with unlimited calls and texts in October 2012. They were the first operator offering flat-rate tariffs on the market.

On 31 January 2023, Antenna Hungária (a subsidiary of 4iG) and Corvinus Nemzetközi Befektetési Zrt. (an investment company owned by the Hungarian State) acquired Vodafone Hungary, with the companies owning 51% and 49% of the shares, respectively.

On 1 January 2025 the company changed its name due to the new owners to One.

=== UPC Hungary ===
UPC Hungary's first logo from 1997 to 2007

UPC Magyarország (English: UPC Hungary) was Liberty Global Europe's telecommunications operation in Hungary. UPC Magyarország is the largest cable television operator in Hungary. UPC Hungary provides digital and analog cable video, broadband internet, and traditional circuit-switched and digital telephony (VoIP) services to 2.0 million service subscribers as of 31 December 2014.

UPC Hungary operated in 22 major Hungarian cities and towns and in their surrounding areas, including Budapest, the capital city, Debrecen, Miskolc, Pécs, and Székesfehérvár. In 2017, revenue was $310.2 million

In May 2018, Vodafone announced that it would acquire the company. The company merged with Vodafone Hungary and the UPC brand was retired in April 2020.

== Sponsorship ==
In October 2007, Vodafone signed a sponsorship contract with the Hungarian Water Polo Association and Tamás Kásás. Vodafone Hungary became the main sponsor of the Association when the sponsorship deal was extended by another four years in 2009.

The Vodafone Group was the main sponsor of the previously named McLaren Mercedes Formula One team in 2013. Vodafone opened the first Vodafone McLaren Mercedes store of Europe in Budapest in 2010. In that year, Vodafone also made it possible for the logo of Pick Szeged to be displayed during the 2010 Hungarian Grand Prix on the McLaren Formula 1 cars. On May 1, 2012, Vodafone brought Formula One to the streets of Budapest. Jenson Button showed what it is like to drive at 172 Mph on a downtown avenue as a part of Vodafone Hungary's 'Raise your game' weekend.

From 2010 to 2011 Vodafone Hungary was the main sponsor of Sziget Festival.

From 2021 to 2022 Vodafone was the main sponsor of UEFA Europa Conference League.

== Criticism ==
In July 2002, Vodafone announced a flat-rate GPRS internet offer, which provided unlimited Internet access for their customers. In 2003, Vodafone changed the terms and conditions of the service and introduced traffic restrictions, which caused many customer to complain to the regulators.

In 2007, the company announced a new flat-rate unlimited internet service on the HSDPA network. The terms and conditions changed later, and Vodafone introduced bandwidth restrictions above 5 GB/month traffic. GVH, the competition regulator in Hungary fined the company.

In 2010, GVH fined Vodafone and T-Mobile. Both companies claimed to have 'the fastest mobile data network' in the country without reasonable proof.

== OneTV ==
OneTV is a modern television platform launched in autumn 2024 that integrates linear channels, on-demand content and streaming services on a single interface. The purpose of the platform is to merge access to traditional TV channels, with the ability to watch previously broadcast programs and popular streaming services.

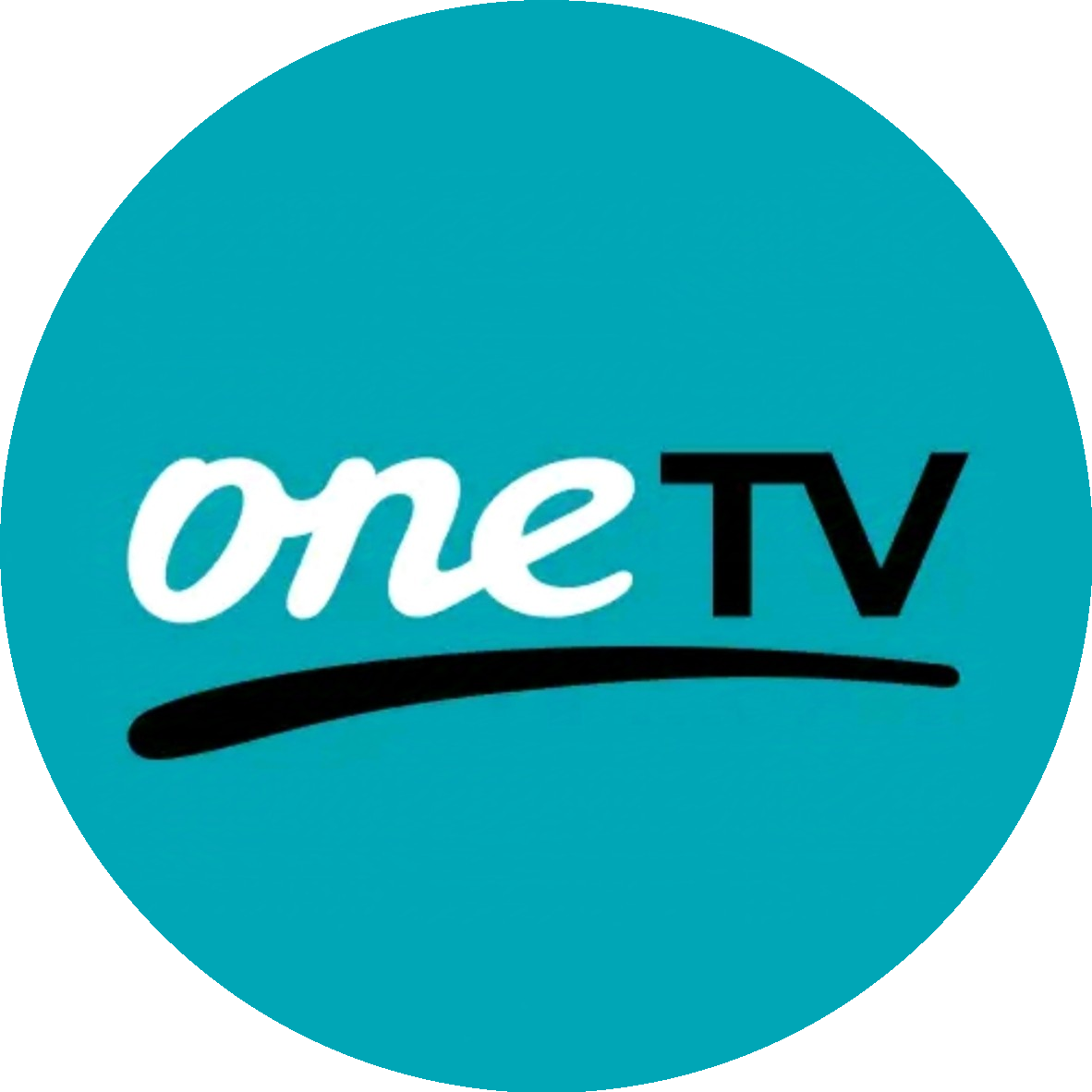
OneTV logo

OneTV allows users to subscribe to services such as YouTube, Netflix, Spotify, Disney+ and Max.

The platform is available on a variety of devices, including smartphones, tablets and smart TVs, ensuring flexible and convenient access anywhere and anytime. A mobile app is available on Google Play and the App Store.

The platform is constantly expanding its offer and functions to keep up with user needs and technological development.
