= Yettel Bank =

Commercial bank in Serbia

- Type: Joint-stock company
- Industry: Financial services
- Founded: 9 May 2014; 12 years ago
- Headquarters: Omladinskih brigada 88, Belgrade, Serbia
- Area served: Serbia
- Key people: Aleksandar Bogdanović (CEO)
- Products: Commercial banking
- Revenue: ▲€7.11 million (2018)
- Total assets: ▲€134.786 million (2018)
- Owner: PPF (100%)
- Number of employees: >500 (May 2024)
- Website: yettelbank.rs

Yettel Bank a.d. Beograd (Serbian: Јетел банка а.д. Београд, romanized: Jetel banka a.d. Beograd), is a commercial bank in Serbia. Originally established in 1996 as Alco banka, it was acquired by KBC Group in 2007 and subsequently rebranded as KBC banka. In 2014, KBC banka was acquired by Telenor, one of the country's largest telecommunications operators, and renamed Telenor Banka. It was renamed Mobi Banka in 2019 and adopted its current name after Telenor sold its Serbian operations to Yettel.

== History ==
The banking licence was originally awarded to "Alco Banka" in 1996, and was in ownership of Serbian businessman Miroljub Aleksić. The bank later changed its name to "A Banka".

In 2007, "A Bank" was sold to the Belgian KBC banka for 100 million euros. After the transaction, it changed name to "KBC Bank Serbia". The Belgian bank was present in Serbia from 2007 up until 2014, when they announced their retreat from the Serbian market. They made a deal with Société Générale Srbija to sell its portfolio to this bank, while the banking licence and the bank itself were sold to Telenor Group, which was already present in Serbia, as a telecommunications operator. Thus, Telenor banka was founded, and commenced its operations in September 2014.

In 2017, a strategic partnership contract was signed between Telenor and the Bulgarian investment fund River Styxx, selling 85% of shares to River Styxx. Telenor would keep a 15% share in bank's ownership, retaining special ties between Telenor Serbia and the bank. However, the transaction was annulled by the National Bank of Serbia in February 2018, due to "non-fulfillment of the prescribed conditions established by the regulations of Serbia".

In 2018, PPF Group announced it acquire 100% of the shares in Telenor Banka from Telenor Group. The acquisition was completed in 2019 and later that year Telenor banka changed its name to Mobi Banka.

In 2024, Mobi Banka changed its name to Yettel Bank following the rebrand of Telenor Serbia to Yettel Serbia that was completed in 2022, thus combining the telecommunications and banking under the unique "Yettel" brand. With the rebrand, PPF Group announced it will provide an additional capital of 33 million euros within a five-year investment, with a part of it already being invested in the application and IT infrastructure. Yettel Bank also announced an additional team enlargement, especially in the product and IT departments.

== See also ==
- List of banks in Serbia
