= E& PPF Telecom Group =

Telecommunications provider

etisalat PPF Telecom Group
- Type: Private
- Industry: Telecommunications
- Founded: 16 October 2013; 13 years ago
- Headquarters: Amsterdam, Netherlands
- Area served: Bulgaria; Hungary; Serbia; Slovakia
- Key people: Balesh Sharma (CEO)
- Products: Mobile telephony; Broadband; fixed-line telephony; IPTV; telecommunications infrastructure
- Revenue: €2.413 billion (2025)
- Net income: €382 million (2025)
- Owner: e& (50% + 1 share); PPF Group (50% − 1 share)
- Number of employees: 9,100 (2025)
- Website: www.eandppftelecom.eu

etisalat PPF Telecom Group B.V. is a telecommunications holding company headquartered in Amsterdam, Netherlands, with operations in Bulgaria, Hungary, Serbia and Slovakia. It is controlled by Emirati telecommunications group etisalat, which owns 50% plus one share, while PPF Group owns the rest. The group provides telecommunications services through Yettel in Bulgaria, Hungary and Serbia and through O2 in Slovakia, while its telecommunications infrastructure businesses operate under the CETIN brand.

The company was incorporated in 2013 was named PPF Telecom Group B.V. since 2020. It assumed its current ownership structure and name in October 2024, when e& acquired a controlling stake in PPF's telecommunications businesses in Bulgaria, Hungary, Serbia and Slovakia. PPF's Czech telecommunications businesses, including O2 Czech Republic and CETIN Czechia, were excluded from the transaction and remained with PPF.

== History ==
=== PPF Telecom Group ===
PPF Telecom Group was formed after PPF Group acquired Telenor's telecommunications businesses in Bulgaria, Hungary, Montenegro and Serbia in 2018. The acquisition expanded PPF's existing telecommunications operations in the Czech Republic and Slovakia into a regional group. In 2021, the group sold its Montenegrin business to Hungarian telecommunications company 4iG.

=== Acquisition by e& ===
In August 2023, PPF agreed to sell 50% plus one share of the group's businesses in Bulgaria, Hungary, Serbia and Slovakia to Emirati telecommunications group e& for an initial consideration of €2.15 billion. PPF's Czech telecommunications businesses, including O2 Czech Republic and CETIN Czechia, were excluded from the transaction.

The European Commission opened an in-depth investigation into the acquisition in June 2024 under the EU Foreign Subsidies Regulation. It found that subsidies received by e& had not distorted the acquisition process, but could distort competition after the transaction. The Commission approved the acquisition in September 2024 subject to commitments concerning state guarantees and financing.

The transaction was completed on 24 October 2024. e& became the controlling shareholder with 50% plus one share, while PPF retained 50% minus one share. The group was renamed e& PPF Telecom Group.

In November 2026, after the rebranding of e& to etisalat, the group was renamed etisalat PPF Telecom Group.

=== Expansion ===
The group subsequently expanded its fixed-broadband operations. In April 2025, it acquired Serbian broadband and television provider SBB from United Group for €825 million. SBB was merged into Yettel Serbia in April 2026.

Later that month, O2 Slovakia acquired UPC Broadband Slovakia, further expanding the group's fixed-broadband and television business in Slovakia.

== Operations ==
etisalat PPF Telecom Group operates in Bulgaria, Hungary, Serbia and Slovakia. They provide mobile and fixed broadband services, television and business connectivity.

The group's network infrastructure businesses operate under the CETIN brand and provide wholesale telecommunications services.

Country	Retail operator	Network infrastructure
Bulgaria	Yettel Bulgaria	CETIN Bulgaria
Hungary	Yettel Hungary	CETIN Hungary
Serbia	Yettel Serbia	CETIN Serbia
Slovakia	O2 Slovakia	CETIN Networks
