= One Montenegro =

Montenegrin mobile phone operator

- Native name: One Crna Gora
- Formerly: ProMonte (1996–2010); Telenor Montenegro (2010–2022)
- Company type: Subsidiary
- Industry: Telecommunications
- Founded: March 1996; 30 years ago
- Headquarters: Podgorica, Montenegro
- Key people: Branko Mitrović (CEO)
- Services: Mobile telephony
- Owner: Antenna Hungária
- Parent: 4iG
- Website: 1.me

One Montenegro (full legal name: One Crna Gora DOO) is a mobile phone operator in Montenegro.

== History ==
In November 1995, PTT of Montenegro and European Telecom Luxembourg signed a contract on establishing a limited liability company in the aim of obtaining a mobile telephony license in Montenegro. Then in January 1996, consortium ETL and PTT of Montenegro obtained a 20-year concession for establishing a GSM 900 mobile network in Montenegro. Then ProMonte was founded two months later, in March 1996. ProMonte went live on July 10, 1996. The first mobile telephony call made in Montenegro was on July 10, 1996. In December 2001, ProMonte obtained a 15-year license, letting it use GSM 900 and DCS 1800. At the same time, PTT of Montenegro sold ETL its 9% of ProMonte shares. On August 11, 2004, Telenor has completed the acquisition of an additional 55.9% of the shares in ProMonte, and became the 100% owner of ProMonte. ProMonte was rebranded as Telenor on May 18, 2010.

In January 2018, the company's management confirmed media reports that there is interest in sale of Telenor's business in Southeast Europe, including Telenor Montenegro. In March 2018, Telenor sold its business in Southeast Europe (Bulgaria, Hungary, Montenegro and Serbia) to the investment fund PPF, for a sum of 2.8 billion euros.

As of December 2021. Telenor in Montenegro is part of 4iG. After the purchase, 4iG transferred the ownership to Antenna Hungária. The company has more than 1,900 employees.

On March 1, 2022, the company announced that the Telenor brand in Montenegro completely changes to ‘ONE’ with the rebrand happening on March 14. The new brand represents friendliness, commitment, agility and transparency.
