= Tele2, UAB =

Telecommunications company

- Headquarters in Vilnius
- Industry: Telecommunications
- Founded: 1993
- Headquarters: Vilnius, Lithuania
- Products: mobile communications, internet services
- Revenue: €347.570 million (2023)
- Operating income: €120.577 million (2023)
- Net income: €104.875 million (2023)
- Parent: Tele2
- Website: tele2.lt

Tele2, UAB is a telecommunications company registered in Lithuania and owned by the Swedish company Tele2. It was founded in 1993. The main office of the company is located in Vilnius.

Tele2 operates in the field of mobile and fixed communications, it is an Internet service provider, television operator, retailer. It offers prepaid service Pildyk. Tele2 is the largest mobile communications operator in Lithuania by turnover and number of customers (there are more than 1.8 million subscribers).

== History ==
On December 29, 1993, the Estonian company Levicom founded a subsidiary UAB Levi&Kuto in Lithuania. It was engaged in the sale of communication equipment, including mobile phones. On September 23, 1998, Levi&Kuto obtained a DCS 1800 (GSM-1800) license in Lithuania.[2] In 1999, UAB Levi&Kuto was acquired by the Swedish telecommunications services group NetCom (since 2001 Tele2 AB). In mid-December of the same year, the third mobile communications network in Lithuania, TELE2, was launched (albeit only on GSM-1800 frequencies).

In January 2000, UAB Levi&Kuto was renamed UAB TELE2. 2000 On May 23, TELE2 introduced its first commercial service (prepaid card) called X-GSM; later it was renamed Pildyk. At the end of 2000, the operator obtained a GSM-900 license, and in 2001 it was able to offer a full spectrum of GSM services. 2003 On July 4, TELE2 became the second largest mobile operator in Lithuania, surpassing operator Bitė. 2004 February 23, the company started to provide fixed telephone communications. 2006 On December 10, TELE2 started providing 3G mobile communication services. In 2009, the operator started offering audio and video broadcasting services on mobile phones.

In March 2013, TELE2 started providing LTE (4th generation) mobile communication services. 2017 On December 6, UAB Tele2, Telia Lietuva and Bitė Lietuva purchased the capital shares of UAB Mobilieji Mokėjimai (33.3% each). Mobilieji Mokėjimai had created the first mobile payment platform in the Baltic States, MoQ.
