= Makedonski Telekom =

Telecommunications company in North Macedonia

Makedonski Telekom AD
- Type: Subsidiary
- Industry: Communications Services
- Founded: 1997 (as Mobimak)
- Headquarters: Skopje, North Macedonia
- Area served: North Macedonia
- Key people: Nikola Ljušev (CEO and Executive member of Board of Directors); Slavko Projkoski (Chief Financial Officer); Branko Stančev (Chief Commercial Officer); Miroslav Jovanović (Chief Technical and IT Officer) Zoran Kitanovski (President of Board of Directors)
- Products: Fixed-line and mobile telephony, broadband and fixed-line internet services, IT and network services, IPTV
- Number of employees: 1,300 (September 2017)
- Parent: Magyar Telekom (51%)
- Website: www.telekom.mk

Makedonski Telekom AD (Macedonian: Македонски Телеком АД, lit. 'Macedonian Telekom PLC') is a telecommunications company in North Macedonia with headquarters in Skopje. It is part of the Magyar Telekom Group, which is a fully consolidated subsidiary of international Deutsche Telekom Group. It offers a range of telecommunications and entertainment services, such as telephone services, a range of internet access services including broadband internet, entertainment IPTV products and operates the national telephone network.

Makedonski Telekom has been present both on the top-most successful companies list and on the top-largest companies list, and has been ranked among the top 10 companies in North Macedonia.

== History ==
=== Formation of Makedonski Telekomunikacii ===
AD Makedonski Telekomunikacii was introduced on 1 January 1997 as a state-owned company independent of the Post Office. The predecessor of the Company which provided telecommunication, postal, banking and other services in the Republic of Macedonia (now North Macedonia) under the name PTT Makedonija was divided into two legal entities: AD Makedonski Telekomunikacii and AD Makedonski Posti. This resulted in the separation of postal operations from those of telecommunications and telegraphy, as well as in the separation of the relevant assets and liabilities. In March 1998, the company was registered as a Joint Stock Company in public ownership in order to prepare for privatization.

=== Privatization ===
The privatization took place on 15 January 2001, when the Government of the Republic of Macedonia and a consortium led by the Hungarian telecommunications provider, Matav, signed a contract for the acquisition of Makedonski Telekomunikacii shares whereby Matav entered Makedonski Telekomunikacii shareholders register as the owner of 51% of the shares and thus became the dominant owner of the company. Since October 2008, the government still holds a stake in company stock directly.

On 1 June 2001, a mobile phone provider T-Mobile Macedonia (formerly Mobimak) began functioning as a separate legal entity (daughter company).

=== Re-branding ===
On May 1, 2008, AD Makedonski Telekomunikacii officially became part of the Deutsche Telekom global family, accepting the new "T" brand. From this date onwards the company runs as a legal subject under the name Makedonski Telekom, Joint Stock Company for Electronic Communications – Skopje or under the abbreviated name, Makedonski Telekom AD – Skopje. With the implementation of the "T" brand, which was umbrella of the two now terminated sub-brands T-Home and T-Mobile, Makedonski Telekom took over Deutsche Telekom Group’s corporate identity and design, launching on the market a series of new products and services, among which the attractive Double Play and Triple Play offers.

=== Consolidation and termination of T-Mobile and T-Home (July–September 2015) ===
Makedonski Telekom and T-Mobile Macedonia as of 1 July officially became one company. The Resolution was adopted on the Shareholders’ Assembly held on 17 June by accepting the Accession Agreement. As of 1 July, T-Mobile Macedonia ceased to exist as a legal entity, whereas all employees, and the total assets and liabilities were taken over by Makedonski Telekom. On 3 September 2015 Makedonski Telekom announced that the company will terminate the two product brands T-Home and T-Mobile and introduce one brand - Telekom, under whose umbrella, the company will continue to offer its whole service portfolio intended for consumer and business customers.

== Lines of business ==
Makedonski Telekom is the dominant fixed and mobile line operator in the market of North Macedonia; it also operates as an Internet service provider, and as integrated telecommunications and entertainment services provider. Offering communication services and entertainment contents ensuring its future revenues, the company is also improving the competitiveness in North Macedonia, as well as growth in mobile and broadband services on national level.

=== Mobile line operator ===
The company has been active in the mobile telephone business since September 1996, when it was introduced as MobiMak when it was the first GSM mobile operator in the Republic of Macedonia. It was bought by Deutsche Telekom and in 2006 changed its name to Т-Mobile. In 2015 it changed its name to Makedonski Telekom, synchronising itself with other Deutsche Telekom group members.

The network covers 99.9% of the population and over 98.5% of the territory of North Macedonia.

Telekom was the first telecommunications company in the country to introduce 4G LTE, GPRS, EDGE and various converged internet and mobile services.

Prefixes that Makedonski Telekom use are: 070 (+389 70); 071 (+389 71); 072 (+389 72).

On March 28, 2024, Makedonski Telekom announced through their social networks that by the end of April 2024, the 3G network will be shut down in order to use the potential for better connectivity, higher speeds, better quality service for users, and better energy efficiency.

=== Fixed line operator ===
The company provides fixed line services through VoIP and has various plans.

All analog fixed equipment was shut down and transferred to ADSL-based VoIP, making North Macedonia among the first countries to transfer to a completely digital fixed phone system. Taking into consideration that fixed phones are going mostly unnoticed and unused, this allowed Telekom to reduce its maintenance costs for the old analog technology, and provide cheaper and calls through the old medium (most notably unlimited nationwide calls through most of their 2 play and 3 play offers, and some free international call allowances at the highest tiers)

=== Internet provider ===
Telekom offers a portfolio of Internet protocol-based services, data communications services, equipment sale and lease, and systems integration services. Makedonski Telekom endeavours to modernize its network and reach a high technological level. Modernization of the network infrastructure with the implementation of optical cables up to the end users, known as fiber-to-the-home (FTTH) is one of the main focuses. By the end of 2012, 88.068 FTTH homes passed, and 12.333 were connected to optic in several major cities such as Skopje, Kumanovo, Stip, Strumica, Ohrid, Gostivar. In November 2011, Makedonski Telekom started a project for modernization of the network through a new fully internet-based multimedia platform of the new generation. The IMS Platform is used for the provision of VoIP as part of the 2Play and 3Play services and as a base for the PSTN network migration towards the all-IP network. In less than nine months, as of November 2011 until June 2012, 100,000 Telekom users already used the new platform, i.e. were migrated on it. This platform replaces the existing digital telephone exchanges and is a preparation for the services of the new generation and the unlimited communication possibilities offered by the internet. In February 2014 Deutsche Telekom revealed that its subsidiary Makedonski Telekom had become the first European incumbent to convert its PSTN infrastructure to an all IP network. It took just over two years for all 290,000 fixed lines to be migrated onto the new platform. The capital investment worth 14 million euros makes North Macedonia the first country in the South-East Europe whose network will be fully based on Internet protocol.

=== IP television ===
Telekom IPTV was launched in November 2008 branded as MaxTV as the first digital TV offer for customers in the Republic of Macedonia. MaxTV offers +150 (HD/SD) TV channels and interactive services via the IPTV platform. MaxTV is used by near 100,000 households.

== Wiretapping scandal and aftermath ==
A large-scale wiretapping scandal shaked the Republic of Macedonia in 2015. High politicians and employees of the Security and Counterespionage Agency were charged with abusing their position. Macedonian Special Prosecution declared that Makedonski Telekom failed to cooperate with the investigation. In the aftermath Deutsche Telekom ordered Magyar Telekom to conduct an internal investigation. The internal investigation's findings were not made public.

== See also ==
- Deutsche Telekom
- Magyar Telekom
