= Yettel Serbia =

Serbian telecommunications company

- Native name: Yettel
- Type: d.o.o.
- Industry: Telecommunication
- Predecessor: 063 Mobtel Srbija (1994–2006); Telenor Srbija (2006–2022); Serbia Broadband
- Founded: 1994; 32 years ago (as 063 Mobtel); 1 March 2022; 4 years ago (as Yettel); 1 April 2026; 5 months ago (current incorporated entity)
- Headquarters: Omladinskih brigada 90, Belgrade, Serbia
- Area served: Serbia
- Key people: Marek Slačik (Director); Marian Mike Michel (Director); Lukáš Kubesa (Director)
- Products: UMTS, HSDPA, W-CDMA, EDGE, GPRS, GSM
- Revenue: ▲€508.30 million (2023)
- Net income: ▲€77.07 million (2023)
- Total assets: ▲€391.46 million (2023)
- Total equity: ▲€297.93 million (2023)
- Owner: e& (50%); PPF (50%)
- Number of employees: 1,848 (2023)
- Parent: e& PPF Telecom Group
- Website: www.yettel.rs
- Footnotes; Business ID: 20147229; Tax ID: 104318304

Yettel Serbia (known as Telenor Serbia until 2022) is a Serbian mobile, fixed, internet and IPTV provider headquartered in Belgrade. The modern Yettel Serbia entity was formed on 1 April 2026, at which time it was part of e& PPF Telecom Group.

As of 2020, it is the second largest mobile telephony operator with market share of 36.98%.

== History ==
=== 1994–2006: 063 Mobtel Srbija ===
063 Mobtel Srbija logo (1994–2005)

Originally launched in 1994 as Mobtel Srbija ("Mobtel Serbia"; full name: Mobilne telekomunikacije Srbija, "Mobile telecommunications Serbia"), the company's operation was a joint venture founded in 1994 between Moscow-based BK Trade (owned by Bogoljub Karić) and government-owned PTT.

The first NMT network was announced in December 1995. The signal covered major urban areas and highway routes – 60% of Serbia's inhabited territory and 12% of Serbia's land area (Serbia was then a constituent republic within the Federal Republic of Yugoslavia). This service is not commercial anymore. The MSISDN Network Code was 061 (international: +381 61); this code is now appointed to A1 Srbija. The GSM network has been in use since 1996.

In 2005, BK Trade sold its shares to a consortium of Austrian investors (through Holdenhurst Holding headed by Martin Schlaff) and the company was renamed Mobi 63.

=== 2006–2021: Telenor Serbia ===
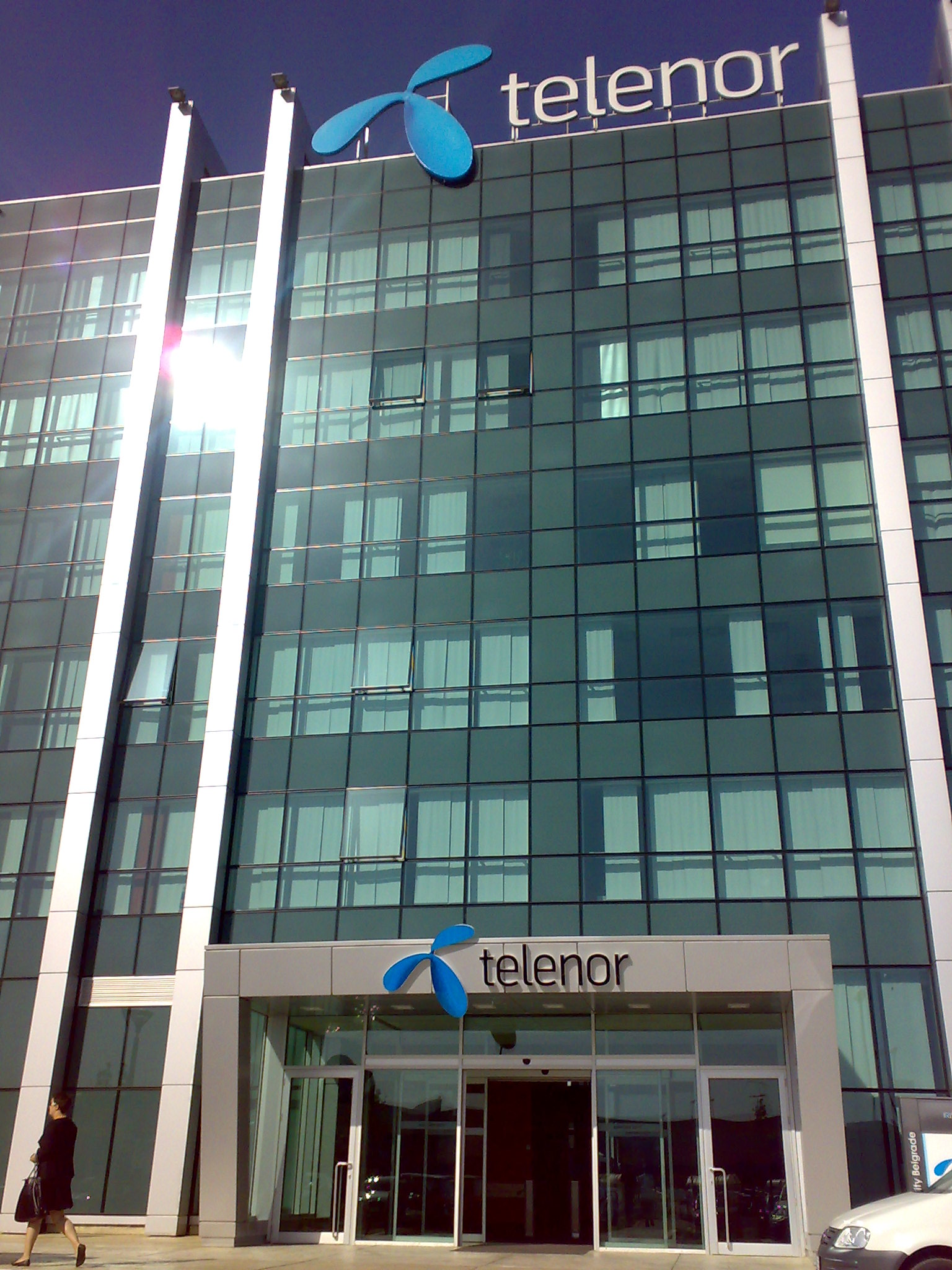
Company's Headquarters in New Belgrade

In 2006, a majority stake in Mobi 63 was sold (70% owned by the Government of Serbia) to the Norwegian Telenor for a sum of 1.513 billion euros. The condition for the acquisition of the remaining 30% of shares, was a bid higher than 1.1 billion euros. The Norwegian company outbid such industry heavyweights as TeliaSonera, France Télécom, Deutsche Telekom, Mobilkom Austria, Orascom Telecom and Tele2. On 31 August 2006, Mobi 63 officially became the property of Telenor and changed its name to Telenor d.o.o.

In January 2010, Telenor Serbia acquired a landline operating licence ending the monopoly held by Telekom Srbija.

On 26 April 2013, Telenor Serbia bought 100% of shares of the Serbian "KBC bank", establishing Telenor banka. With that transaction, 81,000 clients of the former bank were taken by Société Générale Srbija. Since 10 September 2014, Telenor banka operates on the Serbian banking market. In August 2017, Bulgarian investment fund River Styxx Capital has reached an agreement with Serbia's Telenor Banka to acquire 85 percent of its shares, while Telenor will maintain the remaining 15 percent.

=== 2018–present: PPF takeover and rebranding as Yettel ===
In January 2018, the company's management confirmed media reports that there is interest in sale of Telenor's business in Southeast Europe, including Telenor Serbia. In March 2018, Telenor sold its business in Southeast Europe (Bulgaria, Hungary, Montenegro and Serbia) to the investment fund PPF, for a sum of 2.8 billion euros. As part of the deal, company continued using the brand "Telenor" until early 2022, when the rebranding was announced — since March of that year, the company would take a new name, "Yettel". On 1 April 2026, Serbia Broadband (SBB), a year after being acquired by PPF (parent company of Yettel Serbia), was merged into Yettel Serbia, with the current Yettel entity becoming its legal successor; SBB as a brand continued to exist.

== Mobile telephony ==
Yettel has a license to operate GSM networks in the range 900 MHz and 1800 MHz and UMTS / IMT 2000 network in the range 2100 MHz. This license was received on 31 December 2006. It is valid for 10 years with the possibility of renewing the license for an additional 10 years.

Network coverage

Yettel's GSM signal covers 99% of Serbia's inhabited territory and 91% of Serbia's land area. The company has more than 1033 active base transceiver stations (BTS) which cover all urban and suburban areas, major highway routes, and tourist centers. It has 2.96 million customers. The IMSI Network Code of Telenor is 220-01 and the MSISDN Network Codes are 062 (international: +381 62), 063 (international: +381 63) and 069 (international: +381 69).

- Identification code (IMSI) of Telenor is 220–01, and phone number prefixes are 062 (International: +381 62), 063 (International: +381 63) and 069 (International: +381 69).
- Roaming is enabled in 158 countries, or in 369 networks of foreign mobile operators, 2 Marine, 1 cheap and 1 satellite network.
- During 2013, Telenor built 372 new base stations, so that their total number at the end of the year amounted to 3048.
- At the beginning of 2011, Telenor put into operation one of the most modern data centers in South East Europe – Telenor Tier 3 data center, which houses the new core Telenor network.

The network coverage as of 31 December 2016:

- Coverage of the territory of Serbia with GSM signal is 91.90%
- Coverage of the population of Serbia with GSM signal is 99.42%
- Coverage of the territory of Serbia with UMTS signal is 91.02%
- Coverage of the population of Serbia with UMTS signal is 98.51%
- Coverage of the territory of Serbia with LTE signal is 9.95%
- Coverage of the population of Serbia with LTE signal is 53.78%

Network technology

- 2G (GSM, GPRS, EDGE up to 250 kbit/s) on 900 MHz and 1800 MHz
- 3G (HSPA+ up to 42 Mbit/s) on 900 MHz and 2100 MHz
- 4G (LTE up to 300 Mbit/s) on 800, 1800 and 2100 MHz

3G network

The EDGE network which represents 2.75 generation of mobile telephony or weak 3G has the same coverage as the GSM networks. This network has been in commercial operation since November 2004.

With its UMTS, HSDPA and HSPA + (3G and 3.5 G – generation of mobile telephony) signal Telenor covers over 98% of Serbia's population.

Telenor Serbia 3G network supports the following technologies in over 250 cities throughout Serbia, as well as all major roads with the following maximum theoretical speeds:

- HSPA + 42 – up to 42 Mbit/s when downloading flow up to 5.76 Mbit/s when sending data flow
- HSPA + – up to 21 Mbit/s when downloading flow up to 5.76 Mbit/s when sending data flow
- HSPA – up to 14.4 Mbit/s flow downloading and up to 2 Mbit/s when sending data flow
- HSDPA – up to 7.2 / 3.6 Mbit/s when downloading and flow rates up to 384 kbit/s when sending data flow.

4G network

In the middle of 2010, Telenor started a project of recovery of the existing network (NGN transition), as the main precondition for the introduction of next-generation mobile telephony (4G) and supporting advanced services. The realization of the project involved the companies Ericsson, Nera and LG.

== Fixed telephony ==
In 2010, Ratel delivered Telenor the second license for fixed telephony, which officially abolished the monopoly of Telekom Serbia in this field. Telenor was obliged to start providing fixed telephony services.

By signing the first commercial contract to provide fixed telephony services on 20 January 2011, Telenor has met the formal requirements of the license for the second fixed telephony operator. However, as of 2019 Telenor Serbia provides fixed telephony services only to businesses and not to home customers.

== Optical fiber Internet and IPTV ==
In 2021, Telenor announced its plans to offer optical fiber Internet, fixed telephony and IPTV to public. To do so, company started a highly controversial cooperation with one of its strongest competitors, a state-owned "Telekom Srbija", who leased its own backbone structure to "Telenor". It was to a dismay of yet another player on the market, United Group-owned cable and internet operator, Serbia Broadband. According to that position, the deal was concluded to diminish the influence of SBB and UG-owned channels for business and political reasons. Despite it, in November 2021, "Telenor" officially announced its offer under the brand "Hipernet". Although "Hipernet" is offered independently of mobile services, "Telenor" became only the second company to offer quadruple play on the Serbian market.

== Banking ==
On 26 April 2013, Telenor announced that it has reached an agreement on the purchase of KBC Bank in Serbia. According to the agreement, Telenor will buy 100% stake in KBC Bank, while Societe Generale Bank will take the portfolio of clients of KBC Bank, which includes 81,000 individuals, entrepreneurs, small and medium enterprises. In August 2017 Bulgarian investment fund River Styxx Capital has reached an agreement with Serbia's Telenor Banka to acquire 85 percent of its shares, while Telenor will maintain the remaining 15 percent. According to media reports, as of July 2017, the bank has more than 300.000 opened MC accounts.

== Partnerships ==
With Wikimedia

On 28 February 2012, Telenor Group and the Wikimedia Foundation announced a partnership under which Telenor customers in Asia and Southeastern Europe will be given free access to Wikipedia through a mobile phone. The offer is available to 135 million mobile users in Thailand, Malaysia, Pakistan, Bangladesh, India, Montenegro and Serbia. This agreement was implemented in the second quarter of 2012.

With the Ministry of Internal Affairs

On 17 June 2011, Serbian Interior Minister Ivica Dacic and Telenor CEO Kjell Morten - Johnsen signed an agreement on the application of filters to block access to illegal websites with elements of sexual abuse of children and presented to the public details of the project. Telenor users who try to access a website with illegal content, were automatically informed that they are trying to access forbidden sites, and the Interior Ministry will strive to establish such cooperation with other operators in country.

With Deezer

On 4 February 2013, Telenor established a partnership with one of the biggest music streaming services in the world, Deezer. Serbian customers are able to listen in online and offline mode to a range of over 25 million tracks by local and foreign artists.
