= Telemach (Slovenia) =

Slovenian telecommunications company

Telemach, širokopasovne komunikacije d.o.o.
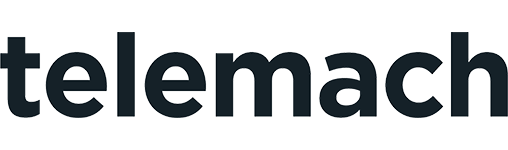
- Company type: Private
- Industry: Telecommunications
- Founded: 2006; 20 years ago
- Headquarters: Ljubljana
- Products: GSM, GPRS, MMS, EDGE, UMTS, HSDPA, HSUPA, LTE
- Owner: United Group
- Website: www.telemach.si

Telemach is the third largest mobile operator in Slovenia with over 600,000 customers.

== History ==
The company was established in 2006. Tušmobil gained its mobile license when US-based Western Wireless International (Vega) shut down its network at the end of May 2006. In March 2007, Tušmobil selected Nokia as its GSM/EDGE core and radio network supplier. Tušmobil officially started operations on 31 October 2007. In 2008, it also acquired a UMTS license. Tušmobil commercially launched UMTS 900 in July 2010. The network was upgraded to support HSPA+ in November 2010. In the last quarter of 2014, Tušmobil had a market share of 13%. Telemach acquired 100% of Tušmobil in April 2015. Telemach commercially launched LTE in June 2015 and renovated the existing GSM/UMTS network with equipment from one of the largest telecom equipment vendors Huawei.
