= Telenor Denmark =

Danish telecommunication company

- Type: Public
- Industry: Telecommunications
- Founded: 1991; 35 years ago (as Sonofon)
- Headquarters: Copenhagen, Denmark Aalborg, Denmark
- Area served: Denmark
- Services: Mobile phone services Internet carrier
- Revenue: ▲
- Operating income: ▼
- Net income: ▼
- Website: www.telenor.dk

Telenor Denmark is one of the four major Danish mobile network operators and has a customer base in excess of 1.4 million customers. Since 12 February 2004, it has been a subsidiary of the Norwegian telecommunications company Telenor ASA. Before June 2009, it traded as Sonofon; following a corporate rebrand in June 2009 the Danish operations adopted the Telenor name.

== History ==
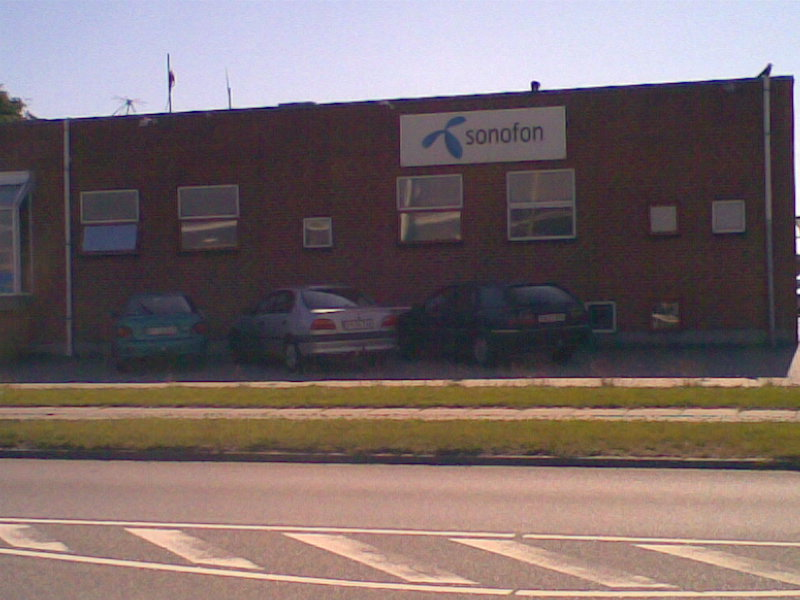
A Sonofon store in Tilst, June 2009

Sonofon was founded as a company in 1991 as a joint venture between GN Store Nord and BellSouth Corporation. On 9 September that year, Sonofon was awarded the license to operate Denmark's first GSM 900 mobile network (while the second GSM license was later awarded to Tele Danmark). Sonofon launched its services in September 1992 and saw its mobile base grow rapidly to half a million users by 1996. On 11 January 1998, Sonofon launched Denmark's first prepaid SIM cards, and in 2000 Sonofon launched GPRS on its network.

GN Store Nord sold its 53.1% stake in Sonofon for 13.1 billion DKK on 13 June 2000, and on 10 December 2003, Telenor acquired BellSouth's stake for 3.05 billion DKK.

Telenor acquired Cybercity, a leading Danish internet service provider, in 2005 and the acquisition was cleared by the Danish Competition Authority that July. In 2006, Cybercity initiated a tight cooperation with Sonofon, sharing headquarters on Frederikskaj in Copenhagen (where Sonofon's main administrative sections are housed), and even going as far as using Sonofon-hired and trained consultants within Sonofon's main call centre as a secondary base of customer service operations. Cybercity reported more than 186,000 DSL customers in its report for the first quarter of 2007, with more than 380 employees.

In May 2007, Telenor announced the purchase of the Danish operations of the competing ISP Tele2, with the Danish commission of monopoly approving the purchase. In September 2008 Sonofon, Cybercity, and Tele2 were merged into one company named Sonofon, with the brands subsequently rebranded as Telenor in June 2009.

Since 2012, Telenor and Telia have operated a shared nationwide radio access network in Denmark through their joint venture TT-Netværket P/S.

== See also ==
- List of mobile network operators in Europe
