= Orange Slovensko =

Slovakian telecommunications company

Orange Slovensko, a.s.
- Type: Private
- Industry: Telecommunications
- Founded: 15 January 1997
- Headquarters: Bratislava, Slovakia
- Key people: Mariusz Gatza (CEO) and chairman of the board
- Revenue: ▲€ 591 million (2023)
- Net income: ▲€ 82 million (2023)
- Number of employees: ▼1,041 (2023)
- Parent: Orange S.A.
- Website: www.orange.sk

Orange Slovensko, a.s. is a Slovak mobile network operator, also offering fibre connections, since 15 January 1997 (previously named Globtel), when it became the first mobile operator in Slovakia to operate the GSM digital mobile network at the 900 MHz frequency. On 15 November 1999, the company launched the commercial operation of the mobile network in the 1800 MHz frequency band. It is also the first company to cover more than 66% of the country with 3G HSDPA high-speed internet with the maximum speed of 42 Mbit/s, launched the HSPA+ upgrade to the maximum of 21.2-42.2 Mbit/s in 2011. The operator plans to commercially operate LTE network by the end of 2012.

Since 27 March 2002, the operator has been providing services under the Orange brand name.

The company operates a countrywide network covering 99% of the population and 2,4 million active customers as of 2024.

Orange S.A. now owns a 100% stake in Orange Slovensko.

The company has recently launched commercial operation of FTTH (fibre-to-the-home) providing digital TV, fixed phone line for free and a high-speed internet connection with 100 Mbit/s download and 100 Mbit/s upload. There is one Internet plan (called FiberNet Super) with speed up to 100 Mbit/s and upload up to 1 Mbit/s. But there is possibility of upload upgrade to 10 Mbit/s or 100 Mbit/s. The technology similar to Orange France livebox is called "Orange Doma" (Orange Home) in Slovakia.

Orange Slovensko is the major sponsor of Slovak National Ice Hockey Team and also sponsors events in Slovakia and projects for young people. It is also operating a charity foundation called Konto Orange. It had a commercial with Marian Hossa of the Detroit Red Wings promoting it, too.

Company's slogans: Budúcnosť je jasná, budúcnosť je Orange (The future's bright, the future's Orange), Je dobré byť Orange (It's good to be orange) and Bright Ideas for Business, Už 10 rokov Váš Orange (Already 10 years of your Orange), Orange svojim, Spájame vás s tým, na čom vám záleží (We connect you with what you care of).

Technologies: GSM, GPRS, EDGE, UMTS, HSDPA, HSUPA, HSPA+, BlackBerry and FTTH.

Prefixes: +421905; +421906; +421907; +421908; +421915; +421916; +421917; +421918; +421919; +421945
