= O2 Slovakia =

Telecommunications company in Slovakia

O2 Slovakia, s.r.o.
- Type: Private (subsidiary of O2 Czech Republic)
- Industry: Telecommunications
- Founded: 2006; 20 years ago
- Headquarters: Bratislava, Slovakia
- Area served: Slovakia
- Services: Telecommunications
- Owner: e& (50.01%); PPF (49.99%)
- Parent: e& PPF Telecom Group
- Divisions: Telecommunication
- Website: www.o2.sk

O2 Slovakia, s.r.o. is a provider of mobile service in Slovakia. O2 started as Telefónica in Slovakia with commercial services on 2 February 2007 with about 600.000 preregistered users, and ~400,000 Slovaks actively using the O_{2} service. The operator has 2 370 000 active users today. The company is subsidiary of O2 Czech Republic, itself owned by PPF.

== Prefix ==
Users are identified by prefix 940, 944, 948 and 949 in mobile number. (+421 94x yyy yyy)

== Headquarters ==
O2 Slovakia, s.r.o, Pribinova 40, 811 09 Bratislava, Slovakia
