= Slovak Telekom =

Slovak telecommunications company

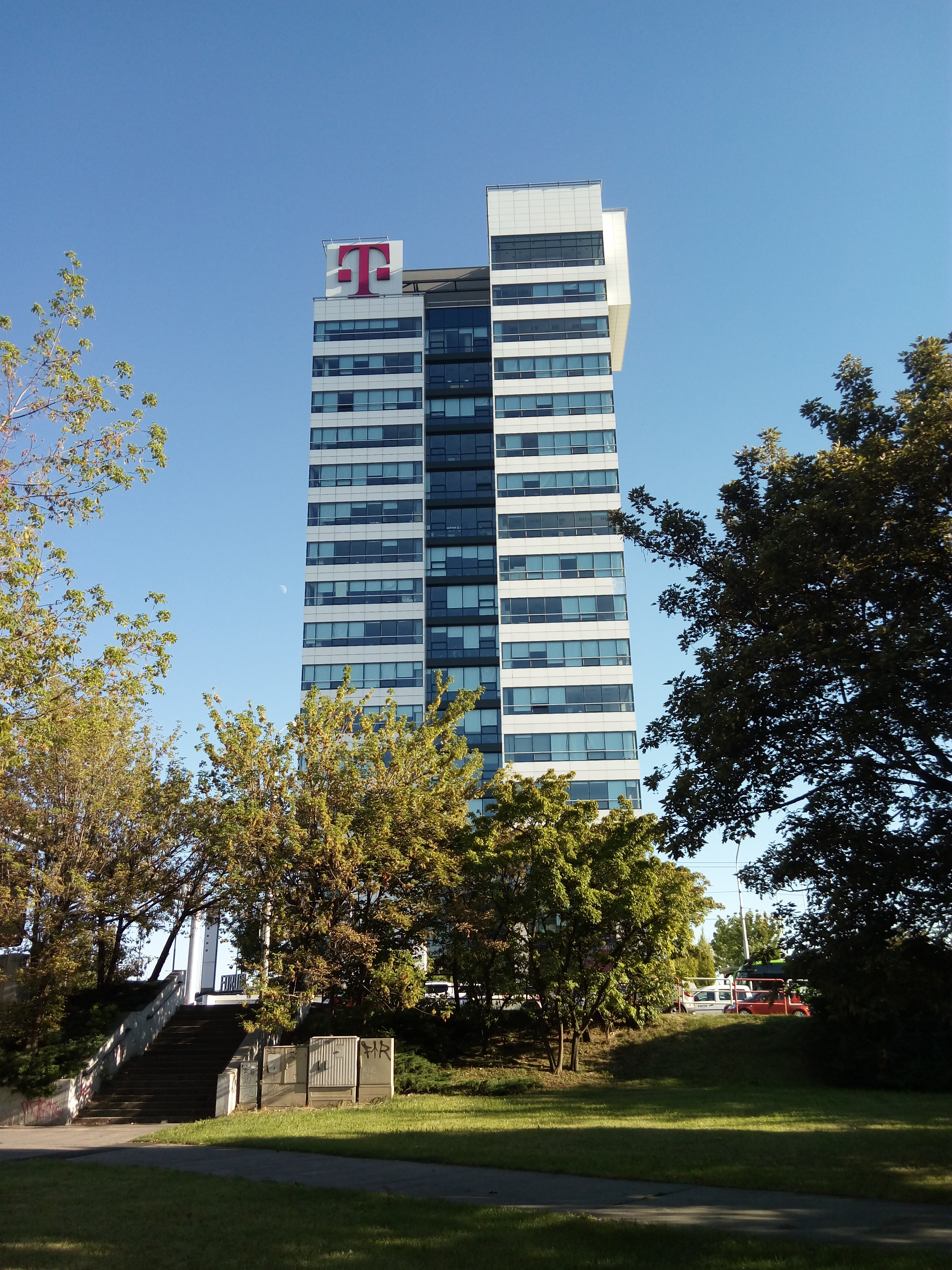
- Type: Subsidiary
- Industry: Telecommunications
- Headquarters: Bratislava, Slovakia
- Area served: Slovakia
- Revenue: 864,500,000 euro (2025)
- Net income: 124,300,000 euro (2025)
- Number of employees: 2,999 (2018)
- Parent: Deutsche Telekom
- Website: www.telekom.sk

Slovak Telekom logo (February 2006–January 2012)

Slovak Telecom logo, 2004–'06. By that time, it was one of the few Deutsche Telekom companies without the Telekom "T" in its logo.

Slovak Telekom is the convergent telco provider with the largest internet, fixed-line, digital TV, ICT and mobile services portfolio. The company is wholly owned subsidiary of Deutsche Telekom AG.

The Slovak Telekom Group consists of the parent company Slovak Telekom a.s. and its subsidiaries Zoznam s.r.o., Zoznam Mobile s.r.o., Telekom Sec s.r.o., PosAm s.r.o., and DIGI SLOVAKIA s.r.o.

== History ==
Until 1 July 2010, T-Mobile Slovensko was a mobile operator and a separate company owned by Slovak Telekom. After this date, T-Mobile was merged with the parent company Slovak Telekom.

Until 2 May 2005, T-Mobile Slovensko operated under the name EuroTel Bratislava.

== Services ==
As of April 2018, Slovak Telekom covers 93% of Slovak population with 4G mobile network, introduced LTE-A technology to various towns in Slovakia, with speeds up to 375 Mbit/s. It also introduced VoLTE (Voice over LTE) technology that allows calls directly in 4G, without need to switch to 3G and 2G.

Digital television service of Slovak Telekom, Magio TV, reached 600,000 customers in Q1 2018. The company also branched out to a new line of products for connected home and internet of things (IoT) and introduced a Magenta SmartHome brand.

Slovak Telekom had four strategic priorities in 2017: innovations, the best connectivity, superior user experience and digital television.

Technologies: GSM, GPRS, EDGE, UMTS, HSDPA, LTE-A, VoLTE, Flash-OFDM, VDSL, FTTH

Prefixes: +421901; +421902, +421903, +421904, +421910, +421911, +421912, +421914

== Corporate Responsibility ==
Slovak Telekom promotes the value of social inclusiveness and empathy within the company and in public, through a long-term support for the Slovak community of people with hearing impairment: supporting their entrepreneurship skills, better education of children through a program of visiting personal tutors, and by providing services of online interpreters.

== Communication ==
Since 2018, the new public face of the company in advertising campaigns is Bekim, a Slovak comedian and rapper, who started to use a wheelchair after he suffered an accident during a bicycle motocross competition in 2005. Bekim follows Peter Sagan, a famous Slovak professional road bicycle racer, who represented Slovak Telekom before him. The company's slogan is “ÁNO” (“YES”) symbolizing a yell of an inventor who shouts “Yes” after coming up with some new technology. It also represents a defiant call that “Nothing is impossible”, “I say yes to a challenge” and “I will make it”.
