= Yettel Bulgaria =

Bulgarian telecommunications company

- Native name: Йеттел България
- Formerly: Telenor, Globul
- Type: LLC
- Industry: Mobile Telecommunications
- Founded: 17 September 2001; 25 years ago (as Globul)
- Headquarters: Sofia, Bulgaria
- Key people: Jason King, Chairman and CEO
- Products: Mobile telephony; Internet service provider
- Revenue: ▲€425 million (2021)
- Net income: 211,000,000 Bulgarian lev (2021)
- Total assets: 398,000,000 Bulgarian lev (2021)
- Owner: e& (50%); PPF (50%)
- Number of employees: 1,900 (2022)
- Parent: OTE (2001–13); Telenor (2013–18); PPF (2018–2024); e& PPF Telecom Group (2024–present)
- Website: www.yettel.bg

Yettel Bulgaria (formerly known as Telenor Bulgaria) is the third largest mobile network and the third largest fixed telecommunications company in Bulgaria. The company was founded under the name "Cosmo Bulgaria Mobile" in 2001 by OTE and operated under the brand name "Globul" until 2014.

In 2013 it was bought by Telenor and changed its name. In August 2018, the company was acquired by PPF, a Czech private investment fund. The company continued to use the Telenor brand until 1 March 2022, when it was renamed to Yettel Bulgaria. In February 2024, the company was acquired by e& (Etisalat), and the merger was approved by Bulgaria's competition watchdog. However the branding of Yettel has not yet been changed.

== History ==
The company was founded in 2001 by telecommunications corporation OTE group, from 2005 to 2013 it was part of the Cosmote brand line of the group, since August 2013, is 100% owned by Norwegian telecommunications corporation Telenor which acquired it from OTE in for EUR 717 million.

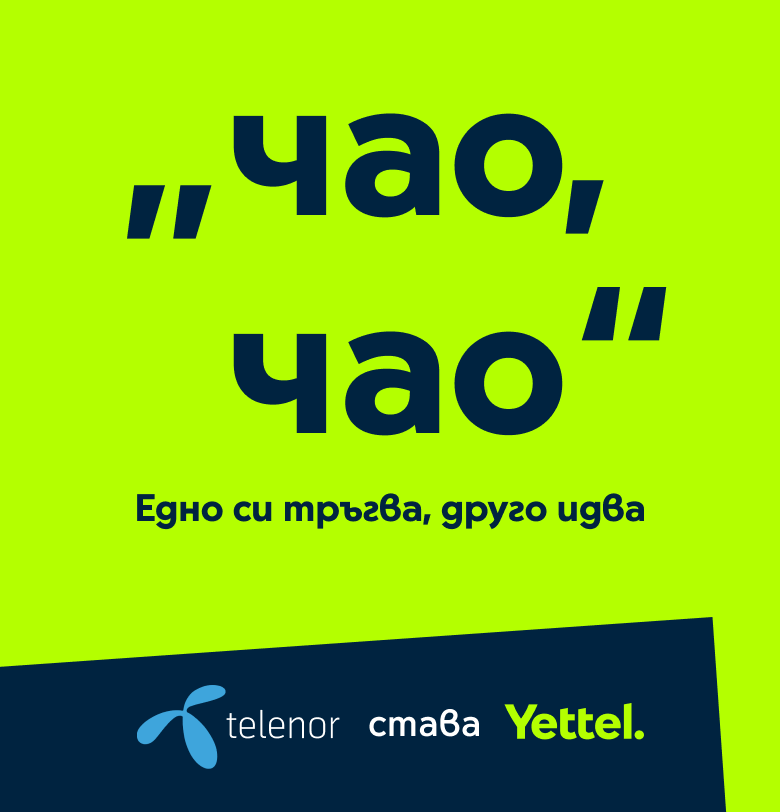
Advertisement announcing Telenor's rebranding

At the end of 2012, Globul reported 4.5 million subscribers (up from 3.9 million in March 2011), with 36% subscriber market share. As of 2012, Globul had about 62% contract subscribers, about 38% prepaid subscribers, and abound 220,000 fixed-line subscribers.

Globul changed its company logo in June 2006 to unify it with the Cosmote brand.

The second rebranding started on October 16, 2014 after Telenor's acquisition. The rebrand was complete on November 4, 2014.

In January 2018, the company's management confirmed media reports that there is interest in sale of Telenor's business in Southeast Europe, including Telenor Bulgaria. In March 2018, Telenor sold its business in Central and East Europe (Bulgaria, Hungary, Montenegro and Serbia) to the investment fund PPF, for a sum of 2.8 billion euros.

On March 1, 2022, Telenor Bulgaria underwent a third rebranding, being renamed Yettel Bulgaria. The name change was a part of the wider rebranding initiative in Bulgaria, Hungary and Serbia where the PPF’s Telenor branded businesses operate.

In 2023, it was reported that PPF was considering selling its stake in Yettel to UAE-based Telecommunications group e& (Etisalat). In 2024, Bulgaria’s competition watchdog approved the sale of Yettel Bulgaria alongside infrastructure provider Cetin Bulgaria to e& (Etisalat).

== Network ==
As of 2012, Globul's GSM network covers 99,98% of Bulgaria's population and 99,48% of the country's territory. The company has roaming agreements with over 400 operators in more than 170 countries and territories worldwide. In 2005, Globul received a license for developing and implementing 3G UMTS mobile telecommunications network as well as a fixed telephony license. 3G services were launched in September 2006 and have since been upgraded to support HSPA+ with speeds of up to 42 Mbit/s download and 5.76 Mbit/s upload. As of December 2012, Globul's UMTS network covers 94,81% of the country's population. Yettel uses the access code 089. Until 2003, it used the codes 099 and 098, the later having been added as the network had expanded. In mid-2003, however, mobile numbers in Bulgaria increased by one digit (by adding an initial -8-) and the network code changed to 089 only. Alongside Globul, OTE had also owned one of the two public telephone networks in the country – BulFon, which it sold back to the Bulgarian Telecommunications Company in 2005.

After Telenor acquired Globul was made the intent that the whole existing network (both 2G and 3G) shall be rebuilt. Later in a press release it was revealed that Huawei had been selected. In early 2013 the process has already begun. Telenor created a specific webpage that shows in which region and when the network would be rebuilt. The deadline is by mid 2015. Telenor also said that the network that they build would be easily made 4G LTE when the market indicates that it is ready for it.

=== LTE ===
Yettel offers 4G services under the LTE standard in the 1,800 MHz band to all of its customers from 1 December 2015 in 53 cities and 2 resorts with coverage to 56.73% of the country's population. Further expansion is expected in 2016, including Bulgaria's popular seaside resorts. The maximum speed of the Telenor 4G network is 75 Мbps. The service is initially available in Sofia and most of southern Bulgaria. By mid-December, Telenor's LTE service will cover all Bulgarian cities with a population of more than 20,000, including all regional centres and the most popular winter resorts.

Telenor said it will continue to expand the coverage and the capacity of its LTE network, depending on spectrum availability, further into 2016. Telenor 4G services are available at no additional cost until 31 January 2016 to all customers with 4G-enabled handsets and SIM cards, which are all Telenor SIM cards (including 3in1 SIMs) purchased or replaced in the last several years. Users with older SIM cards will be able to replace them free of charge at any Telenor or official partner shop where a wide variety of 4G-enabled devices is also available after 1 December.

In April 2016 Telenor announced that its LTE network covers all residential areas with over 5,000 inhabitants and provides fast data transfer for 75% of the Bulgarian's population.

In May 2016, Telenor was awarded 2x5MHz additional spectrum in the 1800 MHz band from CRC.The additional frequencies will be used for further improving the quality of the company's 4G LTE services by allowing Telenor to increase the maximum theoretical data speed in its 4G network to 100 Mbit/s.

=== 5G ===
Telenor Bulgaria completed Bulgaria's first live 5G video call during a public test session on 19 August 2019. On 10 June 2021, Telenor Bulgaria officially launched 5G services nationwide during an event in Burgas attended by clients and officials. During its more than 20 years in the Bulgarian market, the company achieved several firsts in wireless, launching Bulgaria’s first commercial 4G network in 2015, the first VoLTE service in 2018 and paving the way for the development of 5G with the country’s first 5G network test.

== Other ==
In 2006, Globul launched i-mode in Bulgaria. Globul was the first operator worldwide to introduce Nokia i-mode handsets in September 2007. In 2007 Globul launched BlackBerry, the service is accessible from the network of Globul as well as from the roaming partners of Globul. In March 2009, GLOBUL launched iPhone 3G in Bulgaria and four months later offered the new iPhone 3GS. In August 2010, offered iPhone 4. The mobile operator was the first in Bulgaria to propose an integrated solution for fixed and mobile telephony with the MVPN service, Office Zone and Student Zone.

In 2007 Globul received a license for 802.16 point-to-multipoint network in the 26 GHz band. The company uses WiBAS technology for broadband wireless transmission in the major cities. In 2009, Globul started fast-speed broadband Internet services.

== See also ==
- Internet service provider
- List of mobile network operators in Europe
- Mobile telephony
