= 4iG =

Hungarian ICT and telecommunications company

4iG is a Budapest-based IT company listed in the premium category of the Budapest Stock Exchange. In the company's name, 4i refers to the English words International, Innovative, IT and Investment, while G refers to a group. Its predecessor is the IT-focused FreeSoft, founded in 1990.

== History ==
FreeSoft was introduced to the Budapest Stock Exchange in 2004. In 2020, the company founded a new subsidiary with Antenna Hungária Zrt. and New Space Industries Zrt., whose goal was to launch a satellite into space in 2024. In the fall of 2020, the company acquired a controlling stake of 70% in INNObyte Zrt., which primarily specializes in the fields of artificial intelligence and blockchain.
