= Yettel Hungary =

Hungarian telecommunications company

Yettel Magyarország Zrt.
- Company type: Private
- Industry: Mobile Telecommunications
- Founded: February 1994; 32 years ago (as Pannon GSM)
- Headquarters: Törökbálint, Hungary
- Products: 5G, 4G and 4G+, UMTS, W-CDMA, EDGE, GPRS, GSM
- Revenue: 530,000,000 euro (2018)
- Net income: 98,000,000 euro (2018)
- Owner: e& (50%); PPF (50%)
- Parent: e& PPF Telecom Group
- Website: www.yettel.hu

Yettel Hungary (formerly Telenor, Pannon and Pannon GSM) is the second largest mobile phone operator in Hungary. Yettel Hungary Ltd. was founded as Pannon GSM Telecommunications Ltd. in 1994.

== History ==
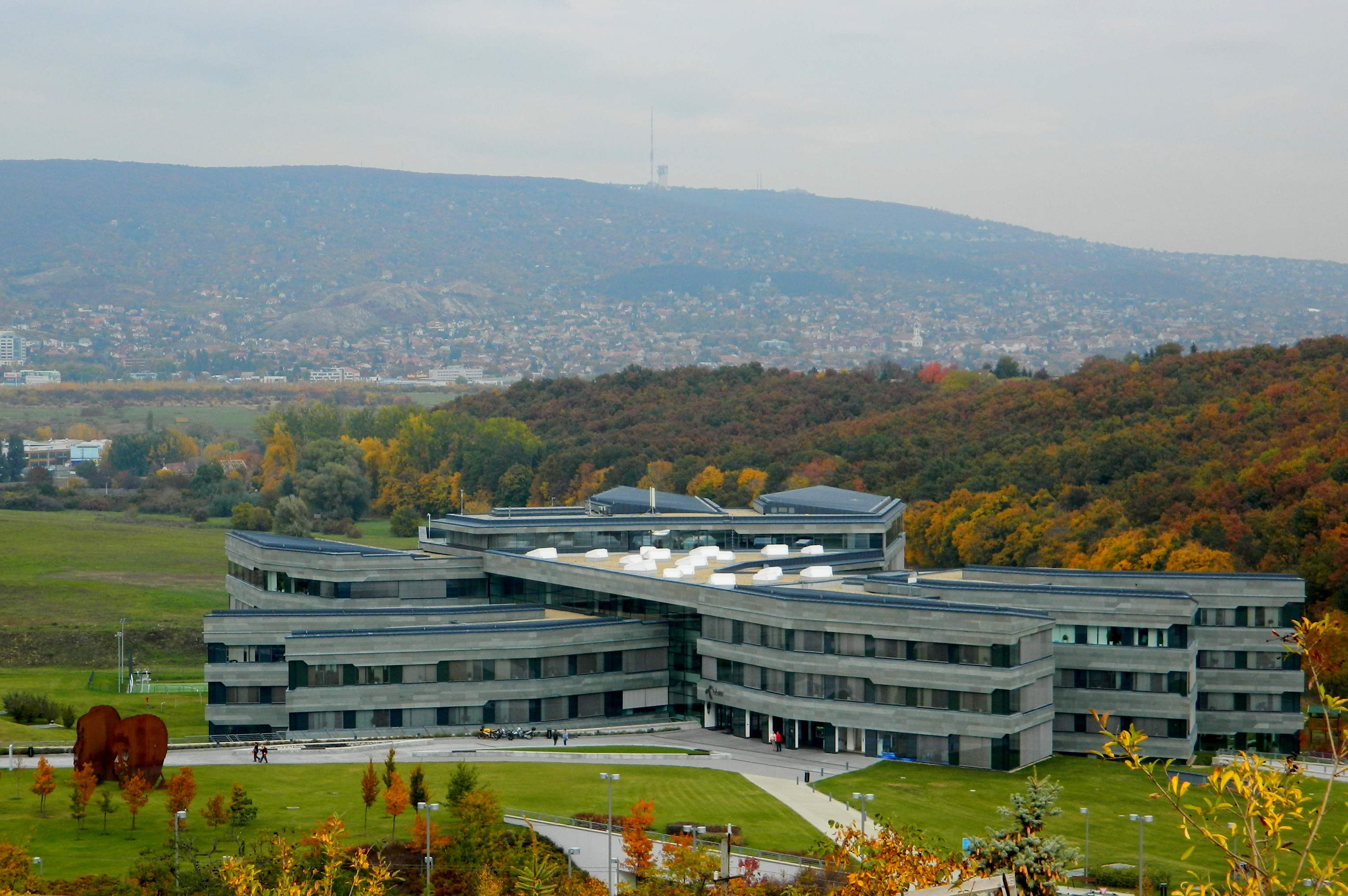
Yettel head offices in Hungary

In November, 1993 Pannon GSM Telecommunications Ltd. signed a concession agreement and in March of the following year started to operate on the 900 MHz frequency. In 1999 the company won a tender for the 1800 MHz frequency. In November, 2000 it started to operate on the 1800 MHz frequency in Budapest, and in March 2001, the whole country.

The network covers 99% of Hungary. The company has 13 switching centres, more than 1500 base stations and employs 1,060 people. The company's revenue in 2001 was HUF 132.8 billion and profits before taxes were HUF 18.7 billion.

On January 31, 2003 the company had 2,627,000 subscribers representing 40% of the Hungarian mobile market, which was then shared by 3 companies.

Telenor Hungary logo (2010-2022)

On February 14, 2006 the company changed its main brand to Pannon and refreshed its visual image, in line with the new corporate identity of its parent, Telenor. On May 18, 2010 the company changed its name to Telenor.

In 2009, the fairness of Pannon's consumer contract terms was challenged in the Hungarian courts. A reference was made to the European Court of Justice for a preliminary ruling concerning the role of EU member states' national courts in dealing with such challenges, which reinforced the ruling that the courts must examine potentially unfair terms and not apply them if they were found to be unfair, except where the consumer is opposed to that non-application. Whether the terms were actually unfair was referred back to the Hungarian court for resolution.

In January 2018, the company's management confirmed media reports that there is interest in sale of Telenor's business in southeastern Europe, including Telenor Hungary. In March 2018, Telenor sold its business in southeastern Europe (Bulgaria, Hungary, Montenegro and Serbia) to the investment fund PPF, for a sum of 2.8 billion euros.

In January 2022, Telenor announced they would change their name to Yettel on March 1, 2022.

== Network information ==
The IMSI - Network Code of Yettel is 216-1 and MSISDN Network Codes are 20 (international: +36 20).

The display name of Yettel: Yettel HU.
