= Mobile network codes in ITU region 6xx (Africa) =

This list contains the mobile country codes and mobile network codes for networks with country codes between 600 and 699, inclusively – a region that covers Africa and the surrounding islands (excluding the Canary Islands and Madeira, which are part of Spain and Portugal, respectively).

== National operators ==
=== A ===
==== Algeria – DZ ====
MCC	MNC	Brand	Operator	Status	Bands (MHz)	References and notes
603	01	Mobilis	ATM Mobilis S.P.A.	Operational	GSM 900 / GSM 1800 / UMTS 2100 / LTE 1800	
603	02	Djezzy	Optimum Télécom Algérie S.P.A.	Operational	GSM 900 / GSM 1800 / UMTS 2100 / LTE 1800	Former Orascom Telecom
603	03	Ooredoo	Wataniya Télécom Algérie S.P.A.	Operational	GSM 900 / GSM 1800 / UMTS 2100 / LTE 1800	Former Nedjma
603	07	AT	Algérie Télécom	Not operational	CDMA 1900	Wireless Local Loop; MNC withdrawn
603	09	AT	Algérie Télécom S.P.A.	Operational	LTE	Fixed Wireless Broadband
603	21	ANESRIF	ANESRIF	Operational	GSM-R	Railway communications

==== Angola – AO ====
MCC	MNC	Brand	Operator	Status	Bands (MHz)	References and notes
631	02	UNITEL	UNITEL S.a.r.l.	Operational	GSM 900 / GSM 1800 / UMTS 2100 / LTE 1800 / 5G 3500	
631	04	MOVICEL	MOVICEL Telecommunications S.A.	Operational	GSM 900 / GSM 1800 / UMTS 900 / LTE 1800	CDMA shut down March 2016
631	05		Africell	Operational	LTE 1800 / 5G 3500	5G network activated 18 Jul 2022. ITU assignment; Luanda pilot mid-2023

=== B ===
==== Benin – BJ ====
MCC	MNC	Brand	Operator	Status	Bands (MHz)	References and notes
616	01		Benin Telecoms Mobile	Operational	LTE 1800 / CDMA / WiMAX	Brands are:- Telecoms (LTE), Kanakoo (CDMA / WiMAX); Libercom GSM shut down 2018
616	02	Moov	Telecel Benin	Operational	GSM 900 / UMTS 2100	EtiSalat / Atlantique Telecom / Moov
616	03	MTN	Spacetel Benin	Operational	GSM 900 / GSM 1800 / UMTS 900 / UMTS 2100 / LTE 1800 / 5G 3500	Former BeninCell, Areeba
616	04	BBCOM	Bell Benin Communications	Not operational	GSM 900 / GSM 1800	GSM Licence revoked on 2017-08-02
616	05	Glo	Glo Communication Benin	Not operational	GSM 900 / GSM 1800	Licence revoked in 2017
616	07	Celtiis	SBIN	Operational	GSM 900 / GSM 1800 / UMTS 900 / UMTS 2100 / LTE 1800	Launched 21 Oct 2022

==== Botswana – BW ====
MCC	MNC	Brand	Operator	Status	Bands (MHz)	References and notes
652	01	Mascom	Mascom Wireless (Pty) Limited	Operational	GSM 900 / UMTS 2100 / LTE 1800 / 5G	5G service launched 25 Feb 2022
652	02	Orange	Orange (Botswana) Pty Limited	Operational	GSM 900 / UMTS 2100 / LTE 1800 / LTE 2100 / TD-LTE / 5G	Commercial 5G launch 11 Nov 2022. formerly Vista Cellular
652	04	BTC Mobile	Botswana Telecommunications Corporation	Operational	GSM 900 / GSM 1800 / UMTS 2100 / LTE 1800	rebranded in 2017 (was beMobile)
652	06		Paratus Telecommunications (Pty) Ltd	unknown	Unknown	

==== Burkina Faso – BF ====
MCC	MNC	Brand	Operator	Status	Bands (MHz)	References and notes
613	01	Moov	Moov Africa Burkina Faso	Operational	GSM 900 / UMTS 2100 / LTE 1800	Former Onatel
613	02	Orange	Orange Burkina Faso	Operational	GSM 900 / UMTS 2100 / LTE 1800	Former Zain/Celtel, Airtel
613	03	Telecel Faso	Telecel Faso SA	Operational	GSM 900 / LTE 1800	

==== Burundi – BI ====
MCC	MNC	Brand	Operator	Status	Bands (MHz)	References and notes
642	01	econet Leo	Econet Wireless Burundi PLC	Operational	GSM 900 / GSM 1800 / UMTS 2100 / LTE 1800	Former Spacetel
642	02	Tempo	VTEL MEA	Not operational	GSM 900	Former Safaris; not related to Africell; suspended in 2015; MNC withdrawn
642	03	Onatel	Onatel Burundi	Operational	GSM 900	
642	07	Smart Mobile	LACELL SU	Not operational	GSM 1800 / UMTS 2100	suspended in 2022
642	08	Lumitel	Viettel Burundi	Operational	GSM 900 / GSM 1800 / UMTS 900 / UMTS 2100 / LTE 1800	Formerly HiTs Telecom
642	82	econet Leo	Econet Wireless Burundi PLC	Operational	GSM 900 / GSM 1800 / UMTS 2100	Formerly Telecel, then U-COM Burundi

=== C ===
==== Cameroon – CM ====
MCC	MNC	Brand	Operator	Status	Bands (MHz)	References and notes
624	01	MTN Cameroon	Mobile Telephone Network Cameroon Ltd	Operational	GSM 900 / UMTS 2100 / TD-LTE 2500	
624	02	Orange	Orange Cameroun S.A.	Operational	GSM 900 / UMTS 2100 / LTE 1800	
624	03	Camtel	Camtel	Operational	CDMA / LTE 1800	
624	04	Nexttel	Viettel Cameroun	Operational	GSM 900 / GSM 1800 / UMTS 2100	

==== Cape Verde – CV ====
MCC	MNC	Brand	Operator	Status	Bands (MHz)	References and notes
625	01	CVMOVEL	CVMóvel, S.A.	Operational	GSM 900 / UMTS 2100 / LTE 800	
625	02	T+	UNITEL T+ TELECOMUNICACÕES, S.A.	Operational	GSM 1800 / UMTS 2100	

==== Central African Republic – CF ====
MCC	MNC	Brand	Operator	Status	Bands (MHz)	References and notes
623	01	Moov	Atlantique Telecom Centrafrique SA	Operational	GSM 900	Former Centrafrique Telecom Plus, Etisalat
623	02	TC	Telecel Centrafrique	Operational	GSM 900 / UMTS 2100	
623	03	Orange	Orange RCA	Operational	GSM 900 / GSM 1800 / UMTS 2100 / WiMAX	
623	04	Azur	Azur RCA	Operational	GSM 900 / UMTS 2100	Former Nationlink Telecom RCA

==== Chad – TD ====
MCC	MNC	Brand	Operator	Status	Bands (MHz)	References and notes
622	01	Airtel	Bharti Airtel SA	Operational	GSM 900 / UMTS 900 / UMTS 2100 / LTE 1800	
622	02	Tawali	SotelTchad	Operational	CDMA2000	semi-fixed line; formerly Tchad Mobile / Orascom Telecom GSM 900 - defunct in 2004
622	03	Tigo	Millicom	Operational	GSM 900 / GSM 1800 / UMTS 2100 / LTE 2600	
622	07	Salam	SotelTchad	Operational	GSM 900 / GSM 1800	

==== Comoros – KM ====
MCC	MNC	Brand	Operator	Status	Bands (MHz)	References and notes
654	01	HURI	Comores Telecom	Operational	GSM 900 / UMTS 900	
654	02	TELCO SA	Telecom Malagasy (Telma)	Operational	GSM 900 / UMTS 900 / LTE 800	

==== Congo – CG ====
MCC	MNC	Brand	Operator	Status	Bands (MHz)	References and notes
629	01	Airtel	Celtel Congo	Operational	GSM 900 / GSM 1800 / UMTS 900 / UMTS 2100 / LTE 2600	Former Zain and Celtel brand
629	07	Airtel	Warid Telecom	Operational	GSM 900	Acquired by Airtel in 2014
629	10	Libertis Telecom	MTN CONGO S.A	Operational	GSM 900 / GSM 1800 / UMTS 2100 / LTE 2600 / 5G 3500	5G launched 22 Nov 2024

=== D ===
==== Democratic Republic of the Congo – CD ====
MCC	MNC	Brand	Operator	Status	Bands (MHz)	References and notes
630	01	Vodacom	Vodacom Congo RDC sprl	Operational	GSM 900 / GSM 1800 / UMTS 2100 / TD-LTE 3500 / WiMAX 3500	
630	02	Airtel	Airtel sprl	Operational	GSM 900 / UMTS 2100 / LTE 1800	
630	05	Supercell	Supercell SPRL	Operational	GSM 900 / GSM 1800	
630	86	Orange RDC	Orange RDC sarl	Operational	GSM 900 / GSM 1800 / UMTS 2100 / TD-LTE 2600 / 5G	
630	88	YTT	Yozma Timeturns sprl	Not operational	GSM 900 / GSM 1800	Planned
630	89	Orange RDC	Orange RDC sarl	Operational	GSM 900 / GSM 1800 / UMTS 2100	Former OASIS, Tigo; acquired by Orange 2016
630	90	Africell	Africell RDC sprl	Operational	GSM 900 / GSM 1800	

==== Djibouti – DJ ====
MCC	MNC	Brand	Operator	Status	Bands (MHz)	References and notes
638	01	Evatis	Djibouti Telecom SA	Operational	GSM 900 / UMTS 2100 / LTE 800 / LTE 1800	

=== E ===
==== Egypt – EG ====
MCC	MNC	Brand	Operator	Status	Bands (MHz)	References and notes
602	01	Orange	Orange Egypt	Operational	GSM 900 / GSM 1800 / UMTS 2100 / LTE 1800 / 5G 2500	Former Mobinil; 5G launched 12 Jun 2025
602	02	Vodafone	Vodafone Egypt	Operational	GSM 900 / GSM 1800 / UMTS 2100 / LTE 1800 / 5G 2500	5G launched 17 Jun 2025
602	03	e&	e& Egypt	Operational	GSM 900 / GSM 1800 / UMTS 2100 / LTE 1800 / 5G 2500	Former Etisalat
602	04	WE	Telecom Egypt	Operational	LTE 1800 / 5G 2500	

==== Equatorial Guinea – GQ ====
MCC	MNC	Brand	Operator	Status	Bands (MHz)	References and notes
627	01	Orange GQ	GETESA	Operational	GSM 900 / LTE	
627	03	Muni	Green Com S.A.	Operational	GSM 900 / GSM 1800 / UMTS 900 / LTE	Former HiTS

==== Eritrea – ER ====
MCC	MNC	Brand	Operator	Status	Bands (MHz)	References and notes
657	01	Eritel	Eritrea Telecommunications Services Corporation	Operational	GSM 900 / CDMA	CDMA for fixed wireless

==== Eswatini – SZ ====
MCC	MNC	Brand	Operator	Status	Bands (MHz)	References and notes
653	01		SPTC	Unknown	Unknown	
653	02		Eswatini Mobile Limited	Operational	LTE 1800	
653	10	MTN Eswatini	MTN Eswatini Limited	Operational	GSM 900 / LTE 1800	

==== Ethiopia – ET ====
MCC	MNC	Brand	Operator	Status	Bands (MHz)	References and notes
636	01	MTN	Ethio Telecom	Operational	GSM 900 / GSM 1800 / UMTS 2100 / LTE 1800 / 5G	
636	02	Safari	Safaricom Telecommunications Ethiopia	Operational	GSM900 / UMTS 2100 / LTE 1800	

=== F ===
==== French Departments and Territories in the Indian Ocean (France) – YT/RE ====
Includes

- Mayotte (France) – YT
- Réunion (France) – RE

MCC	MNC	Brand	Operator	Status	Bands (MHz)	References and notes
647	00	Orange	Orange La Réunion	Operational	GSM 900 / GSM 1800 / UMTS 2100 / LTE 1800 / 5G 3500	Mayotte, Réunion
647	01	Maoré Mobile	BJT Partners	Not operational	LTE 1800	Mayotte; MNC withdrawn
647	02	Only	Telco OI	Operational	GSM 900 / GSM 1800 / UMTS 900 / UMTS 2100 / LTE 800 / LTE 1800 / LTE 2100 / LTE 2600	Mayotte
647	03	Free	Telco OI	Operational	GSM 900 / GSM 1800 / UMTS 900 / UMTS 2100 / LTE 800 / LTE 1800 / LTE 2100 / LTE 2600	Réunion Former Only
647	04	Zeop	Zeop mobile	Operational	LTE 1800 / LTE 2100 / LTE 2600	
647	10	SFR Réunion	Société Réunionnaise du Radiotéléphone	Operational	GSM 900 / UMTS 900 / UMTS 2100 / LTE 800 / LTE 1800 / LTE 2600	Mayotte, Réunion; LTE bands 20 / 3 / 7

=== G ===
==== Gabon – GA ====
MCC	MNC	Brand	Operator	Status	Bands (MHz)	References and notes
628	01	Libertis	Gabon Telecom S.A.	Operational	GSM 900 / UMTS 2100 / LTE 800 / LTE 1800 / LTE 2600	
628	02	Moov	Gabon Telecom S.A.	Operational	GSM 900 / UMTS 2100 / LTE 800 / LTE 1800 / LTE 2600	Former Atlantique Télécom (Etisalat Group), merged with Gabon Telecom in 2016
628	03	Airtel	Airtel Gabon S.A.	Operational	GSM 900 / UMTS 2100 / LTE 2100	
628	04	Azur	USAN Gabon S.A.	Not operational	GSM 900 / GSM 1800	Shut down 2018
628	05	RAG	Réseau de l’Administration Gabonaise	Unknown	Unknown	
628	06	Airtel	Airtel Gabon S.A.	Unknown	Unknown	

==== Gambia – GM ====
MCC	MNC	Brand	Operator	Status	Bands (MHz)	References and notes
607	01	Gamcel	Gamcel	Operational	GSM 900 / GSM 1800 / UMTS 2100	
607	02	Africell	Africell	Operational	GSM 900 / GSM 1800 / UMTS 2100 / LTE 1800	
607	03	Comium	Comium	Operational	GSM 900 / GSM 1800	
607	04	QCell	QCell Gambia	Operational	GSM 900 / GSM 1800 / UMTS 2100 / LTE 1800 / 5G	
607	05		Gamtel-Ecowan	Unknown	WiMAX / LTE	
607	06		NETPAGE	Operational	TD-LTE 2300	

==== Ghana – GH ====
MCC	MNC	Brand	Operator	Status	Bands (MHz)	References and notes
620	01	MTN	MTN Group	Operational	GSM 900 / GSM 1800 / UMTS 900 / UMTS 2100 / LTE 800 / LTE 2600	former spacefon
620	02	Vodafone	Vodafone Group	Operational	GSM 900 / GSM 1800 / UMTS 2100 / LTE 800 / LTE 1800	former Onetouch, Ghana Telecom
620	03	AT Ghana	AT Ghana Ltd.	Operational	GSM 900 / GSM 1800 / UMTS 2100	Re-brand from AirtelTigo (Jan 2024)
620	04	Expresso	Kasapa / Hutchison Telecom	Operational	CDMA2000 850	former Kasapa
620	05		National Security	Unknown	Unknown	
620	06	AT Ghana	AT Ghana Ltd.	Operational	GSM 900 / GSM 1800 / UMTS 2100	Second MNC for same network
620	07	Globacom	Globacom Group	Operational	GSM 900 / GSM 1800 / UMTS 2100	
620	08	Surfline	Surfline Communications Ltd	Not operational	LTE 2600	LTE band 7; shut down Oct 2018
620	09	NITA	National Information Technology Agency	Unknown	Unknown	
620	10	Blu	Blu Telecommunications	Operational	TD-LTE 2500	LTE band 41
620	11		Netafrique Dot Com Ltd	Unknown	Unknown	
620	12		BTL	Unknown	Unknown	
620	13		Goldkey	Unknown	Unknown	
620	14	busy	BusyInternet	Operational	TD-LTE 2300	
620	15		Lebara	Operational	MVNO	
620	16		Telesol	Operational	LTE 1800	data only
620	17		iBurst Africa	Unknown	Unknown	

==== Guinea – GN ====
MCC	MNC	Brand	Operator	Status	Bands (MHz)	References and notes
611	01	Orange	Orange S.A.	Operational	GSM 900 / GSM 1800 / LTE	former Spacetel
611	02	Guinée Télécom	Guinée Télécom	Not operational	GSM 900	Formerly Sotelgui Lagui, Went bankrupt on 2012; no service
611	03	Intercel	Intercel Guinée	Not operational	GSM 900	former Telecel; license revoked Oct 2018
611	04	MTN	Areeba Guinea	Operational	GSM 900 / GSM 1800 / UMTS 2100	
611	05	Cellcom	Cellcom	Operational	GSM 900 / GSM 1800 / UMTS 2100	

==== Guinea-Bissau – GW ====
MCC	MNC	Brand	Operator	Status	Bands (MHz)	References and notes
632	01	Guinetel	Guinétel S.A.	Operational	GSM 900 / GSM 1800	
632	02	MTN Areeba	Spacetel Guiné-Bissau S.A.	Operational	GSM 900 / GSM 1800 / UMTS 2100	
632	03	Orange		Operational	GSM 900 / GSM 1800 / UMTS 2100 / LTE	
632	07	Guinetel	Guinétel S.A.	Operational	GSM 900 / GSM 1800	

=== I ===
==== Ivory Coast – CI ====
MCC	MNC	Brand	Operator	Status	Bands (MHz)	References and notes
612	01		Cora de Comstar	Not operational	Unknown	
612	02	Moov	Atlantique Cellulaire	Operational	GSM 900 / GSM 1800 / UMTS 2100 / LTE 2600	
612	03	Orange	Orange	Operational	GSM 900 / UMTS 2100 / LTE 1800	
612	04	KoZ	Comium Ivory Coast Inc	Operational	GSM 900 / GSM 1800	
612	05	MTN	Loteny Telecom	Operational	GSM 900 / UMTS 2100 / LTE 800 / LTE 2600	
612	06	GreenN	Oricel	Operational	GSM 1800	
612	07	café	Aircomm	Operational	GSM 1800	
612	18		YooMee	Operational	TD-LTE 2300	

=== K ===
==== Kenya – KE ====
MCC	MNC	Brand	Operator	Status	Bands (MHz)	References and notes
639	01	Safaricom IoT	Safaricom Ltd	Operational	GSM 900 / GSM 1800 / NB-IoT / LTE 800 / 5G 3500	Second MNC for NB-IoT & private networks
639	02	Safaricom	Safaricom Limited	Operational	GSM 900 / GSM 1800 / UMTS 2100 / LTE 800 / LTE 1800 / 5G 2500	
639	03	Airtel	Bharti Airtel	Operational	GSM 900 / GSM 1800 / UMTS 900 / UMTS 2100 / LTE 800 / 5G 2500	Former Celtel, then Zain. Commercial 5G launch 7 Jul 2023
639	04		Mobile Pay Kenya Limited	Unknown	Unknown	
639	05	Airtel	Bharti Airtel	Unknown	Unknown	Former Econet Wireless, Essar Telecom; network sold to Safaricom in 2014, subscribers moved to Airtel
639	06		Finserve Africa Limited	Unknown	Unknown	
639	07	Telkom	Telkom Kenya	Operational	GSM 900 / GSM 1800 / UMTS 2100 / LTE 800	Former Orange Kenya; CDMA 850 MHz shut down in Mar 2015
639	08		Wetribe Ltd	Unknown	Unknown	Former Sema Mobile Services Ltd (MVNO)
639	09		Homeland Media Group Limited	Unknown	Unknown	
639	10	Faiba 4G	Jamii Telecommunications Limited	Operational	LTE 700	LTE band 28
639	11		Jambo Telcoms Limited	Unknown	Unknown	Former WiAfrica Kenya Ltd.
639	12		Infura Limited	Unknown	Unknown	
639	13		Hidiga Investments Ltd	Unknown	Unknown	
639	14		NRG Media Limited	Unknown	Unknown	

=== L ===
==== Lesotho – LS ====
MCC	MNC	Brand	Operator	Status	Bands (MHz)	References and notes
651	01	Vodacom	Vodacom Lesotho (Pty) Ltd	Operational	GSM 900 / UMTS 2100 / LTE 800 / LTE 1800 / 5G 3500	
651	02	Econet Telecom	Econet Ezi-cel	Operational	GSM 900 / UMTS 2100 / LTE	
651	10	Vodacom	Vodacom Lesotho (Pty) Ltd	Unknown	Unknown	

==== Liberia – LR ====
MCC	MNC	Brand	Operator	Status	Bands (MHz)	References and notes
618	01	Lonestar Cell MTN	Lonestar Communications Corporation	Operational	GSM 900 / GSM 1800 / UMTS 2100 / LTE	
618	02	Libercell	Atlantic Wireless (Liberia) Inc.	Not operational	Unknown	Shut down in 2012
618	04	Novafone	Novafone Inc.	Operational	GSM 900 / GSM 1800 / UMTS 2100	Former Comium
618	07	Orange LBR	Orange Liberia	Operational	GSM 900 / GSM 1800 / UMTS 2100 / LTE 1800	Former Cellcom
618	20	LIBTELCO	Liberia Telecommunications Corporation	Operational	CDMA2000	

==== Libya – LY ====
MCC	MNC	Brand	Operator	Status	Bands (MHz)	References and notes
606	00	Libyana	Libyana	Operational	GSM 900 / GSM 1800 / UMTS 2100 / LTE 1800	
606	01	Madar	Al-Madar Al-Jadeed	Operational	GSM 900 / GSM 1800 / UMTS 2100 / LTE 1800	
606	02	Al-Jeel Phone	Al-Jeel Al-Jadeed	Operational	MVNO	Uses Al-Madar
606	03	Libya Phone	Libya Telecom & Technology (LTT)	Operational	MVNO / LTE 800	Uses Libyana; LTE for fixed wireless broadband
606	06	Hatef Libya	Hatef Libya	Operational	CDMA2000	Fixed wireless

=== M ===
==== Madagascar – MG ====
MCC	MNC	Brand	Operator	Status	Bands (MHz)	References and notes
646	01	Airtel	Bharti Airtel	Operational	GSM 900 / GSM 1800 / UMTS 900 / UMTS 2100 / LTE 1800	Former Celtel (Zain), Madacom
646	02	Orange	Orange Madagascar S.A.	Operational	GSM 900 / UMTS 2100 / LTE 1800	
646	03	Sacel	Sacel Madagascar S.A.	Not operational	GSM 900	license withdrawn in 2001
646	04	Telma	Telma Mobile S.A.	Operational	GSM 900 / UMTS 2100 / LTE 1800 / 5G 3500	
646	05	BIP / blueline	Gulfsat Madagascar S.A.	Operational	LTE 2100 / TD-LTE 2600	

==== Malawi – MW ====
MCC	MNC	Brand	Operator	Status	Bands (MHz)	References and notes
650	01	TNM	Telecom Network Malawi	Operational	GSM 900 / GSM 1800 / UMTS 900 / UMTS 2100 / TD-LTE 2500 / 5G 3500 / 5G 3700	
650	02	Access	Access Communications Ltd	Operational	CDMA / LTE 850	
650	03	MTL	Malawi Telecommunications Limited	Operational	LTE 1800	
650	10	Airtel	Airtel Malawi Limited	Operational	GSM 900 / GSM 1800 / UMTS 900 / UMTS 2100 / LTE 1800	Former Celtel (Zain)

==== Mali – ML ====
MCC	MNC	Brand	Operator	Status	Bands (MHz)	References and notes
610	01	Malitel	Malitel SA	Operational	GSM 900 / UMTS 2100 / LTE	
610	02	Orange	Orange Mali SA	Operational	GSM 900 / UMTS 2100 / LTE	
610	03	Telecel	Alpha Telecommunication Mali S.A.	Operational	GSM 900 / GSM 1800 / UMTS 2100	

==== Mauritania – MR ====
MCC	MNC	Brand	Operator	Status	Bands (MHz)	References and notes
609	01	Mattel	Mattel	Operational	GSM 900 / LTE	
609	02	Chinguitel	Chinguitel	Operational	CDMA / GSM 900 / GSM 1800 / UMTS 2100 / LTE	
609	10	Moov	Mauritel Mobiles	Operational	GSM 900 / UMTS 2100 / LTE 1800	

==== Mauritius – MU ====
MCC	MNC	Brand	Operator	Status	Bands (MHz)	References and notes
617	01	my.t	Cellplus Mobile Communications Ltd.	Operational	GSM 900 / GSM 1800 / UMTS 2100 / LTE 1800 / 5G 3500	Former Orange
617	02	MOKOZE / AZU	Mahanagar Telephone Mauritius Limited (MTML)	Operational	CDMA2000	
617	03	CHILI	Mahanagar Telephone Mauritius Limited (MTML)	Operational	GSM 900 / UMTS 2100 / LTE 1800	
617	10	Emtel	Emtel Ltd.	Operational	GSM 900 / GSM 1800 / UMTS 2100 / LTE 1800 / 5G 2500	

==== Morocco – MA ====
MCC	MNC	Brand	Operator	Status	Bands (MHz)	References and notes
604	00	Orange Morocco	Médi Télécom	Operational	GSM 900 / GSM 1800 / UMTS 2100 / LTE 800 / LTE 1800 / LTE 2600 / 5G 700 / 5G 3500	Former Méditel
604	01	IAM	Ittissalat Al-Maghrib (Maroc Telecom)	Operational	GSM 900 / GSM 1800 / UMTS 2100 / LTE 800 / LTE 2600 / 5G 700 / 5G 3500	
604	02	INWI	Wana Corporate	Operational	GSM 900 / GSM 1800	
604	04		Al Houria Telecom	Unknown	Unknown	
604	05	INWI	Wana Corporate	Operational	GSM 900 / GSM 1800 / UMTS 2100 / LTE 800 / LTE 1800 / LTE 2600 / 5G 700 / 5G 3500	
604	06	IAM	Ittissalat Al-Maghrib (Maroc Telecom)	Unknown	Unknown	
604	99		Al Houria Telecom	Unknown	Unknown	

==== Mozambique – MZ ====
MCC	MNC	Brand	Operator	Status	Bands (MHz)	References and notes
643	01	tmCel	Moçambique Telecom S.A.	Operational	GSM 900 / GSM 1800 / UMTS 900 / UMTS 2100 / 5G	Former Mocambique Celular (mCel)
643	03	Movitel	Movitel, SA	Operational	GSM 900 / GSM 1800 / UMTS 2100 / LTE 800	
643	04	Vodacom	Vodacom Mozambique, S.A.	Operational	GSM 900 / GSM 1800 / UMTS 2100 / LTE 800 / LTE 1800 / 5G	

=== N ===
==== Namibia – NA ====
MCC	MNC	Brand	Operator	Status	Bands (MHz)	References and notes
649	01	MTC	MTC Namibia	Operational	GSM 900 / GSM 1800 / UMTS 2100 / LTE 1800	
649	02	switch	Telecom Namibia	Operational	CDMA2000 800	
649	03	TN Mobile	Telecom Namibia	Operational	GSM 900 / GSM 1800 / UMTS 2100 / LTE 1800 / TD-LTE 2600	former Cell One
649	04		Paratus Telecommunications (Pty)	Operational	WiMAX 2500 / TD-LTE	former ITN/WTN
649	05		Click Cloud Hosting Services CC	Unknown	Unknown	former Demshi Investments CC
649	06		MTN Namibia	Operational	LTE	LTE fixed wireless, MVNO
649	07		Loc Eight Mobile (Pty) Ltd	Unknown	Unknown	former Capricorn Connect

==== Niger – NE ====
MCC	MNC	Brand	Operator	Status	Bands (MHz)	References and notes
614	01	SahelCom	La Société Sahélienne de Télécommunications (SahelCom)	Operational	GSM 900	
614	02	Airtel	Bharti Airtel Limited	Operational	GSM 900 / LTE	formerly Zain, Celtel
614	03	Moov	Atlantique Telecom (subsidiary of Etisalat)	Operational	GSM 900	Former Telecel
614	04	Orange	Orange Niger	Operational	GSM 900 / GSM 1800	

==== Nigeria – NG ====
MCC	MNC	Brand	Operator	Status	Bands (MHz)	References and notes
621	00		Capcom	Not operational	LTE 1900	Former Starcomms, MultiLinks, and MTS First Wireless
621	20	Airtel	Bharti Airtel Limited	Operational	GSM 900 / GSM 1800 / UMTS 2100 / LTE 1800 / 5G 3500	Former Zain, V-Mobile
621	22	InterC	InterC Network Ltd.	Operational	LTE 800	Former Intercellular; LTE band 20
621	24		Spectranet	Operational	TD-LTE 2300	
621	25	Visafone	Visafone Communications Ltd.	Not operational	CDMA2000 800 / CDMA2000 1900	Acquired by MTN
621	26		Swift	Operational	TD-LTE 2300	
621	27	Smile	Smile Communications Nigeria	Operational	LTE 800	LTE band 20
621	28	MCom (Mafab)	Mafab Communications Ltd.	Operational	5G 3500	Limited FWA launch 24 Jan 2023
621	30	MTN	MTN Nigeria Communications Limited	Operational	GSM 900 / GSM 1800 / UMTS 2100 / LTE 800 / LTE 2600 / TD-LTE 3500 / 5G 3500	
621	40	Ntel	Nigerian Mobile Telecommunications Limited	Operational	LTE 900 / LTE 1800	Former M-Tel; LTE bands 8 / 3
621	50	Glo	Globacom Ltd	Operational	GSM 900 / GSM 1800 / UMTS 2100 / LTE 700 / LTE 2600	LTE bands 28, 7
621	60	9mobile	Emerging Markets Telecommunication Services Ltd.	Operational	GSM 900 / GSM 1800 / UMTS 2100 / LTE 1800	Until 2017, Etisalat

=== R ===
==== Rwanda – RW ====
MCC	MNC	Brand	Operator	Status	Bands (MHz)	References and notes
635	10	MTN Rwanda	MTN Rwandacell SARL	Operational	GSM 900 / GSM 1800 / UMTS 900 / UMTS 2100 / LTE / 5G 3500	MTN Rwanda has officially launched 5G live 15 Apr 2025 in various cities including Gasabo, Nyarugenge, Kicukiro, and Kamonyi Districts
635	11		Liquid Telecom	Not operational	CDMA	Former Rwandatel
635	12		Liquid Telecom	Not operational	GSM	Former Rwandatel
635	13	Airtel	Airtel RWANDA	Operational	GSM 900 / GSM 1800 / UMTS 2100 / LTE	Former Tigo
635	14	Airtel	Airtel RWANDA	Not operational	GSM 900 / GSM 1800 / UMTS 2100	Merged with Tigo; MNC withdrawn
635	17	KTRN	KT Rwanda Networks	Operational	LTE 800 / LTE 1800	Former Olleh; wholesale network used by Airtel, MTN, Tigo

=== S ===
==== Saint Helena, Ascension and Tristan da Cunha – SH ====
MCC	MNC	Brand	Operator	Status	Bands (MHz)	References and notes
658	01	Sure	Sure South Atlantic Ltd.	Operational	GSM 900 / GSM 1800 / LTE 1800	

==== São Tomé and Príncipe – ST ====
MCC	MNC	Brand	Operator	Status	Bands (MHz)	References and notes
626	01	CSTmovel	Companhia Santomense de Telecomunicações	Operational	GSM 900 / UMTS 2100 / LTE	
626	02	Unitel STP	Unitel São Tomé and Príncipe	Operational	GSM 900 / UMTS 2100 / LTE	

==== Senegal – SN ====
MCC	MNC	Brand	Operator	Status	Bands (MHz)	References and notes
608	01	Orange	Sonatel	Operational	GSM 900 / UMTS 2100 / LTE 800 / LTE 1800	
608	02	Free	Saga Africa Holdings Limited	Operational	GSM 900 / GSM 1800 / UMTS 900 / UMTS 2100 / LTE 800 / LTE 1800	Former Hello, Tigo
608	03	Expresso	Expresso Telecom	Operational	GSM 900 / GSM 1800 / UMTS 2100 / LTE	
608	04		CSU-SA	Unknown	Unknown	

==== Seychelles – SC ====
MCC	MNC	Brand	Operator	Status	Bands (MHz)	References and notes
633	01	Cable & Wireless	Cable & Wireless Seychelles	Operational	GSM 900 / UMTS / 5G	
633	02	Mediatech	Mediatech International	Not operational	GSM 1800	License and MNC withdrawn
633	05		Intelvision Ltd	Unknown	Unknown	
633	09	Airtel	Airtel (Seychelles) Ltd	Unknown	Unknown	
633	10	Airtel	Telecom Seychelles Ltd	Operational	GSM 900 / UMTS 2100 / LTE 800	

==== Sierra Leone – SL ====
MCC	MNC	Brand	Operator	Status	Bands (MHz)	References and notes
619	01	Orange	Orange SL Limited	Operational	GSM 900 / UMTS 2100 / LTE	Former Zain, Celtel, Bharti Airtel
619	02	Africell	Lintel Sierra Leone Limited	Unknown	Unknown	Former Millicom, Tigo
619	03	Africell	Lintel Sierra Leone Limited	Operational	GSM 900	
619	04	Comium	Comium (Sierra Leone) Ltd.	Not operational	GSM 900 / GSM 1800	
619	05	Africell	Lintel Sierra Leone Limited	Operational	GSM 900 / UMTS 900	
619	06	SierraTel	Sierra Leone Telephony	Operational	CDMA 800 / LTE	
619	07		Qcell Sierra Leone	Unknown	Unknown	
619	09	Smart Mobile	InterGroup Telecom SL	Operational	GSM 900 / GSM 1800 / UMTS 2100	
619	25	Mobitel	Mobitel	Reserved	Unknown	
619	40		Datatel (SL) Ltd.	Unknown	GSM	
619	50		Datatel (SL) Ltd.	Unknown	CDMA	

==== Somalia – SO ====
MCC	MNC	Brand	Operator	Status	Bands (MHz)	References and notes
637	01	Telesom	Telesom	Operational	GSM 900 / GSM 1800 / UMTS 2100 / LTE / 5G	
637	04	Somafone	Somafone FZLLC	Operational	GSM 900 / GSM 1800	
637	10	Nationlink	NationLink Telecom	Operational	GSM 900	
637	20	SOMNET	SOMNET	Operational	GSM 900 / GSM 1800 / UMTS 2100 / LTE 800	Uncertain bands
637	50	Hormuud	Hormuud Telecom Somalia Inc	Operational	GSM 900 / UMTS / 5G	Uncertain MNC number, maybe (also) 25
637	30	Golis	Golis Telecom Somalia	Operational	GSM 900	
637	57	UNITEL	UNITEL S.a.r.l.	Operational	GSM 900 / GSM 1800	
637	60	Nationlink	Nationlink Telecom	Operational	GSM 900 / GSM 1800	
637	67	Horntel Group	HTG Group Somalia	Operational	GSM 900 / GSM 1800 / UMTS 2100	
637	70		Onkod Telecom Ltd.	Not operational	Unknown	MNC withdrawn
637	71	Somtel	Somtel	Operational	GSM 900 / GSM 1800 / UMTS 2100 / LTE 800 / 5G	
637	82	Telcom	Telcom Somalia	Operational	GSM 900 / GSM 1800 / CDMA2000 / LTE	

==== South Africa – ZA ====
MCC	MNC	Brand	Operator	Status	Bands (MHz)	References and notes
655	01	Vodacom	Vodacom	Operational	GSM 900 / GSM 1800 / UMTS 2100 / LTE 900 / LTE 1800 / LTE 2100 / LTE 5200 / LTE 5800 / 5G 700 / 5G 3500	
655	02	Telkom	Telkom SA SOC Ltd	Operational	GSM 1800 / UMTS 2100 / LTE 1800 / TD-LTE 2300 / 5G 3500	Formerly Telkom Mobile, 8ta
655	03	Telkom	Telkom SA SOC Ltd	Unknown	Unknown	
655	04		Sasol (Pty) Ltd.	Not operational	Unknown	
655	05		Telkom SA Ltd	Unknown	Unknown 3G	
655	06		Sentech (Pty) Ltd	Operational	Unknown	
655	07	Cell C	Cell C (Pty) Ltd	Operational	GSM 900 / GSM 1800 / UMTS 900 / LTE 1800 / LTE 2100	
655	08	Cell C	Cell C (Pty) Ltd	Unknown	Unknown	
655	09	Cell C	Cell C (Pty) Ltd	Unknown	Unknown	
655	10	MTN	MTN Group	Operational	GSM 900 / UMTS 900 / UMTS 2100 / LTE 900 / LTE 1800 / LTE 2100 / 5G 700 / 5G 1800 / 5G 2100 / 5G 3500 / 5G 28000	
655	11	MTN	MTN Group	Unknown	Unknown	Former South African Police Service Gauteng
655	12	MTN	MTN Group	Unknown	Unknown	
655	13	Neotel	Neotel Pty Ltd	Not operational	CDMA 800	Shut down May 2019
655	14	Neotel	Neotel Pty Ltd	Operational	LTE 1800	
655	16		Phoenix System Integration (Pty) Ltd	Not operational	Unknown	MNC withdrawn
655	17		Sishen Iron Ore Company (Ltd) Pty	Not operational	Unknown	
655	18	MTN	MTN Group	Unknown	Unknown	
655	19	rain	Wireless Business Solutions (Pty) Ltd	Operational	LTE 1800 / TD-LTE 2600 / TD-5G 2600	
655	20	Vodacom	Vodacom Pty Ltd	Unknown	Unknown	
655	21		Cape Town Metropolitan Council	Not operational	TETRA 410	
655	24		SMSPortal (Pty) Ltd.	Unknown	Unknown	
655	25		Wirels Connect	Unknown	Unknown	
655	27		A to Z Vaal Industrial Supplies Pty Ltd	Unknown	Unknown	
655	28		Hymax Talking Solutions (Pty) Ltd	Unknown	Unknown	
655	30		Bokamoso Consortium	Operational	Unknown	
655	31		Karabo Telecoms (Pty) Ltd.	Operational	Unknown	
655	32		Ilizwi Telecommunications	Operational	Unknown	
655	33		Thinta Thinta Telecommunications Pty Ltd	Operational	Unknown	
655	34		Bokone Telecoms Pty Ltd	Unknown	Unknown	
655	35		Kingdom Communications Pty Ltd	Unknown	Unknown	
655	36		Amatole Telecommunications Pty Ltd	Unknown	Unknown	
655	38	rain	Wireless Business Solutions (Pty) Ltd	Unknown	Unknown	Former iBurst
655	41		South African Police Service	Not operational	Unknown	
655	46		SMS Cellular Services (Pty) Ltd	Operational	MVNO	
655	50		Ericsson South Africa (Pty) Ltd	Unknown	Unknown	
655	51		Integrat (Pty) Ltd	Unknown	Unknown	
655	53	Lycamobile	Lycamobile (Pty) Ltd	Unknown	MVNO	
655	65		Vodacom Pty Ltd	Unknown	Unknown	
655	73	rain	Wireless Business Solutions (Pty) Ltd	Unknown	Unknown	Former iBurst
655	74	rain	Wireless Business Solutions (Pty) Ltd	Unknown	Unknown	Former iBurst
655	75	ACSA	Airports Company South Africa	Not operational	Unknown	
655	76		Comsol Networks (Pty) Ltd	Operational	WiMAX / 28000	
655	77	Umoja Connect	One Telecom (Pty) Ltd	Unknown	5G	

==== South Sudan – SS ====
MCC	MNC	Brand	Operator	Status	Bands (MHz)	References and notes
659	02	MTN	MTN South Sudan	Operational	GSM 900 / GSM 1800 / UMTS 2100 / LTE	
659	03	Gemtel	Gemtel	Not operational	GSM 900 / GSM 1800	
659	04	Vivacell	Network of the World (NOW)	Not operational	GSM 900 / GSM 1800	shut down Mar 2018
659	05	DIGITEL	DIGITEL Holdings Ltd.	Operational	GSM 900 / GSM 1800 / UMTS 2100 / LTE 800 / LTE 1800	
659	06	Zain	Zain South Sudan	Operational	GSM 900 / GSM 1800 / UMTS 2100 / LTE 2100	
659	07	Sudani	Sudani	Not operational	CDMA	

==== Sudan – SD ====
MCC	MNC	Brand	Operator	Status	Bands (MHz)	References and notes
634	01	Zain SD	Zain Group - Sudan	Operational	GSM 900 / UMTS 2100 / LTE 1800	Former, Mobitel
634	02	MTN	MTN Sudan	Operational	GSM 900 / GSM 1800 / UMTS 2100	
634	03	MTN	MTN Sudan	Unknown	Unknown	
634	05	NOW	Network of the World Ltd	Not operational	CDMA 450	Former Canar Telecom; MNC withdrawn
634	07	Sudani One	Sudatel Group	Operational	GSM 1800 / UMTS 2100 / LTE 1800 / CDMA 800	
634	09	khartoum INC	NEC	Operational	GSM 900 / GSM 1800 / UMTS 2100	

=== T ===
==== Tanzania – TZ ====
MCC	MNC	Brand	Operator	Status	Bands (MHz)	References and notes
640	01		Shared Network Tanzania Limited	Not operational	UMTS 900	Former Rural NetCo Limited; MNC withdrawn
640	02	tiGO	MIC Tanzania Limited	Operational	GSM 900 / GSM 1800 / UMTS 900 / UMTS 2100 / LTE 800 / LTE 1800 / 5G 2500	Former Mobitel, Buzz
640	03	Zantel	MIC Tanzania Limited	Operational	GSM 900 / GSM 1800 / UMTS 2100 / LTE 1800	Former Zanzibar Telecom
640	04	Vodacom	Vodacom Tanzania Limited	Operational	GSM 900 / GSM 1800 / UMTS 2100 / LTE 1800 / 5G 700 / 5G 2300	
640	05	Airtel	Bharti Airtel	Operational	GSM 900 / GSM 1800 / UMTS 900 / UMTS 2100 / LTE 700 / LTE 2100 / 5G	Former Celtel (Zain); LTE bands 28 / 1
640	06		WIA Company Limited	Operational	WiMAX / LTE	Former Sasatel (Dovetel); fixed wireless
640	07	TTCL Mobile	Tanzania Telecommunication Company LTD (TTCL)	Operational	CDMA 800 / UMTS 2100 / LTE 1800 / TD-LTE 2300	
640	08	extel	Telxer Enterprise Limited	Unknown	GSM	Former Smart, Benson Informatics
640	09	Halotel	Viettel Tanzania Limited	Operational	GSM 900 / GSM 1800 / UMTS 2100	Former ExcellentCom Tanzania Limited (Hits)
640	11	Smile	Smile Telecoms Holdings Ltd.	Operational	LTE 800	
640	12		MyCell Limited	Not operational	Unknown	MNC withdrawn
640	13	Cootel	Wiafrica Tanzania Limited	Not operational	Unknown	MNC withdrawn
640	14		MO Mobile Holding Limited	Not operational	Unknown	MNC withdrawn

==== Togo – TG ====
MCC	MNC	Brand	Operator	Status	Bands (MHz)	References and notes
615	01	Togo Cell	Togo Telecom	Operational	GSM 900 / LTE / 5G	
615	03	Moov	Moov Togo	Operational	GSM 900 / LTE	

==== Tunisia – TN ====
MCC	MNC	Brand	Operator	Status	Bands (MHz)	References and notes
605	01	Orange	Orange Tunisie	Operational	GSM 900 / GSM 1800 / UMTS 2100 / LTE 800 / LTE 1800	
605	02	Tunicell	Tunisie Telecom	Operational	GSM 900 / GSM 1800 / UMTS 2100 / LTE 800 / LTE 1800	
605	03	Ooredoo	Ooredoo Tunisiana	Operational	GSM 900 / GSM 1800 / UMTS 900 / UMTS 2100 / LTE 800 / LTE 1800	former Orascom Telecom Tunisie

=== U ===
==== Uganda – UG ====
MCC	MNC	Brand	Operator	Status	Bands (MHz)	References and notes
641	01	Airtel	Bharti Airtel	Operational	GSM 900 / UMTS 2100 / 5G	Former Zain, Celtel
641	04		Tangerine Uganda Limited	Operational	LTE	
641	05		Roke Telkom (Uganda) Limited	Unknown	Unknown	
641	06		Savanna Fibre Limited	Unknown	Unknown	Former Vodafone, Afrimax Uganda until 2018
641	07		Blue Crane Communications (U) Limited	Unknown	Unknown	
641	08		Talkio Mobile Limited	Unknown	MVNO	
641	10	MTN	MTN Uganda	Operational	GSM 900 / UMTS 900 / UMTS 2100 / LTE 2600 / 5G	LTE band 7
641	11	Uganda Telecom	Uganda Telecom Ltd.	Operational	GSM 900 / UMTS 2100	
641	14	Africell	Africell Uganda	Not operational	GSM 900 / GSM 1800 / UMTS / LTE 800	Ceased operations 7 Oct 2021
641	16		SimbaNET Uganda Limited	Unknown	Unknown	
641	18	Smart	Suretelecom Uganda Ltd.	Not operational	GSM 900 / GSM 1800 / UMTS 2100	MNC withdrawn
641	20		Hamilton Telecom Limited	Unknown	MVNO	
641	22	Airtel	Bharti Airtel	Operational	GSM 900 / GSM 1800 / UMTS	Former Warid Telecom
641	26	Lycamobile	Lycamobile Network Services Uganda Limited	Not operational	MVNO	MNC withdrawn
641	30		Anupam Global Soft Uganda Limited	Not operational	Unknown	MNC withdrawn
641	33	Smile	Smile Communications Uganda Ltd.	Not operational	LTE 800	Shut down 2023; MNC withdrawn
641	40		Civil Aviation Authority (CAA)	Unknown	Unknown	
641	44	K2	K2 Telecom Ltd	Operational	MVNO	
641	66	i-Tel	i-Tel Ltd	Not operational	Unknown	MNC withdrawn

=== Z ===
==== Zambia – ZM ====
MCC	MNC	Brand	Operator	Status	Bands (MHz)	References and notes
645	01	Airtel	Bharti Airtel	Operational	GSM 900 / UMTS 900 / UMTS 2100 / LTE 900 / 5G 2600	Former Celtel (Zain)
645	02	MTN	MTN Group	Operational	GSM 900 / UMTS 2100 / LTE 1800 / 5G 2600	Former Telecel
645	03	ZAMTEL	Zambia Telecommunications Company Ltd	Operational	GSM 900 / UMTS 2100 / TD-LTE 2300	
645	04	Zedmobile	Beeline Telecoms Limited	Unknown	LTE	
645	07		Liquid Telecom Zambia Limited	Unknown	Unknown	

==== Zimbabwe – ZW ====
MCC	MNC	Brand	Operator	Status	Bands (MHz)	References and notes
648	01	Net*One	Net*One Cellular (Pvt) Ltd	Operational	GSM 900 / LTE 1800	
648	03	Telecel	Telecel Zimbabwe (PVT) Ltd	Operational	GSM 900 / LTE 1800	LTE launched Jul 2024
648	04	Econet	Econet Wireless	Operational	GSM 900 / GSM 1800 / UMTS 2100 / LTE 1800 / 5G	

== See also ==
- List of mobile network operators of the Middle East and Africa
- List of LTE networks in Africa
