= List of LTE networks in Africa =

This is a list of commercial Long-Term Evolution (LTE) networks in Africa, grouped by their frequency bands.

Some operators use multiple bands and are therefore listed multiple times in respective sections.

== General information ==
- For technical details on LTE and a list of its designated operating frequencies, bands, and roaming possibilities, see LTE frequency bands.
- Bands 33 to 44 are assigned to TDD-LTE.

Note: This list of network deployments does not imply any widespread deployment or national coverage.

== Commercial deployments ==
Country	Operator	ƒ (MHz)	B	VoLTE	Launch date Cat.3 ≤ 100 Mbit/s	Launch date Cat.4 ≤ 150 Mbit/s	Launch date Cat.6 ≤ 300 Mbit/s	Launch date Cat.9 ≤ 450 Mbit/s	Launch date Cat.11 ≤ 600 Mbit/s	Notes
Algeria	Algérie Télécom (Mobilis)	1800	3	Sep 2016	Sep 2016					10 MHz
Algeria	Algérie Télécom	?	?		May 2014					FWB (Note: Fixed Wireless Broadband)
Algeria	Ooredoo	1800	3		Sep 2016					10 MHz; Pre-commercial service as of Jul 2016.
Algeria	Optimum Telecom (Djezzy)	1800	3		Sep 2016					10 MHz
Angola	Africel	?	?		Apr 2022					
Angola	Movicel	1800	3		Apr 2012					10 or 20 MHz in use
Angola	Net One	2500	41		Aug 2014					20 MHz
Angola	Unitel	1800	3		Dec 2012					20 MHz
Ascension Island	Sure	1800	3		Sep 2015					
Benin	be.Telecoms	1800	3		Dec 2015					
Benin	MTN	1800	3		Nov 2016					
Botswana	BTC	1800	3		Apr 2017					5 MHz in use 2,5 MHz remain for GSM services.
Botswana	Mascom	1800	3		Feb 2015					10 MHz
Botswana	Orange	1800	3		Feb 2015		Jun 2020			10 MHz; CA (Note: Carrier Aggregation) of 25 MHz (CA_1A_3A).
Botswana	Orange	2100	1		Jun 2020		Jun 2020			15 MHz in use CA of 25 MHz (CA_1A_3A). 10 MHz remain for UMTS services.
Botswana	Orange	?	?		Jun 2021					
Burkina Faso	Onatel	1800	3		Mar 2019					15 MHz in use
Burkina Faso	Orange	1800	3		Jan 2019					15 MHz in use
Burkina Faso	Telecel	1800	3		Dec 2020					15 MHz in use
Burundi	Econet Leo	1800	3		Mar 2017					15 MHz in use
Burundi	Viettel (Lumitel)	1800	3		Feb 2016					15 MHz in use
Cameroon	MTN	2500	41		Dec 2015					
Cameroon	Orange	1800	3		Apr 2016					10 MHz in use
Cape Verde	CVMóvel	800	20		Sep 2019					
Chad	Airtel	1800 ?	3 ?		Oct 2018					
Chad	Tigo	2600	7		Sep 2014					
Comoros	Telma	800	20		Dec 2016					Subsidiary of Telecom Malagasy (Telma).
Congo	MTN	2600	7		Dec 2016					20 MHz
Congo	Airtel	2600 ?	7 ?		Dec 2018					
Democratic Republic of Congo	Orange	2600	38		May 2018					
Democratic Republic of Congo	Airtel	1800 ?	3 ?		Dec 2021 ?					
Democratic Republic of Congo	Vodacom	3500	42		May 2018					
Djibouti	Djibouti Telecom	800	?		May 2018					
Djibouti	Djibouti Telecom	1800	3		May 2018					
Egypt	Etisalat	1800	3	Sep 2018	Sep 2017					10 MHz in use 10 MHz remain for GSM services.
Egypt	Orange	1800	3		Sep 2017					10 MHz in use 5 MHz remain for GSM services.
Egypt	Vodafone Egypt	1800	3		Sep 2017					10 MHz
Egypt	Telecom Egypt (WE)	1800	3		Sep 2017					5 MHz
Equatorial Guinea	Getesa	?	?		Jan 2021					
Equatorial Guinea	GreenCom (Muni)	?	?		Jun 2019					
Eswatini	MTN	1800	3		Jul 2016 ?					20 MHz
Eswatini	Eswatini Mobile	1800	3		Apr 2017					10 MHz
Ethiopia	Ethiotelecom	1800	3		Mar 2015		Feb 2020			20 MHz
Gabon	Airtel	2100	1		Dec 2015					10 MHz
Gabon	Gabon Telecom	800	20	Oct 2015 ?	Oct 2014 ?		Nov 2015 ?			10 MHz
Gabon	Gabon Telecom	1800	3	Oct 2015 ?	Oct 2014 ?		Nov 2015 ?			10 MHz
Gabon	Gabon Telecom	2600	7	Oct 2015 ?	Oct 2014 ?		Nov 2015 ?			10 MHz
Gambia	Africell	1800	3		Jan 2018					10 MHz
Gambia	Netpage	2300	40		Apr 2015					10 MHz FWB
Gambia	QCell	1800	3		May 2017					
Ghana	Blu Telecom	2500	41		Oct 2014					20 MHz; 10 MHz remain unused. Available in Accra and Tema.
Ghana	BusyInternet	2300	40		Jan 2016					20 MHz; 10 MHz remain unused.
Ghana	MTN	800	20		Jun 2016	Mar 2019 (via CA)				15 MHz; CA of 30 MHz (CA_7A_20A).
Ghana	MTN	2600	7		Mar 2019	Mar 2019 (via CA)				15 MHz; CA of 30 MHz (CA_7A_20A).
Ghana	Telesol	1800	3		Dec 2018					
Ghana	Vodafone	800	20		Mar 2019		Sep 2023			15 MHz
Ghana	Vodafone	1800	3		Sep 2023		Sep 2023			10 MHz
Guinea	Orange	1800 ?	3 ?		Apr 2019					
Guinea Bissau	Orange	1800 ?	3 ?		Dec 2015					
Ivory Coast	Moov	2600	7		?					
Ivory Coast	MTN	800	20		Jul 2016 ?					10 MHz
Ivory Coast	MTN	2600	7		Dec 2020	Dec 2020				20 MHz; 256 QAM
Ivory Coast	Orange	1800	3		Jan 2016					
Ivory Coast	YooMee	2300	40		Apr 2014					
Kenya	Airtel	800	20	May 2023	May 2018					10 MHz
Kenya	Faiba 4G	700	28	Dec 2017	Dec 2017					10 MHz
Kenya	Safaricom	800	20	Jun 2019	Dec 2014	Jun 2017 (via CA)				10 MHz
Kenya	Safaricom	1800	3	Jun 2019	Dec 2014	Jun 2017 (via CA)				10 MHz in use
Kenya	Telkom Kenya	800	20		Jun 2017					10 MHz
Lesotho	Vodacom	800	20		Oct 2014					15 MHz
Lesotho	Vodacom	1800	3		?					20 MHz
Liberia	Lonestar Cell-MTN	?	?		?					
Liberia	Orange	1800	3		Apr 2016	Apr 2016				20 MHz
Libya	Almadar Aljaded	1800	3		Oct 2018					20 MHz
Libya	Libyana	1800 ?	3 ?		Mar 2017	Mar 2017				20 MHz
Libya	LTT	800	20		Mar 2018					10 MHz FWB
Madagascar	Airtel	1800 ?	3 ?		Nov 2017					
Madagascar	BIP	2100	1		Jun 2016					Owned by Gulfsat
Madagascar	Blueline	2500	41		Dec 2014					Owned by Gulfsat
Madagascar	Orange	1800	3		Mar 2017					
Madagascar	Telma	1800	3		Jun 2015	Mar 2020 ?				
Malawi	Access Comm	850	5		Apr 2015					
Malawi	Airtel	1800	3		Jan 2018					
Malawi	TNM	2500	41	Jun 2016	Jun 2016	Jun 2017				
Mali	Orange	1800 ?	3 ?		Mar 2018 ?					
Mali	Malitel	1800 ?	3 ?		Nov 2018					
Mauritania	Chinguitel	?	?		Sep 2021					
Mauritania	Mattel	?	?		Jan 2021					
Mauritania	Moov Mauritel	1800	3		Dec 2020					
Mauritius	Emtel	1800	3		May 2012					20 MHz
Mauritius	MTML	1800	3		May 2015					
Mauritius	my.t	1800	3		Jun 2012					20 MHz
Mayotte	Maore Mobile	1800	3		Apr 2019					15 MHz in use 5 MHz remain for GSM services.
Mayotte	Orange	1800	3		Dec 2016	Dec 2016				20 MHz
Mayotte	SFR	800	20		Dec 2016	N/A	Dec 2016			10 MHz; CA of 40 MHz (CA_3A_7A_20A).
Mayotte	SFR	1800	3		Dec 2016	N/A	Dec 2016			10 MHz in use CA of 40 MHz (CA_3A_7A_20A). 5 MHz remain for GSM services.
Mayotte	SFR	2600	7		Dec 2016	Dec 2016	Dec 2016			20 MHz; CA of 40 MHz (CA_3A_7A_20A).
Morocco	Inwi	800	20		?					10 MHz
Morocco	Inwi	1800	3		June 2015					20 MHz in use 5 MHz remain for GSM services.
Morocco	Inwi	2600	7		?					20 MHz
Morocco	Maroc Telecom	800	20		Jul 2015	—N/a	Jul 2015			10 MHz; CA of 30 MHz (CA_7A_20A).
Morocco	Maroc Telecom	2600	7		Jul 2015	Jul 2015	Jul 2015			20 MHz; CA of 30 MHz (CA_7A_20A).
Morocco	Orange	800	20		Jun 2015	—N/a	Feb 2018	Feb 2018		10 MHz; 4x4 MIMO; CA of 30 MHz (CA_3A_20A).
Morocco	Orange	1800	3		Jun 2015	Jun 2015	Feb 2018	Feb 2018		20 MHz; 4x4 MIMO; CA of 30 MHz (CA_3A_20A).
Morocco	Orange	2600	7		?					20 MHz
Mozambique	Movitel, SA	800	20		Jul 2019					10 MHz
Mozambique	Vodacom	800	20	Aug 2022	Oct 2018					10 MHz
Mozambique	Vodacom	1800	3	Aug 2022	Mar 2019					10 MHz
Namibia	MTC	800	20		Apr 2016					
Namibia	MTC	1800	3		May 2012					20 MHz in use 15 MHz remain for GSM services.
Namibia	MTN	?	?		Nov 2019					FWB
Namibia	Paratus	?	?		Aug 2019					
Namibia	TN Mobile	1800	3		Nov 2013					20 MHz
Namibia	TN Mobile	2600	38		Mar 2017					20 MHz in use 2 MHz remain unused.
Niger	Airtel	?	?		Jul 2019					
Nigeria	9mobile	1800	3		Oct 2016					10 MHz in use 5 MHz remain for GSM services.
Nigeria	Airtel	1800	3	Apr 2023	Feb 2018					10 MHz in use 5 MHz remain for GSM services.
Nigeria	Bitflux	2300	40		Aug 2016	Aug 2016	Jun 2019			30 MHz; CA of 30 MHz (CA_40C). Wholesale network, used by VDT.
Nigeria	Cyberspace	3500	42		Aug 2015					
Nigeria	Glo Mobile	700	28		Oct 2016		Jun 2023			CA of 20 MHz (CA_7A_28A).
Nigeria	Glo Mobile	2600	7		Jun 2023		Jun 2023			10 MHz; CA of 20 MHz (CA_7A_28A).
Nigeria	InterC Network	800	20		Aug 2016					5 MHz
Nigeria	MTN	800	20	Apr 2022	Oct 2016	Jun 2019 (via CA)	Jun 2019			15 MHz; CA of 30 MHz (CA_7A_20A).
Nigeria	MTN	2600	7	Apr 2022	Oct 2016	Jun 2019 (via CA)	Jun 2019			15 MHz in use CA of 30 MHz (CA_7A_20A).
Nigeria	MTN (HyNet)	3500	42		Jul 2015					20 MHz in use
Nigeria	ntel	900	8	Apr 2016	Apr 2016	Apr 2016 (via CA)	Apr 2016			5 MHz; 4x4 MIMO; CA of 20 MHz (CA_3A_8A).
Nigeria	ntel	1800	3	Apr 2016	Apr 2016	Apr 2016 (via CA)	Apr 2016			15 MHz; 4x4 MIMO; CA of 20 MHz (CA_3A_8A).
Nigeria	Smile	800	20	Mar 2016	Feb 2013					10 MHz
Nigeria	Spectranet	2300	40		Aug 2013					20 MHz
Nigeria	SWIFT	2300	40		Nov 2013					20 MHz
Nigeria	Tizeti	?	?		Nov 2019					
Réunion	Free	800	20		?	?				10 MHz
Réunion	Free	1800	3		Jul 2017	Jul 2017				20 MHz
Réunion	Orange	1800	3		Dec 2016	Dec 2016				20 MHz
Réunion	SFR	800	20		Dec 2016	N/A	Dec 2016			10 MHz; CA of 40 MHz (CA_3A_7A_20A).
Réunion	SFR	1800	3		Dec 2016	N/A	Dec 2016			10 MHz in use CA of 40 MHz (CA_3A_7A_20A). 5 MHz remain for GSM services.
Réunion	SFR	2600	7		Dec 2016	Dec 2016	Dec 2016			20 MHz; CA of 40 MHz (CA_3A_7A_20A).
Réunion	Zeop	1800	3		May 2018					
Réunion	Zeop	2100	1		May 2018					
Réunion	Zeop	2600	7		May 2018					
Rwanda	Airtel	?	?		Jul 2023					
Rwanda	MTN	?	?		Jul 2023					
Rwanda	ORN	800	20		Nov 2014	Nov 2014				20 MHz
Saint Helena	Sure	1800	3		Sep 2015					
Sao Tome and Principe	CST	?	?		Aug 2023					20 MHz
Sao Tome and Principe	Unitel	?	?		Apr 2023					
Senegal	Expresso	?	?		Mar 2021					
Senegal	Free	?	?		Oct 2019					
Senegal	Orange	800 ?	20 ?		Dec 2016 ?		Sep 2018 ?			
Senegal	Orange	1800 ?	3 ?		Dec 2016 ?		Sep 2018 ?			
Seychelles	Airtel	800	20		Nov 2014					
Sierra Leone	Orange	?	?		Apr 2019					
Sierra Leone	Sierratel	?	?		Jan 2018					
Somalia	Globalsom	?	?		?					Available in Mogadishu.
Somalia	Sahal Telecom	800	20		?					Available in Mogadishu.
Somalia	Somnet Telecom	?	?		?					Available in Mogadishu.
Somaliland	Somcable	700	?		Jan 2016					FWB
Somaliland	Somtel	800 ?	20 ?		May 2014	Mar 2019				
Somaliland	Telesom	?	?		?					
South Africa	Cell C	1800	3		Apr 2016	Apr 2016 (via CA)				10 MHz in use CA of 15 MHz (CA_1A_3A). 2 MHz remain for GSM services.
South Africa	Cell C	2100	1		Sep 2015	Apr 2016 (via CA)				5 MHz in use CA of 15 MHz (CA_1A_3A). 10 MHz remain for UMTS services.
South Africa	MTN	900	8	Sep 2018	May 2018					5 MHz in use 6 MHz remain for UMTS/GSM services.
South Africa	MTN	2100	1	Sep 2018	Mar 2016					5 MHz in use 10 MHz remain for UMTS services. CA of 15 MHz with 40 MHz LTE-U (trial).
South Africa	MTN (Afrihost)	1800	3	Sep 2018	Dec 2012					10 MHz in use FWB; 2 MHz remain for GSM services.
South Africa	Neotel	1800	3		Aug 2013					10 MHz in use FWB; 2 MHz remain unused.
South Africa	Rain Mobile	1800	3		Apr 2023					10 MHz
South Africa	Rain Mobile	2600	38		Jun 2018					20 MHz
South Africa	Telkom / 8ta	1800	3	Nov 2018	Jun 2016					5-10 MHz in use 7-2 MHz remain for GSM services. CA of 25 or 30 MHz; 4x4 MIMO, 265 QAM (Demo).
South Africa	Telkom / 8ta	2300	40		Apr 2013	Dec 2014				20 MHz in use CA of 25 or 30 MHz; 4x4 MIMO, 265 QAM (Demo). Massive-MIMO (Demo).
South Africa	Vodacom	900	8	Mar 2016	Mar 2016		Mar 2016	Mar 2016	Aug 2017	5 MHz in use 4x4 MIMO, 256 QAM; CA of 25 MHz (CA_1A_3A_8A). 6 MHz remain for GSM services.
South Africa	Vodacom	1800	3	Apr 2015	Oct 2012		Mar 2016	Mar 2016	Aug 2017	10 MHz in use 4x4 MIMO, 256 QAM; CA of 25 MHz (CA_1A_3A_8A). CA of 50 MHz (CA_3A_47C). CA of 70 MHz (CA_3A_46C_46A). 2 MHz remain for GSM services.
South Africa	Vodacom	2100	1	Mar 2016	Mar 2016		Mar 2016	Mar 2016	Aug 2017	10 MHz in use 4x4 MIMO, 256 QAM; CA of 25 MHz (CA_1A_3A_8A). 5 MHz remain for UMTS services.
South Africa	Vodacom	5200	46	Sep 2017	Sep 2017	Sep 2017	Sep 2017	Sep 2017	Sep 2017	60 MHz in use 4x4 MIMO, 256 QAM, LTE-LAA; CA of 70 MHz (CA_3A_46C_46A).
South Africa	Vodacom	5800	255	Sep 2016	Sep 2016	Sep 2016	Sep 2016	Sep 2016	Sep 2016	40 MHz in use 4x4 MIMO, 256 QAM, LTE-U; CA of 50 MHz (CA_3A_255C).
South Sudan	Digitel	1800	3		Jul 2021					
South Sudan	Zain	2100	1		Mar 2021					
Sudan	Sudani	1800	3		Apr 2017	Apr 2017				20 MHz
Sudan	Zain	1800	3		Apr 2016					20 MHz
Tanzania	Airtel	700	28		Nov 2019					10 MHz
Tanzania	Airtel	2100	1		Apr 2022					10 MHz
Tanzania	Smile	800	20	Mar 2016	Aug 2012					
Tanzania	Smart	2300	40		Aug 2015					
Tanzania	Tigo	800	20		Apr 2015					10 MHz; CA of 15 MHz (CA_3A_20A).
Tanzania	Tigo	1800	3		Sep 2018					5 MHz; CA of 15 MHz (CA_3A_20A).
Tanzania	TTCL	1800	3		Dec 2015		Nov 2016 ?			
Tanzania	TTCL	2300	40		Dec 2015		Nov 2016 ?			
Tanzania	Vodacom	1800	3		Jun 2016					10 MHz
Tanzania	Zantel	1800	3		Apr 2016					10 MHz
Togo	Teolis	?	?		Feb 2018					FWB
Togo	Togocel	?	?		Jul 2018					
Togo	Moov	?	?		Jul 2018					
Tunisia	Ooredoo	800	20		Mar 2016					Joint infrastructure operation with Tunisie Telecom.
Tunisia	Ooredoo	1800	3		Mar 2016					15 MHz; Joint infrastructure operation with Tunisie Telecom.
Tunisia	Orange	800	20		Mar 2016					
Tunisia	Orange	1800	3		Mar 2016					15 MHz
Tunisia	Tunisie Telecom	800	20		Mar 2016					Joint infrastructure operation with Ooredoo.
Tunisia	Tunisie Telecom	1800	3		Mar 2016					15 MHz; Joint infrastructure operation with Ooredoo.
Uganda	Airtel	?	?	Jul 2023	Apr 2016					
Uganda	MTN	2600	38		Apr 2013					
Uganda	Orange	800	20		Jul 2013					
Uganda	Smile	800	20	Nov 2015	Jun 2013					
Zambia	Airtel	900	8		Dec 2017					5 MHz
Zambia	Liquid Telecom	2300	40		Jun 2017					20 MHz
Zambia	MTN	1800	3		Jan 2014					
Zambia	Zamtel	2300	40		Jan 2014					20 MHz
Zimbabwe	Econet	1800	3		Aug 2013					
Zimbabwe	Net*One	1800	3		Nov 2014					
Country	Operator	ƒ (MHz)	B	VoLTE	Launch date Cat.3 ≤ 100 Mbit/s	Launch date Cat.4 ≤ 150 Mbit/s	Launch date Cat.6 ≤ 300 Mbit/s	Launch date Cat.9 ≤ 450 Mbit/s	Launch date Cat.11 ≤ 600 Mbit/s	Notes

== See also ==
- LTE
- LTE frequency bands
- List of LTE networks
- List of UMTS networks
- List of HSPA+ networks
- List of CDMA2000 networks
- UMTS frequency bands
- List of mobile network operators of the Middle East and Africa
- Mobile Network Codes in ITU region 6xx (Africa)
