= Direct Inward Dialing Worldwide Ireland Limited =

DIDWW
- Company type: Private
- Industry: Telecommunications
- Founded: 2004; 22 years ago
- Headquarters: Dublin, Ireland
- Area served: Worldwide
- Products: Virtual telephone numbers, SIP trunking, SMS services
- Website: www.didww.com

Direct Inward Dialing Worldwide Ireland Limited (known as "DIDWW Ireland Limited") is an Irish telecommunications company that provides virtual telephone numbers, SIP trunking, and SMS services for businesses and telecommunications operators. The company operates internationally and offers local, national, toll-free, shared-cost, and mobile telephone numbers in more than 90 countries.

== History ==
DIDWW Ireland Limited was founded in 2004 and is headquartered in Dublin, Ireland. The company operates as DIDWW Ireland Limited.

In 2019 and 2020, DIDWW Ireland Limited established the Telephony Museum in Šiauliai, Lithuania.

It provides cloud-based telecommunications services including direct inward dialing (DID) numbers, SIP trunking, and SMS messaging. The company offers local, national, toll-free, shared-cost, and mobile virtual phone numbers in multiple jurisdictions worldwide.

In October 2021, DIDWW launched Universal International Freephone Number (UIFN) services, enabling businesses to use globally reachable toll-free numbers under the ITU +800 numbering system.

== Telecommunications licences and numbering resources ==
DIDWW holds telecommunications operator licences in multiple countries across Europe and other regions.

In April 2022, the International Telecommunication Union (ITU) published the assignment of a shared Mobile Country Code (MCC) and Mobile Network Code (MNC) to DIDWW under ITU-T Recommendation E.212 in Operational Bulletin No. 1242.

The company has also stated that it was allocated numbering resources under the ITU international shared country code +883 framework for international networks.

== Certifications ==
DIDWW received ISO/IEC 27001 certification for information security management in 2022.

== Memberships ==
DIDWW is a member of several telecommunications industry organizations, including the GSMA, the Communications Fraud Control Association (CFCA), and the Pacific Telecommunications Council (PTC).

== See also ==
- Voice over IP
- Session Initiation Protocol
- International Telecommunication Union
