= Estelle Akofio-Sowah =

Ghanaian businesswoman

- Born: Scotland
- Citizenship: Ghanaian
- Education: Ghana International School; University of Sussex (Economics and Development Studies)
- Occupation: Businesswoman
- Employer(s): CSquared; Google Ghana; BusyInternet
- Organization(s): CSquared; Google Ghana; BusyInternet
- Known for: ICT leadership in Ghana; Digital infrastructure development
- Title: Country Manager, CSquared Ghana; Former Country Manager, Google Ghana; Former Managing Director, BusyInternet
- Board member of: Databank; Stanbic Bank; Ghana International School
- Awards: Top 50 Corporate Women Leaders in Ghana (WomanRising, 2016); Top 100 Women CEOs in Africa (2019)

Estelle Akofio-Sowah is a Ghanaian businesswoman and the current CSquared Ghana Country Manager and former Google Ghana country manager. Estelle was once the managing director of BusyInternet, an internet service provider in Ghana.

== Early life ==
Born in Scotland to a Ghanaian father, her family moved to Osu in Ghana when she was 6 months old.

== Education ==
She attended Ghana International School then to University of Sussex from which she has a degree in Economics and Development Studies and also a Fellow of the second class of the Africa Leadership Initiative-West Africa and a member of the Aspen Global Leadership Network.

== Career ==
She is the current country lead for Google Ghana. She previously served as managing director for Busyinternet, a company that deals with ISP, cybercafe and business incubator. She was the conference and banquet manager at La Palm Royal Beach Hotel and project manager of the National Poverty Reduction Program at ProNet, the local NGO partner to WaterAid UK. She was the President of the Ghana Internet Service Providers Association.

In November 2021, CSquared, where Estelle Akofio-Sowah serves as the West Africa Regional Manager, received a license from the Liberia Telecommunications Authority to deploy fiber optic cables across the country. This initiative is intended to support the increasing ICT needs of Liberia's young population.

In 2019, Estelle Akofio-Sowah was recognized as one of the Top 100 Women CEOs in Africa, a list that included leaders from 24 countries and 18 industries. She is also a board member of Databank, Stanbic Bank, and the Ghana International School. Additionally, she serves as a member of the Ministerial Advisory Committee to Ghana’s Minister of Communications.

Estelle Akofio-Sowah has been involved in various initiatives focused on improving Ghana's ICT infrastructure and promoting digital literacy. In September 2023, Estelle Akofio-Sowah participated in a meeting between CSquared and the Ghana Grid Company Limited (GRIDCo) to discuss potential opportunities for improving internet connectivity in Ghana.

== Awards ==
She was ranked among 2016's Top 50 Corporate Women Leaders in Ghana by WomanRising.
