= Mobile network codes in ITU region 5xx (Oceania) =

This list contains the mobile country codes and mobile network codes for networks with country codes between 500 and 599, inclusively – a region that covers Oceania, Maritime South East Asia, and Thailand. Guam and the Northern Mariana Islands as parts of the United States are listed under Mobile Network Codes in ITU region 3xx (North America).

== National operators ==
=== A ===
==== American Samoa (United States of America) – AS ====
| MCC | MNC | Brand | Operator | Status | Bands (MHz) | References and notes |
|---|---|---|---|---|---|---|
| 311 | 780 | ASTCA | American Samoa Telecommunications | Operational | LTE 700 | Uses United States MCC |
| 544 | 11 | Bluesky | Bluesky | Operational | GSM 850 / GSM 1900 / UMTS 850 / LTE 700 / LTE 1900 | |

==== Australia – AU/CC/CX ====
includes

- Cocos Islands (Australia) – CC
- Christmas Island (Australia) – CX

| MCC | MNC | Brand | Operator | Status | Bands (MHz) | References and notes |
|---|---|---|---|---|---|---|
| 505 | 01 | Telstra | Telstra | Operational | LTE 700 / LTE 850 / LTE 1800 / LTE 2100 / LTE 2600 / 5G 850 / 5G 2600 / 5G 3500 / 5G 28000 | LTE bands 28 / 26 / 3 / 1 / 7; GSM shut down Dec 2016, UMTS 2100 – Mar 2019, UMTS 850 – 28 Oct 2024 |
| 505 | 02 | Optus | Singtel Optus | Operational | LTE 700 / LTE 900 / LTE 1800 / LTE 2100 / TD-LTE 2300 / LTE 2600 / 5G 900 / 5G 1800 / 5G 2100 / TD-5G 2300 / 5G 3500 / 5G 28000 | LTE bands 28 / 8 / 3 / 1 / 7; GSM shut down Aug 2017, UMTS 2100 – May 2022, UMTS 900 – Oct 2024 |
| 505 | 03 | Vodafone | TPG Telecom | Operational | LTE 850 / LTE 1800 / LTE 2100 / 5G 700 / 5G 1800 / 5G 2100 / 5G 3500 / 5G 28000 | LTE bands 5 / 3 / 1; GSM shut down Apr 2018, UMTS – Dec 2023 |
| 505 | 04 | | Department of Defence | Operational | Unknown | Private network |
| 505 | 05 | Ozitel | | Not operational | | Brand was taken over by Telstra; MNC withdrawn |
| 505 | 06 | 3 | Vodafone Hutchison Australia | Not operational | UMTS 2100 | Vodafone Hutchison Australia and Telstra ended their network sharing agreement on 31 August 2012. The 3TELSTRA network was shut down on this date. |
| 505 | 07 | | TPG Telecom | Unknown | Unknown | Former Vodafone |
| 505 | 08 | One.Tel | One.Tel | Not operational | GSM 900 | MNC withdrawn |
| 505 | 09 | Airnet | | Not operational | | MNC withdrawn |
| 505 | 10 | Norfolk Island | Norfolk Telecom | Operational | GSM 900 | |
| 505 | 11 | Telstra | Telstra | Operational | LTE 2600 | Direct-to-Cell - will appear as "Telstra SpaceX" for supported handsets. |
| 505 | 12 | 3 | Vodafone Hutchison Australia | Not operational | UMTS 2100 | See MNC 06 |
| 505 | 13 | RailCorp | Railcorp, Transport for NSW | Operational | GSM-R 1800 | For use by Sydney Trains Digital Train Radio System |
| 505 | 14 | AAPT | TPG Telecom | Not operational | MVNO | MNC withdrawn |
| 505 | 15 | 3GIS | | Not operational | UMTS | Telstra & Hutchison 3G; MNC withdrawn |
| 505 | 16 | VicTrack | Victorian Rail Track | Operational | GSM-R 1800 | Digital Train Radio System |
| 505 | 17 | Optus | Optus Mobile | Operational | TD-LTE 2300 | Former Vivid Wireless, Singtel Optus |
| 505 | 18 | Pactel | Pactel International | Not operational | | MNC withdrawn |
| 505 | 19 | Lycamobile | Lycamobile | Operational | MVNO | |
| 505 | 20 | | Ausgrid Corporation | Not operational | Unknown | MNC withdrawn |
| 505 | 21 | | Queensland Rail | Unknown | GSM-R 1800 | |
| 505 | 22 | | iiNet | Not operational | Unknown | MNC withdrawn |
| 505 | 23 | | Vocus | Operational | LTE 1800 / LTE 2100 | Former Challenge Networks; private networks, primarily for mining industry |
| 505 | 24 | | Advanced Communications Technologies | Unknown | Unknown | |
| 505 | 25 | | Pilbara Iron | Unknown | Unknown | |
| 505 | 26 | | Sinch Australia | Unknown | MVNO | Former Dialogue Communications |
| 505 | 27 | | Ergon Energy Telecommunications | Unknown | Unknown | Former Nexium, Yurika |
| 505 | 28 | | RCOM International | Not operational | Unknown | MNC withdrawn |
| 505 | 30 | | Compatel | Not operational | Unknown | MNC withdrawn |
| 505 | 31 | | BHP | Unknown | Unknown | |
| 505 | 32 | | Thales Australia | Unknown | Unknown | |
| 505 | 33 | | Sinch Australia | Unknown | MVNO | Former CLX Networks |
| 505 | 34 | | Santos | Unknown | Unknown | |
| 505 | 35 | | Bird.com | Unknown | Unknown | Former MessageBird |
| 505 | 36 | Optus | Singtel Optus | Unknown | Unknown | |
| 505 | 37 | | Yancoal | Unknown | Unknown | |
| 505 | 38 | Truphone | TP Operations Australia | Operational | MVNO | Formerly Crazy John's |
| 505 | 39 | Telstra | Telstra | Unknown | Unknown | |
| 505 | 40 | | CITIC Pacific Mining | Unknown | Unknown | |
| 505 | 41 | | Aqura Technologies | Unknown | Unknown | Former OTOC |
| 505 | 42 | GEMCO | Groote Eylandt Mining Company | Unknown | Unknown | |
| 505 | 43 | | Arrow Energy | Unknown | Unknown | |
| 505 | 44 | | Roy Hill | Unknown | Unknown | |
| 505 | 45 | | Clermont Coal Operations | Unknown | Unknown | |
| 505 | 46 | | AngloGold Ashanti Australia Ltd | Unknown | Unknown | |
| 505 | 47 | | Woodside Energy | Not operational | Unknown | MNC withdrawn |
| 505 | 48 | | Titan ICT | Unknown | Unknown | |
| 505 | 49 | | Field Solutions Group | Unknown | Unknown | |
| 505 | 50 | | Pivotel Group | Operational | Satellite | |
| 505 | 51 | | Fortescue | Unknown | Unknown | |
| 505 | 52 | | OptiTel Australia | Operational | LTE 1800 / LTE 2100 / 5G 1800 / 5G 2100 | Research, development, and operation; Northern Territory |
| 505 | 53 | | Shell Australia | Unknown | Unknown | |
| 505 | 54 | | SimCorner Pty Ltd | Operational | MVNO | Former Nokia |
| 505 | 55 | | New South Wales Government Telecommunications Authority | Unknown | Unknown | |
| 505 | 56 | | Nokia | Unknown | Unknown | |
| 505 | 57 | CiFi | Christmas Island Fibre Internet | Unknown | Unknown | |
| 505 | 58 | | Wi-Sky | Operational | Unknown | |
| 505 | 59 | | Starlink | Operational | Satellite | |
| 505 | 60 | | Starlink | Operational | Satellite | |
| 505 | 61 | CommTel NS | Commtel Network Solutions | Implement / Design | LTE 1800 / LTE 2100 | |
| 505 | 62 | NBN | NBN_Co | Operational | TD-LTE 2300 / TD-LTE 3500 / 5G 28000 | LTE band 40 / 42 |
| 505 | 63 | MarchNet | March IT | Unknown | Unknown | |
| 505 | 64 | | Roam Aussie Pty Ltd | Unknown | Unknown | |
| 505 | 65 | Digital Soul | Fear Enterprises Pty Ltd | Operational | Unknown | |
| 505 | 68 | NBN | NBN_Co | Operational | TD-LTE 2300 / TD-LTE 3500 / 5G 28000 | LTE band 40 / 42 |
| 505 | 71 | Telstra | Telstra | Operational | Unknown | |
| 505 | 72 | Telstra | Telstra | Operational | Unknown | |
| 505 | 88 | | Pivotel Group | Operational | Satellite | Former Localstar Holding |
| 505 | 90 | | Alphawest | Unknown | Unknown | Former Optus, UE Access |
| 505 | 99 | Telstra | Telstra | Unknown | Unknown | Former One.Tel; rail operators purchased 1800 spectrum |

=== B ===
==== Brunei – BN ====
| MCC | MNC | Brand | Operator | Status | Bands (MHz) | References and notes |
|---|---|---|---|---|---|---|
| 528 | 01 | TelBru | Telekom Brunei Berhad | Unknown | Unknown | Former Jabatan Telekom Brunei |
| 528 | 02 | PCSB | Progresif Cellular Sdn Bhd | Operational | UMTS 2100 | Former B-Mobile |
| 528 | 03 | UNN | Unified National Networks Sdn Bhd | Operational | LTE 1800 / 5G 700 / 5G 1800 / 5G 3500 | |
| 528 | 11 | DST | Data Stream Technology Sdn Bhd | Operational | UMTS 2100 / LTE 1800 | GSM shut down June 2021 |

=== C ===
==== Cook Islands (Pacific Ocean) – CK ====
| MCC | MNC | Brand | Operator | Status | Bands (MHz) | References and notes |
|---|---|---|---|---|---|---|
| 548 | 01 | Vodafone | Telecom Cook Islands | Operational | GSM 900 / UMTS 900 / LTE 700 / LTE 1800 | Former Bluesky; LTE bands 20 / 3 |
| 548 | 02 | | VakaNET Ltd. | Unknown | Unknown | |

=== E ===
==== East Timor – TL ====
| MCC | MNC | Brand | Operator | Status | Bands (MHz) | References and notes |
|---|---|---|---|---|---|---|
| 514 | 01 | Telkomcel | PT Telekomunikasi Indonesia International | Operational | GSM 900 / GSM 1800 / UMTS 850 / LTE | |
| 514 | 02 | TT | Timor Telecom | Operational | GSM 900 / UMTS / LTE 1800 | |
| 514 | 03 | Telemor | Viettel Timor-Leste | Operational | GSM 900 / GSM 1800 / UMTS / LTE 1800 | |

=== F ===
==== Fiji – FJ ====
| MCC | MNC | Brand | Operator | Status | Bands (MHz) | References and notes |
|---|---|---|---|---|---|---|
| 542 | 01 | Vodafone | Vodafone Fiji | Operational | GSM 900 / UMTS 2100 / LTE 1800 | |
| 542 | 02 | Digicel | Digicel Fiji | Operational | GSM 900 / UMTS 900 / UMTS 2100 / LTE 700 / LTE 1800 / WiMAX | |
| 542 | 03 | TFL | Telecom Fiji Ltd | Operational | CDMA2000 850 / LTE 700 | LTE band 28 |

==== French Polynesia (France) – PF ====
| MCC | MNC | Brand | Operator | Status | Bands (MHz) | References and notes |
|---|---|---|---|---|---|---|
| 547 | 05 | Ora | VITI | Operational | WiMAX / LTE 800 / LTE 2600 | |
| 547 | 10 | | Mara Telecom | Not operational | GSM 900 | Bankrupt in 2013 |
| 547 | 15 | Vodafone | Pacific Mobile Telecom | Operational | GSM 900 / UMTS 900 / UMTS 2100 / LTE 800 / LTE 2100 | |
| 547 | 20 | Vini | Onati S.A.S. | Operational | GSM 900 / UMTS 900 / UMTS 2100 / LTE 800 / LTE 2600 | |

=== I ===
==== Indonesia – ID ====
| MCC | MNC | Brand | Operator | Status | Bands (MHz) | References and notes |
|---|---|---|---|---|---|---|
| 510 | 00 | PSN | PT Pasifik Satelit Nusantara | Operational | Satellite | |
| 510 | 01 | Indosat | PT Indosat Tbk | Operational | GSM 900 / GSM 1800 / LTE 900 / LTE 1800 / 5G 1800 | Former PT Satelindo; UMTS shut down Dec 2022 |
| 510 | 03 | StarOne | PT Indosat Tbk | Not operational | CDMA2000 800 | Shut down June 2015 |
| 510 | 07 | TelkomFlexi | PT Telkom Indonesia Tbk | Not operational | CDMA2000 800 | Network shut down 2015 |
| 510 | 08 | AXIS | PT Natrindo Telepon Seluler | Not operational | GSM 1800 / UMTS 2100 | Merged with XL (MNC 11), MNC 08 no longer used |
| 510 | 09 | Smartfren | PT XLSMART Telecom Sejahtera Tbk | Operational | LTE 850 / TD-LTE 2300 | CDMA 1900 shut down Dec 2016, CDMA 850 shut down Nov 2017 |
| 510 | 10 | Telkomsel | PT Telekomunikasi Selular | Operational | GSM 900 / GSM 1800 / LTE 900 / LTE 1800 / TD-LTE 2300 / 5G 2100 / 5G 2300 | UMTS shut down June 2023 |
| 510 | 11 | XL | PT XLSMART Telecom Sejahtera Tbk | Operational | GSM 900 / GSM 1800 / LTE 900 / LTE 1800 / 5G 1800 / 5G 2100 | UMTS shut down March 2022 |
| 510 | 20 | TelkomMobile | PT Telkom Indonesia Tbk | Not operational | GSM 1800 | Merged with Telkomsel |
| 510 | 21 | Indosat | PT Indosat Tbk | Operational | GSM 900 / GSM 1800 | Former Indosat-M3; merged with Indosat (MNC 01) |
| 510 | 27 | Net1 | PT Net Satu Indonesia | Not operational | LTE 450 | Former Ceria, Sampoerna Telekomunikasi; CDMA 450 shut down 2017; license revoked Nov 2021 |
| 510 | 28 | Fren/Hepi | PT Mobile-8 Telecom | Operational | LTE 850 / TD-LTE 2300 | Merged with SMART (MNC 09), CDMA 850 shut down Nov 2017 |
| 510 | 78 | hinet | PT Berca Hardayaperkasa | Not operational | TD-LTE 2300 | Shut down Nov 2022 |
| 510 | 88 | Bolt! | PT Internux | Not operational | TD-LTE 2300 | Shut down Dec 2018 |
| 510 | 89 | 3 | PT Hutchison 3 Indonesia | Operational | GSM 1800 / LTE 1800 | Merged with Indosat (MNC 01); UMTS shut down Dec 2022 |
| 510 | 99 | Esia | PT Bakrie Telecom | Not Operational | CDMA2000 800 | Merged with Smartfren (MNC 09) |

=== K ===
==== Kiribati – KI ====
| MCC | MNC | Brand | Operator | Status | Bands (MHz) | References and notes |
|---|---|---|---|---|---|---|
| 545 | 01 | Kiribati - ATH | Amalgamated Telecom Holdings Kiribati Limited | Operational | UMTS 900 / LTE 1800 | Former Telecom Services Kiribati Ltd (TSKL) |
| 545 | 02 | | OceanLink | Unknown | Unknown | |
| 545 | 09 | Kiribati - Frigate Net | Amalgamated Telecom Holdings Kiribati Limited | Operational | GSM 900 | |

=== M ===
==== Malaysia – MY ====
| MCC | MNC | Brand | Operator | Status | Bands (MHz) | References and notes |
|---|---|---|---|---|---|---|
| 502 | 01 | ATUR 450 | Telekom Malaysia Bhd | Not operational | CDMA2000 450 | |
| 502 | 10 | | Celcom, DiGi, Maxis, Tune Talk, U Mobile, Unifi, XOX, Yes | Operational | GSM 900 / GSM 1800 / LTE 1800 / LTE 2600 | Former Celcom; UMTS shut down Dec 2021 |
| 502 | 11 | TM Homeline | Telekom Malaysia Bhd | Operational | CDMA2000 850 / LTE 850 | |
| 502 | 12 | Maxis | Maxis Communications Berhad | Operational | GSM 900 / LTE 1800 / LTE 2100 / LTE 2600 / 5G 700 / 5G 3500 / 5G 28000 | Used by MVNO Kartu As; LTE 2600 in co-operation with REDtone; UMTS shut down Dec 2021; 5G provided by DNB |
| 502 | 13 | CelcomDigi | Celcom Axiata Berhad | Operational | GSM 900 / LTE 1800 / LTE 2100 / LTE 2600 / 5G 700 / 5G 3500 / 5G 28000 | Former Emartel, TMTouch; LTE 2600 in co-operation with Altel; UMTS shut down Dec 2021; reactivated in 2023 for Celcom and DiGi Telecommunications network integration; 5G provided by DNB |
| 502 | 14 | | Telekom Malaysia Berhad for PSTN SMS | Unknown | | |
| 502 | 150 | Tune Talk | Tune Talk Sdn Bhd | Operational | MVNO | uses Celcom |
| 502 | 151 | SalamFone | Baraka Telecom Sdn Bhd | Not operational | MVNO | (MVNO)-MAXIS, previously using DiGi; MNC withdrawn |
| 502 | 152 | Yes | YTL Communications Sdn Bhd | Operational | TD-LTE 2300 / TD-LTE 2600 / 5G 700 / 5G 3500 / 5G 28000 | WiMAX shut down 2019; 5G provided by DNB |
| 502 | 153 | unifi | TM Technology Services Sdn Bhd | Operational | WiMAX 2300 / LTE 850 / TD-LTE 2300 / 5G 700 / 5G 3500 / 5G 28000 | Former Packet One Networks and Webe Digital Sdn Bhd; subsidiary of Telekom Malaysia; 5G provided by DNB; domestic roaming with Celcom and Maxis |
| 502 | 154 | Tron | Talk Focus Sdn Bhd | Not operational | MVNO | Uses Digi, shut down on 17 Jan 2019 |
| 502 | 155 | Clixster | Clixster Mobile Sdn Bhd | Not operational | MVNO | Uses Digi; MNC withdrawn |
| 502 | 156 | Altel | Altel Communications Sdn Bhd | Operational | MVNO | Using Celcom; LTE 2600 band licensed to Celcom |
| 502 | 157 | Telin | Telekomunikasi Indonesia International (M) Sdn Bhd | Operational | MVNO | Uses U Mobile |
| 502 | 16 | DiGi | DiGi Telecommunications | Operational | GSM 1800 / LTE 900 / LTE 1800 / LTE 2100 / LTE 2600 | LTE 2600 coverage limited to certain areas in the Klang Valley at the moment; former Mutiara Telecom; UMTS shut down Dec 2021 |
| 502 | 17 | Maxis | Maxis Communications Berhad | Operational | GSM 900 / LTE 1800 / LTE 2100 / LTE 2600 | Former TimeCel, Adam017; UMTS shut down Dec 2021 |
| 502 | 18 | U Mobile | U Mobile Sdn Bhd | Operational | LTE 1800 / LTE 2100 / LTE 2600 / 5G 700 / 5G 3500 | Domestic Roaming with Maxis, also for GSM; former Mobikom; UMTS shut down Dec 2021 |
| 502 | 19 | Celcom | Celcom Axiata Berhad | Operational | GSM 900 / LTE 1800 / LTE 2100 / LTE 2600 | UMTS shut down Dec 2021 |
| 502 | 20 | Electcoms | Electcoms Berhad | Not operational | DMR | MNC withdrawn |

==== Marshall Islands – MH ====
| MCC | MNC | Brand | Operator | Status | Bands (MHz) | References and notes |
|---|---|---|---|---|---|---|
| 551 | 01 | | Marshall Islands National Telecommunications Authority (MINTA) | Operational | GSM 900 / GSM 1800 / LTE 700 | |

==== Federated States of Micronesia – FM ====
| MCC | MNC | Brand | Operator | Status | Bands (MHz) | References and notes |
|---|---|---|---|---|---|---|
| 550 | 01 | | FSMTC | Operational | GSM 900 / LTE 1800 | |
| 550 | 02 | iBoom! | Boom! Inc. | Unknown | Unknown | |

=== N ===
==== Nauru – NR ====
| MCC | MNC | Brand | Operator | Status | Bands (MHz) | References and notes |
|---|---|---|---|---|---|---|
| 536 | 02 | Digicel | Digicel (Nauru) Corporation | Operational | GSM 900 / GSM 1800 / UMTS 2100 / LTE 1800 | Also uses MCC 542 MNC 02 (Fiji) |
| 536 | 03 | | Nauru Telikom Corporation | Unknown | Unknown | |

==== New Caledonia (France) – NC ====
| MCC | MNC | Brand | Operator | Status | Bands (MHz) | References and notes |
|---|---|---|---|---|---|---|
| 546 | 01 | Mobilis | OPT New Caledonia | Operational | GSM 900 / UMTS 900 / LTE 800 / LTE 1800 / LTE 2600 | |

==== New Zealand – NZ ====
| MCC | MNC | Brand | Operator | Status | Bands (MHz) | References and notes |
|---|---|---|---|---|---|---|
| 530 | 00 | Spark | Spark New Zealand | Not operational | AMPS 800 / TDMA 800 | Former Telecom New Zealand; shut down on 31 March 2007 |
| 530 | 01 | One NZ | One NZ | Operational | LTE 700 / LTE 900 / LTE 1800 / LTE 2100 / LTE 2600 / 5G 3500 | Former Vodafone New Zealand; GSM / UMTS shut down Mar 2026 |
| 530 | 02 | Spark | Spark New Zealand SpaceX | Operational | LTE 2600 | Used for Direct to Cell on Band 7. Former Telecom New Zealand. CDMA shut down July 2012. |
| 530 | 03 | Woosh | Woosh Wireless | Not operational | UMTS-TDD 2000 | Wireless broadband only |
| 530 | 04 | One NZ | One NZ | Not operational | UMTS 2100 | Former TelstraClear, Vodafone |
| 530 | 05 | Spark | Spark New Zealand | Operational | LTE 700 / 5G 850 / LTE 1800 / LTE 2100 / TD-LTE/5G 2300 / LTE 2600 / 5G 3500 | Former Telecom New Zealand; UMTS shut down Mar 2026 |
| 530 | 06 | | FX Networks | Unknown | Unknown | |
| 530 | 07 | | Dense Air New Zealand | Unknown | Unknown | Former Bluereach Limited |
| 530 | 11 | | Tū Ātea | Operational | TD-LTE 2300 / 5G 3500 | Formerly the Interim Māori Spectrum Commission. |
| 530 | 12 | BAINZ | Broadband & Internet New Zealand Limited | Unknown | 5G n78 (3.30-3.34 GHz) regional | |
| 530 | 13 | One NZ | One NZ SpaceX | Operational | LTE 1800 / LTE 2600 | Used for Direct to Cell on Band 3 & 7. |
| 530 | 14 | 2degrees | 2degrees Lynk | Not operational | LTE 900 | Used for Direct to Cell on Band 8. Not yet open to the public. |
| 530 | 15 | Spark | Spark New Zealand | Unknown | Unknown | |
| 530 | 24 | 2degrees | 2degrees | Operational | LTE 700 / LTE 900 / LTE 1800 / LTE 2100 / 5G 3500 | GSM shut down in Mar 2018, UMTS in Feb 2026 |

==== Niue – NU ====
| MCC | MNC | Brand | Operator | Status | Bands (MHz) | References and notes |
|---|---|---|---|---|---|---|
| 555 | 01 | Telecom Niue | Telecom Niue | Operational | GSM 900 / LTE 700 | |

==== Norfolk Island – NF ====
| MCC | MNC | Brand | Operator | Status | Bands (MHz) | References and notes |
|---|---|---|---|---|---|---|
| 505 | 10 | Norfolk Telecom | Norfolk Telecom | Operational | GSM 900 / LTE 1800 | |

=== P ===
==== Palau – PW ====
| MCC | MNC | Brand | Operator | Status | Bands (MHz) | References and notes |
|---|---|---|---|---|---|---|
| 552 | 01 | PNCC | Palau National Communications Corp. | Operational | GSM 900 / UMTS 900 / LTE 700 | |
| 552 | 02 | PT Waves | Palau Equipment Company Inc. | Operational | GSM 900 | |
| 552 | 80 | Palau Mobile | Palau Mobile Corporation | Not operational | GSM 1800 | Service shutdown in 2014 |
| 552 | 99 | PMCI | Palau Mobile Communications Inc. | Operational | LTE | |

==== Papua New Guinea – PG ====
| MCC | MNC | Brand | Operator | Status | Bands (MHz) | References and notes |
|---|---|---|---|---|---|---|
| 537 | 01 | bmobile | Bemobile Limited | Operational | GSM 900 / UMTS 900 | |
| 537 | 02 | citifon | Telikom PNG Ltd. | Operational | CDMA2000 450 / LTE 700 | Formerly Greencom; LTE band 28 |
| 537 | 03 | Digicel | Digicel PNG | Operational | GSM 900 / UMTS 900 / LTE 700 | LTE band 28 |
| 537 | 04 | | Digitec Communication Ltd. | Unknown | Unknown | |

==== Philippines – PH ====
| MCC | MNC | Brand | Operator | Status | Bands (MHz) | References and notes |
|---|---|---|---|---|---|---|
| 515 | 01 | G Starlink | Globe Telecom's Innove Communications via Starlink | Operational | LTE 700 / LTE 1800 / LTE 2100 / TD-LTE 2300 / TD-LTE 2500 | Formerly known in the '90s as ISLACOM prior to Globe Telecom's acquisition in 2001. |
| 515 | 02 | Globe | Globe Telecom | Operational | GSM 900 / GSM 1800 / LTE 700 / LTE 1800 / TD-LTE 2300 / TD-LTE 2500 / 5G 3500 | UMTS shut down 2022 |
| 515 | 03 | SMART | PLDT via Smart Communications | Operational | GSM 900 / GSM 1800 / UMTS 850 / UMTS 2100 / LTE 700 / LTE 850 / LTE 1800 / LTE 2100 / TD-LTE 2300 / TD-LTE 2500 / 5G 3500 | Formerly known as PILTEL |
| 515 | 05 | Sun Cellular | Digital Telecommunications Philippines | Not operational | GSM 1800 / UMTS 2100 | Folded in 2022 and subscribers were absorbed by SMART. |
| 515 | 11 | | PLDT via ACeS Philippines | Unknown | Unknown | |
| 515 | 18 | Cure | PLDT via Smart's Connectivity Unlimited Resources Enterprise | Not operational | GSM 900 / UMTS 2100 | Formerly ümobile, then Red Mobile; ceased operations in 2012 and its assigned frequencies were surrendered to, and bidded out by NTC as conditions for PLDT's takeover of DIGITEL/Sun Cellular |
| 515 | 24 | ABS-CBN Mobile | ABS-CBN Convergence with Globe Telecom | Not operational | MVNO | |
| 515 | 66 | DITO | Dito Telecommunity Corp. | Operational | LTE 700 / LTE 2100 / TD-LTE 2500 / 5G 3500 | |
| 515 | 88 | | Next Mobile Inc. | Unknown | iDEN | Former Nextel Philippines |

=== S ===
==== Samoa – WS ====
| MCC | MNC | Brand | Operator | Status | Bands (MHz) | References and notes |
|---|---|---|---|---|---|---|
| 549 | 00 | Digicel | Digicel Pacific Ltd. | Operational | LTE 700 / LTE 1800 / LTE 2100 | |
| 549 | 01 | Digicel | Digicel Pacific Ltd. | Operational | GSM 900 / UMTS 2100 / LTE 1800 | Former Telecom Samoa Cellular Ltd. |
| 549 | 27 | Vodafone | Vodafone Samoa Ltd. | Operational | GSM 900 / LTE 700 / LTE 1800 | Former Samoatel Ltd., Bluesky Samoa |

==== Singapore – SG ====
| MCC | MNC | Brand | Operator | Status | Bands (MHz) | References and notes |
|---|---|---|---|---|---|---|
| 525 | 01 | SingTel | Singapore Telecom | Operational | LTE 900 / LTE 1800 / LTE 2600 / 5G 700 / 5G 2100 / 5G 3500 / 5G 28000 | GSM shut down Apr 2017, UMTS Nov 2024 |
| 525 | 02 | SingTel-G18 | Singapore Telecom | Not operational | GSM 1800 | GSM shut down on 1 April 2017 |
| 525 | 03 | M1 | M1 Limited | Operational | LTE 1800 / LTE 2600 / 5G 2100 / 5G 3500 | GSM shut down Apr 2017, UMTS Aug 2024 UMTS Nov 2024 |
| 525 | 04 | Grid | Grid Communications Pte Ltd. | Operational | LTE 800 | |
| 525 | 05 | StarHub | StarHub Mobile | Operational | LTE 1800 / LTE 2100 / LTE 2600 / TD-LTE 2500 / 5G 2100 / 5G 3500 | GSM shut down Apr 2017, UMTS Nov 2024 |
| 525 | 06 | StarHub | StarHub Mobile | Unknown | Unknown | |
| 525 | 07 | StarHub | StarHub Mobile | Unknown | Unknown | Former SingTel |
| 525 | 08 | StarHub | StarHub Mobile | Unknown | Unknown | |
| 525 | 09 | Circles.Life | Liberty Wireless Pte Ltd | Operational | MVNO | |
| 525 | 10 | SIMBA | Simba Telecom Pte Ltd | Operational | LTE 900 / TD-LTE 2300 / TD-LTE 2500 / 5G 2100 / 5G 26000 / 5G 28000 | Former TPG Telecom |
| 525 | 11 | M1 | M1 Limited | Unknown | Unknown | |
| 525 | 12 | Grid | Grid Communications Pte Ltd. | Operational | iDEN 800 | Digital Trunked Radio Network |
| 525 | 200 | | 5G Test Bed | Unknown | 5G | |
| 525 | 201 | | 5G EP Twin Networks | Unknown | 5G | |
| 525 | 202 | | 5G EP Twin Networks | Unknown | 5G | |
| 525 | 203 | | 5G EP Twin Networks | Unknown | 5G | |
| 525 | 204 | | 5G EP Twin Networks | Unknown | 5G | |
| 525 | 205 | | 5G EP Test Bed | Unknown | 5G | |

==== Solomon Islands – SB ====
| MCC | MNC | Brand | Operator | Status | Bands (MHz) | References and notes |
|---|---|---|---|---|---|---|
| 540 | 01 | BREEZE | Our Telekom | Operational | GSM 900 / UMTS 850 / UMTS 2100 / LTE 700 / LTE 1800 | Former Solomon Telekom Co Ltd |
| 540 | 02 | BeMobile | BMobile (SI) Ltd | Operational | GSM 900 / GSM 1800 / UMTS 2100 | |

=== T ===
==== Thailand – TH ====
| MCC | MNC | Brand | Operator | Status | Bands (MHz) | References and notes |
|---|---|---|---|---|---|---|
| 520 | 00 | TrueMove H / my by NT | National Telecom Public Company Limited | Not Operational | UMTS 850 | Former Hutch Thailand, CAT Telecom; inbound roaming for TrueMove H, UMTS 850 switch off in August 2025 |
| 520 | 01 | AIS | Advanced Info Service | Operational | GSM 900 | UMTS 900 shut down in 2013 |
| 520 | 02 | my by NT | National Telecom Public Company Limited | Operational | LTE 700 | Former CAT Telecom; CDMA shut down in April 2013 UMTS 850 shut down in August 2025, LTE roaming with network 520-03 |
| 520 | 03 | AIS | Advanced Wireless Network Company Ltd. | Operational | UMTS 2100 / LTE 700 / LTE 900 / LTE 1800 / LTE 2100 / 5G 700 / 5G 2500 | |
| 520 | 04 | TrueMove H | True Move H Universal Communication Company Ltd. | Operational | UMTS 2100 / LTE 700 / LTE 900 / LTE 1800 / LTE 2100 / 5G 700 / 5G 2500 | UMTS roaming with network 520-00 |
| 520 | 05 | dtac | DTAC TriNet Company Ltd. | Operational | UMTS 900 / UMTS 2100 / LTE 700 / LTE 1800 / LTE 2100 / 5G 700 | |
| 520 | 09 | | Royal Thai Police | Operational | LTE 850 | LTE band 26 |
| 520 | 15 | AIS-T / NT Mobile | National Telecom Public Company Limited | Not operational | UMTS 2100 / LTE 2100 | Former Thaimobile 1900, ACT Mobile, TOT Public Company Limited; switch off in August 2025 |
| 520 | 17 | NT Mobile | National Telecom Public Company Limited | Not operational | TD-LTE 2300 | Former TOT Public Company Limited; LTE band 40; for NT Mobile and MVNO except dtac-T and True-T uses 520-47, UMTS 850 uses 520-02; LTE 2300 switch off in August 2025 |
| 520 | 18 | dtac | Total Access Communications Public Company Ltd. | Operational | GSM 1800 | |
| 520 | 20 | ACeS | ACeS | Unknown | Satellite | |
| 520 | 23 | AIS GSM 1800 | Digital Phone Company Ltd. | Not operational | GSM 1800 | Owned by AIS; network shut down in October 2019 |
| 520 | 25 | WE PCT | True Corporation | Not operational | PHS 1900 | In Bangkok area |
| 520 | 47 | dtac-T, True-T | National Telecom Public Company Limited | Not operational | TD-LTE 2300 | Former TOT Public Company Limited; LTE band 40; for dtac and Truemove-H only; LTE 2300 switch off in August 2025 |
| 520 | 99 | TrueMove | True Corporation | Operational | GSM 1800 | |

==== Tokelau – TK ====
| MCC | MNC | Brand | Operator | Status | Bands (MHz) | References and notes |
|---|---|---|---|---|---|---|
| 554 | 01 | | Teletok | Operational | LTE 700 | |

==== Tonga – TO ====
| MCC | MNC | Brand | Operator | Status | Bands (MHz) | References and notes |
|---|---|---|---|---|---|---|
| 539 | 01 | U-Call | Tonga Communications Corporation | Operational | GSM 900 / UMTS 900 / LTE | |
| 539 | 43 | | Shoreline Communication | Operational | Unknown | |
| 539 | 88 | Digicel | Digicel (Tonga) Limited | Operational | GSM 900 / LTE 700 / LTE 1800 | Former TonFon; LTE bands 28 / 3 |

==== Tuvalu – TV ====
| MCC | MNC | Brand | Operator | Status | Bands (MHz) | References and notes |
|---|---|---|---|---|---|---|
| 553 | 01 | TTC | Tuvalu Telecom | Operational | UMTS 900 / LTE 850 | GSM shutdown in 2015 |

=== V ===
==== Vanuatu – VU ====
| MCC | MNC | Brand | Operator | Status | Bands (MHz) | References and notes |
|---|---|---|---|---|---|---|
| 541 | 00 | AIL | ACeS International (AIL) | Operational | GSM 900 | |
| 541 | 01 | SMILE | Telecom Vanuatu Ltd | Operational | GSM 900 / LTE 700 | LTE band 28 |
| 541 | 05 | Digicel | Digicel Vanuatu Ltd | Operational | GSM 900 / UMTS 900 / LTE 700 | LTE band 28 |
| 541 | 07 | WanTok | WanTok Vanuatu Ltd | Operational | TD-LTE 2300 | LTE band 40 |

=== W ===
==== Wallis and Futuna – WF ====
| MCC | MNC | Brand | Operator | Status | Bands (MHz) | References and notes |
|---|---|---|---|---|---|---|
| 543 | 01 | Manuia | Service des Postes et Télécommunications des Îles Wallis et Futuna (SPT) | Operational | UMTS 900 / LTE | |

== See also ==
- List of mobile network operators of the Asia Pacific region
- List of LTE networks in Oceania
