= Mobile country code =

Number identifying a country in mobile networks

The ITU-T Recommendation E.212 defines mobile country codes (MCC) as well as mobile network codes (MNC).

The mobile country code consists of three decimal digits and the mobile network code consists of two or three decimal digits (for example: MNC of 001 is not the same as MNC of 01). The first digit of the mobile country code identifies the geographic region as follows (the digits 1 and 8 are not used):

- 0: Test networks
- 2: Europe
- 3: North America and the Caribbean
- 4: Asia and the Middle East
- 5: Australia and Oceania
- 6: Africa
- 7: South and Central America
- 9: Worldwide (Satellite, Air—aboard aircraft, Maritime—aboard ships, Antarctica)

An MCC is used in combination with an MNC (a combination known as an "MCC/MNC tuple") to uniquely identify a mobile network operator (carrier) using the GSM (including GSM-R), UMTS, LTE, and 5G public land mobile networks. Some but not all CDMA, iDEN, and satellite mobile networks are identified with an MCC/MNC tuple as well. For WiMAX networks, a globally unique Broadband Operator ID can be derived from the MCC/MNC tuple. TETRA networks use the mobile country code from ITU-T Recommendation E.212 together with a 14-bit binary mobile network code (T-MNC) where only values between 0 and 9999 are used. However, a TETRA network may be assigned an E.212 network code as well. Some network operators do not have their own radio access network at all. These are called mobile virtual network operators (MVNO) and are marked in the tables as such. Note that MVNOs without their own MCC/MNC (that is, they share the MCC/MNC of their host network) are not listed here.

The following tables attempt to provide a complete list of mobile network operators. Country information, including ISO 3166-1 alpha-2 country codes is provided for completeness. Mostly for historical reasons, one E.212 MCC may correspond to multiple ISO country codes (e.g., MCC 362 corresponds to BQ, CW, and SX). Some operators also choose to use an MCC outside the geographic area that it was assigned to (e.g. Digicel uses the Jamaica MCC throughout the Caribbean). ITU-T updates an official list of mobile network codes in its Operational Bulletins which are published twice a month. ITU-T also publishes complete lists: as of January 2024 list issued on 15 November 2023 was current, having all MCC/MNC before 15 November 2023. The official list is often incomplete as national MNC authorities do not forward changes to the ITU in a timely manner. The official list does not provide additional details such as bands and technologies and may not list disputed territories such as Abkhazia or Kosovo.

== Test networks ==
| MCC | MNC | Brand | Operator | Status | Bands (MHz) | References and notes |
|---|---|---|---|---|---|---|
| 001 | 01 | TEST | Test network | Operational | any | |
| 001 | 001 | TEST | Test network | Operational | any | |
| 999 | 99 | | Internal use | Operational | any | Internal use in private networks, no roaming |
| 999 | 999 | | Internal use | Operational | any | Internal use in private networks, no roaming |

== National operators ==
| Mobile country code | Country | ISO 3166 | Mobile network codes | National MNC authority | Remarks |
|---|---|---|---|---|---|
| 289 | === A === Abkhazia | GE-AB | List of mobile network codes in Abkhazia | | MCC is not listed by ITU |
| 412 | Afghanistan | AF | List of mobile network codes in Afghanistan | | |
| 276 | Albania | AL | List of mobile network codes in Albania | | |
| 603 | Algeria | DZ | List of mobile network codes in Algeria | | |
| 544 | American Samoa (United States of America) | AS | List of mobile network codes in American Samoa | | |
| 213 | Andorra | AD | List of mobile network codes in Andorra | | |
| 631 | Angola | AO | List of mobile network codes in Angola | | |
| 365 | Anguilla (United Kingdom) | AI | List of mobile network codes in Anguilla | Public Utilities Commission (PUC) | |
| 344 | Antigua and Barbuda | AG | List of mobile network codes in Antigua and Barbuda | | |
| 722 | Argentina | AR | List of mobile network codes in Argentina | | |
| 283 | Armenia | AM | List of mobile network codes in Armenia | | |
| 363 | Aruba | AW | List of mobile network codes in Aruba | | |
| 505 | Australia | AU | List of mobile network codes in Australia | | |
| 232 | Austria | AT | List of mobile network codes in Austria | Rundfunk- und Telekom Regulierungs-GmbH (RTR-GmbH) | |
| 400 | Azerbaijan | AZ | List of mobile network codes in Azerbaijan | | |
| 364 | === B === Bahamas | BS | List of mobile network codes in Bahamas | Utilities Regulation & Competition Authority (URCA) | |
| 426 | Bahrain | BH | List of mobile network codes in Bahrain | | |
| 470 | Bangladesh | BD | List of mobile network codes in Bangladesh | Bangladesh Telecommunication Regulatory Commission | |
| 342 | Barbados | BB | List of mobile network codes in Barbados | | |
| 257 | Belarus | BY | List of mobile network codes in Belarus | | |
| 206 | Belgium | BE | List of mobile network codes in Belgium | Belgian Institute for Postal services and Telecommunications (BIPT) | |
| 702 | Belize | BZ | List of mobile network codes in Belize | | |
| 616 | Benin | BJ | List of mobile network codes in Benin | | |
| 350 | Bermuda | BM | List of mobile network codes in Bermuda | | |
| 402 | Bhutan | BT | List of mobile network codes in Bhutan | | |
| 736 | Bolivia | BO | List of mobile network codes in Bolivia | | |
| 362 | Bonaire, Sint Eustatius and Saba | BQ | List of mobile network codes in the former Netherlands Antilles | | |
| 218 | Bosnia and Herzegovina | BA | List of mobile network codes in Bosnia and Herzegovina | | |
| 652 | Botswana | BW | List of mobile network codes in Botswana | Botswana Communications Regulatory Authority (BOCRA) | |
| 724 | Brazil | BR | List of mobile network codes in Brazil | | |
| 995 | British Indian Ocean Territory (United Kingdom) | IO | List of mobile networks in the British Indian Ocean Territory | | MCC is not listed by ITU |
| 348 | British Virgin Islands (United Kingdom) | VG | List of mobile network codes in the British Virgin Islands | | |
| 528 | Brunei | BN | List of mobile network codes in Brunei | | |
| 284 | Bulgaria | BG | List of mobile network codes in Bulgaria | Communications Regulation Commission (CRC) | |
| 613 | Burkina Faso | BF | List of mobile network codes in Burkina Faso | Autorité de régulation des communications électroniques et des postes (ARCEP) | |
| 642 | Burundi | BI | List of mobile network codes in Burundi | Agence de Régulation et de Contrôle des Télécommunications (ARCT) | |
| 456 | === C === Cambodia | KH | List of mobile network codes in Cambodia | | |
| 624 | Cameroon | CM | List of mobile network codes in Cameroon | | |
| 302 | Canada | CA | List of mobile network codes in Canada | Canadian Numbering Administrator | |
| 625 | Cape Verde | CV | List of mobile network codes in Cape Verde | | |
| 346 | Cayman Islands (United Kingdom) | KY | List of mobile network codes in the Cayman Islands | | |
| 623 | Central African Republic | CF | List of mobile network codes in the Central African Republic | | |
| 622 | Chad | TD | List of mobile network codes in Chad | | |
| 730 | Chile | CL | List of mobile network codes in Chile | | |
| 460 | China | CN | List of mobile network codes in China | | |
| 461 | China | CN | List of mobile network codes in China | | no networks yet |
| 732 | Colombia | CO | List of mobile network codes in Colombia | Comisión de Regulación de Comunicaciones (CRC) | |
| 654 | Comoros | KM | List of mobile network codes in Comoros | | |
| 629 | Congo | CG | List of mobile network codes in Congo | | |
| 548 | Cook Islands (Pacific Ocean) | CK | List of mobile network codes in the Cook Islands | | |
| 712 | Costa Rica | CR | List of mobile network codes in Costa Rica | | |
| 219 | Croatia | HR | List of mobile network codes in Croatia | Hrvatska agencija za poštu i elektroničke komunikacije (HAKOM) | |
| 368 | Cuba | CU | List of mobile network codes in Cuba | | |
| 362 | Curaçao | CW | List of mobile network codes in the former Netherlands Antilles | | |
| 280 | Cyprus | CY | List of mobile network codes in Cyprus | | |
| 230 | Czech Republic | CZ | List of mobile network codes in the Czech Republic | Czech Telecommunication Office / Český telekomunikační úřad (CTU) | |
| 630 | === D === Democratic Republic of the Congo | CD | List of mobile network codes in the Democratic Republic of the Congo | | |
| 238 | Denmark (Kingdom of Denmark) | DK | List of mobile network codes in Denmark | Agency for Digital Government / Digitaliseringsstyrelsen | |
| 638 | Djibouti | DJ | List of mobile network codes in Djibouti | | |
| 366 | Dominica | DM | List of mobile network codes in Dominica | | |
| 370 | Dominican Republic | DO | List of mobile network codes in the Dominican Republic | | |
| 514 | === E === East Timor | TL | List of mobile network codes in East Timor | | |
| 740 | Ecuador | EC | List of mobile network codes in Ecuador | | |
| 602 | Egypt | EG | List of mobile network codes in Egypt | | |
| 706 | El Salvador | SV | List of mobile network codes in El Salvador | Superintendencia General de Electricidad y Telecomunicaciones (SIGET) | |
| 627 | Equatorial Guinea | GQ | List of mobile network codes in Equatorial Guinea | | |
| 657 | Eritrea | ER | List of mobile network codes in Eritrea | | |
| 248 | Estonia | EE | List of mobile network codes in Estonia | | |
| 636 | Ethiopia | ET | List of mobile network codes in Ethiopia | | |
| 750 | === F === Falkland Islands (United Kingdom) | FK | List of mobile network codes in the Falkland Islands | | |
| 288 | Faroe Islands (Kingdom of Denmark) | FO | List of mobile network codes in the Faroe Islands | Faroese Telecommunications Authority / Fjarskiftiseftirlitið | |
| 542 | Fiji | FJ | List of mobile network codes in Fiji | | |
| 244 | Finland | FI | List of mobile network codes in Finland | Finnish Transport and Communications Agency / Liikenne- ja viestintävirasto (TRAFICOM) | |
| 208 | France | FR | List of mobile network codes in France | Autorité de Régulation des Communications Électroniques, des Postes et de la Distribution de la Presse (ARCEP) | |
| 742 | French Guiana (France) | GF | List of mobile network codes in French Guiana | Autorité de Régulation des Communications Électroniques, des Postes et de la Distribution de la Presse (ARCEP) | French Guiana shares MCC 340 in addition to using the assigned MCC 742 |
| 647 | French Indian Ocean Territories (France) | RE | List of mobile network codes in the French Indian Ocean Territories | Autorité de Régulation des Communications Électroniques, des Postes et de la Distribution de la Presse (ARCEP) | |
| 647 | French Indian Ocean Territories (France) | YT | List of mobile network codes in the French Indian Ocean Territories | Autorité de Régulation des Communications Électroniques, des Postes et de la Distribution de la Presse (ARCEP) | |
| 547 | French Polynesia (France) | PF | List of mobile network codes in French Polynesia | | |
| 628 | === G === Gabon | GA | List of mobile network codes in Gabon | | |
| 607 | Gambia | GM | List of mobile network codes in Gambia | | |
| 282 | Georgia | GE | List of mobile network codes in Georgia | | |
| 262 | Germany | DE | List of mobile network codes in Germany | Federal Network Agency / Bundesnetzagentur (BNetzA) | |
| 620 | Ghana | GH | List of mobile network codes in Ghana | National Communications Authority (NCA) | |
| 266 | Gibraltar (United Kingdom) | GI | List of mobile network codes in Gibraltar | | |
| 202 | Greece | GR | List of mobile network codes in Greece | | |
| 290 | Greenland (Kingdom of Denmark) | GL | List of mobile network codes in Greenland | | |
| 352 | Grenada | GD | List of mobile network codes in Grenada | | |
| 340 | Guadeloupe (France) | GP | List of mobile network codes in the French Antilles | Autorité de Régulation des Communications Électroniques, des Postes et de la Distribution de la Presse (ARCEP) | |
| 310 | Guam (United States of America) | GU | List of mobile network codes in Guam | IMSI Administrator | |
| 311 | Guam (United States of America) | GU | List of mobile network codes in Guam | IMSI Administrator | |
| 704 | Guatemala | GT | List of mobile network codes in Guatemala | | |
| 234 | Guernsey (United Kingdom) | GG | List of mobile network codes in Guernsey | Office of Communications (Ofcom) | |
| 611 | Guinea | GN | List of mobile network codes in Guinea | | |
| 632 | Guinea-Bissau | GW | List of mobile network codes in Guinea-Bissau | | |
| 738 | Guyana | GY | List of mobile network codes in Guyana | | |
| 372 | === H === Haiti | HT | List of mobile network codes in Haiti | | |
| 708 | Honduras | HN | List of mobile network codes in Honduras | | |
| 454 | Hong Kong | HK | List of mobile network codes in Hong Kong | | |
| 216 | Hungary | HU | List of mobile network codes in Hungary | National Media and Infocommunications Authority / Nemzeti Média- és Hírközlési Hatóság (NMHH) | |
| 274 | === I === Iceland | IS | List of mobile network codes in Iceland | Telecom Administration / Fjarskiptastofa | |
| 404 | India | IN | List of mobile network codes in India | | |
| 405 | India | IN | List of mobile network codes in India | | |
| 406 | India | IN | no networks yet | | |
| 510 | Indonesia | ID | List of mobile network codes in Indonesia | | |
| 432 | Iran | IR | List of mobile network codes in Iran | | |
| 418 | Iraq | IQ | List of mobile network codes in Iraq | | |
| 272 | Ireland | IE | List of mobile network codes in Ireland | | |
| 234 | Isle of Man (United Kingdom) | IM | List of mobile network codes in the Isle of Man | Office of Communications (Ofcom) | |
| 425 | Israel | IL | List of mobile network codes in Israel | | |
| 222 | Italy | IT | List of mobile network codes in Italy | | |
| 612 | Ivory Coast | CI | List of mobile network codes in Ivory Coast | | |
| 338 | === J === Jamaica | JM | List of mobile network codes in Jamaica | | |
| 440 | Japan | JP | List of mobile network codes in Japan | | |
| 441 | Japan | JP | List of mobile network codes in Japan | | |
| 234 | Jersey (United Kingdom) | JE | List of mobile network codes in Jersey | Office of Communications (Ofcom) | |
| 416 | Jordan | JO | List of mobile network codes in Jordan | | |
| 401 | === K === Kazakhstan | KZ | List of mobile network codes in Kazakhstan | | |
| 639 | Kenya | KE | List of mobile network codes in Kenya | Communications Authority of Kenya (CA) | |
| 545 | Kiribati | KI | List of mobile network codes in Kiribati | | |
| 467 | Korea, North | KP | List of mobile network codes in North Korea | | |
| 450 | Korea, South | KR | List of mobile network codes in South Korea | | |
| 221 | Kosovo | RS-KM | List of mobile network codes in Kosovo | | |
| 419 | Kuwait | KW | List of mobile network codes in Kuwait | | |
| 437 | Kyrgyzstan | KG | List of mobile network codes in Kyrgyzstan | | |
| 457 | === L === Laos | LA | List of mobile network codes in Laos | | |
| 247 | Latvia | LV | List of mobile network codes in Latvia | Public Utilities Commission / Sabiedrisko pakalpojumu regulēšanas komisija (SPRK) | |
| 415 | Lebanon | LB | List of mobile network codes in Lebanon | | |
| 651 | Lesotho | LS | List of mobile network codes in Lesotho | | |
| 618 | Liberia | LR | List of mobile network codes in Liberia | | |
| 606 | Libya | LY | List of mobile network codes in Libya | | |
| 295 | Liechtenstein | LI | List of mobile network codes in Liechtenstein | Office for Communications / Amt für Kommunikation (AK) | |
| 246 | Lithuania | LT | List of mobile network codes in Lithuania | Communications Regulatory Authority / Ryšių Reguliavimo Tarnyba (RRT) | |
| 270 | Luxembourg | LU | List of mobile network codes in Luxembourg | | |
| 455 | === M === Macau | MO | List of mobile network codes in Macau | | |
| 294 | North Macedonia | MK | List of mobile network codes in North Macedonia | | |
| 646 | Madagascar | MG | List of mobile network codes in Madagascar | | |
| 650 | Malawi | MW | List of mobile network codes in Malawi | | |
| 502 | Malaysia | MY | List of mobile network codes in Malaysia | Malaysian Communications and Multimedia Commission / Suruhanjaya Komunikasi dan Multimedia Malaysia (SKMM) | |
| 472 | Maldives | MV | List of mobile network codes in the Maldives | | |
| 610 | Mali | ML | List of mobile network codes in Mali | | |
| 278 | Malta | MT | List of mobile network codes in Malta | | |
| 551 | Marshall Islands | MH | List of mobile network codes in the Marshall Islands | | |
| 340 | Martinique (France) | MQ | List of mobile network codes in the French Antilles | Autorité de Régulation des Communications Électroniques, des Postes et de la Distribution de la Presse (ARCEP) | |
| 609 | Mauritania | MR | List of mobile network codes in Mauritania | | |
| 617 | Mauritius | MU | List of mobile network codes in Mauritius | | |
| 334 | Mexico | MX | List of mobile network codes in Mexico | Instituto Federal de Telecomunicaciones | |
| 550 | Micronesia, Federated States of | FM | List of mobile network codes in the Federated States of Micronesia | | |
| 259 | Moldova | MD | List of mobile network codes in Moldova | | |
| 212 | Monaco | MC | List of mobile network codes in Monaco | | |
| 428 | Mongolia | MN | List of mobile network codes in Mongolia | | |
| 297 | Montenegro | ME | List of mobile network codes in Montenegro | | |
| 354 | Montserrat (United Kingdom) | MS | List of mobile network codes in Montserrat | | |
| 604 | Morocco | MA | List of mobile network codes in Morocco | | |
| 643 | Mozambique | MZ | List of mobile network codes in Mozambique | | |
| 414 | Myanmar | MM | List of mobile network codes in Myanmar | | |
| 649 | === N === Namibia | NA | List of mobile network codes in Namibia | | |
| 536 | Nauru | NR | List of mobile network codes in Nauru | | |
| 429 | Nepal | NP | List of mobile network codes in Nepal | Nepal Telecommunications Authority | |
| 204 | Netherlands (Kingdom of the Netherlands) | NL | List of mobile network codes in the Netherlands | | |
| 546 | New Caledonia | NC | List of mobile network codes in New Caledonia | | |
| 530 | New Zealand | NZ | List of mobile network codes in New Zealand | | |
| 710 | Nicaragua | NI | List of mobile network codes in Nicaragua | | |
| 614 | Niger | NE | List of mobile network codes in Niger | | |
| 621 | Nigeria | NG | List of mobile network codes in Nigeria | | |
| 555 | Niue | NU | List of mobile network codes in Niue | | |
| 505 | Norfolk Island | NF | List of mobile network codes in Norfolk Island | | |
| 310 | Northern Mariana Islands (United States of America) | MP | List of mobile network codes in the Northern Mariana Islands | IMSI Administrator | |
| 242 | Norway | NO | List of mobile network codes in Norway | Norwegian Communications Authority / Nasjonal kommunikasjonsmyndighet (NKOM) | |
| 422 | === O === Oman | OM | List of mobile network codes in Oman | | |
| 410 | === P === Pakistan | PK | List of mobile network codes in Pakistan | | |
| 552 | Palau | PW | List of mobile network codes in Palau | | |
| 425 | Palestine | PS | List of mobile network codes in Palestine | | Uses the MCC of Israel |
| 714 | Panama | PA | List of mobile network codes in Panama | | |
| 537 | Papua New Guinea | PG | List of mobile network codes in Papua New Guinea | | |
| 744 | Paraguay | PY | List of mobile network codes in Paraguay | | |
| 716 | Peru | PE | List of mobile network codes in Peru | | |
| 515 | Philippines | PH | List of mobile network codes in the Philippines | | |
| 260 | Poland | PL | List of mobile network codes in Poland | Office of Electronic Communications / Urząd Komunikacji Elektronicznej (UKE) | |
| 268 | Portugal | PT | List of mobile network codes in Portugal | National Communications Authority / Autoridade Nacional de Comunicações (ANACOM) | |
| 330 | Puerto Rico (United States of America) | PR | List of mobile network codes in Puerto Rico | | Puerto Rico shares US MCCs in addition to using the assigned MCC 330 |
| 427 | === Q === Qatar | QA | List of mobile network codes in Qatar | | |
| 226 | === R === Romania | RO | List of mobile network codes in Romania | | |
| 250 | Russian Federation | RU | List of mobile network codes in the Russian Federation | | |
| 635 | Rwanda | RW | List of mobile network codes in Rwanda | Rwanda Utilities Regulatory Agency (RURA) / Agence Rwandaise de Régulation | |
| 340 | === S === Saint Barthélemy (France) | BL | List of mobile network codes in the French Antilles | Autorité de Régulation des Communications Électroniques, des Postes et de la Distribution de la Presse (ARCEP) | |
| 658 | Saint Helena, Ascension and Tristan da Cunha | SH | List of mobile network codes in Saint Helena, Ascension and Tristan da Cunha | | |
| 356 | Saint Kitts and Nevis | KN | List of mobile network codes in Saint Kitts and Nevis | | |
| 358 | Saint Lucia | LC | List of mobile network codes in Saint Lucia | | |
| 340 | Saint Martin (France) | MF | List of mobile network codes in the French Antilles | Autorité de Régulation des Communications Électroniques, des Postes et de la Distribution de la Presse (ARCEP) | |
| 308 | Saint Pierre and Miquelon | PM | List of mobile network codes in Saint Pierre and Miquelon | Autorité de Régulation des Communications Électroniques, des Postes et de la Distribution de la Presse (ARCEP) | |
| 360 | Saint Vincent and the Grenadines | VC | List of mobile network codes in Saint Vincent and the Grenadines | | |
| 549 | Samoa | WS | List of mobile network codes in Samoa | | |
| 292 | San Marino | SM | List of mobile network codes in San Marino | | |
| 626 | São Tomé and Príncipe | ST | List of mobile network codes in São Tomé and Príncipe | | |
| 420 | Saudi Arabia | SA | List of mobile network codes in Saudi Arabia | | |
| 608 | Senegal | SN | List of mobile network codes in Senegal | | |
| 220 | Serbia | RS | List of mobile network codes in Serbia | Regulatory Agency for Electronic Communications and Postal Services / Regulatorna agencija za elektronske komunikacije i poštanske usluge (RATEL) | |
| 633 | Seychelles | SC | List of mobile network codes in the Seychelles | Seychelles Communications Regulatory Authority (SCRA) | |
| 619 | Sierra Leone | SL | List of mobile network codes in Sierra Leone | | |
| 525 | Singapore | SG | List of mobile network codes in Singapore | Info-communications Media Development Authority (IMDA) | |
| 362 | Sint Maarten | SX | List of mobile network codes in the former Netherlands Antilles | | |
| 231 | Slovakia | SK | List of mobile network codes in Slovakia | Regulatory for Electronic Communications and Postal Services / Úrad pre reguláciu elektronických komunikácií a poštových služieb | |
| 293 | Slovenia | SI | List of mobile network codes in Slovenia | Agency for communication networks and services / Agencija za komunikacijska omrežja in storitve (AKOS) | |
| 540 | Solomon Islands | SB | List of mobile network codes in the Solomon Islands | | |
| 637 | Somalia | SO | List of mobile network codes in Somalia | | |
| 655 | South Africa | ZA | List of mobile network codes in South Africa | | |
| 659 | South Sudan | SS | List of mobile network codes in South Sudan | | |
| 214 | Spain | ES | List of mobile network codes in Spain | | |
| 413 | Sri Lanka | LK | List of mobile network codes in Sri Lanka | Telecommunications Regulatory Commission of Sri Lanka (TRCSL) | |
| 634 | Sudan | SD | List of mobile network codes in Sudan | | |
| 746 | Suriname | SR | List of mobile network codes in Suriname | | |
| 653 | Swaziland | SZ | List of mobile network codes in Swaziland | | |
| 240 | Sweden | SE | List of mobile network codes in Sweden | Swedish Post and Telecom Authority / Post- och telestyrelsen (PTS) | |
| 228 | Switzerland | CH | List of mobile network codes in Switzerland | Federal Office of Communications / Office fédéral de la communication (OFCOM) / Bundesamt für Kommunikation (BAKOM) | |
| 417 | Syria | SY | List of mobile network codes in Syria | | |
| 466 | === T === Taiwan | TW | List of mobile network codes in Taiwan | National Communications Commission (NCC) | |
| 436 | Tajikistan | TJ | List of mobile network codes in Tajikistan | | |
| 640 | Tanzania | TZ | List of mobile network codes in Tanzania | Tanzania Communications Regulatory Authority (TCRA) | |
| 520 | Thailand | TH | List of mobile network codes in Thailand | National Broadcasting and Telecommunications Commission (NBTC) | |
| 615 | Togo | TG | List of mobile network codes in Togo | | |
| 554 | Tokelau | TK | List of mobile network codes in Tokelau | | |
| 539 | Tonga | TO | List of mobile network codes in Tonga | | |
| 374 | Trinidad and Tobago | TT | List of mobile network codes in Trinidad and Tobago | Telecommunications Authority of Trinidad and Tobago (TATT) | |
| 605 | Tunisia | TN | List of mobile network codes in Tunisia | | |
| 286 | Turkey | TR | List of mobile network codes in Turkey | | |
| 438 | Turkmenistan | TM | List of mobile network codes in Turkmenistan | | |
| 376 | Turks and Caicos Islands | TC | List of mobile network codes in the Turks and Caicos Islands | | |
| 553 | Tuvalu | TV | List of mobile network codes in Tuvalu | | |
| 641 | === U === Uganda | UG | List of mobile network codes in Uganda | | |
| 255 | Ukraine | UA | List of mobile network codes in Ukraine | National Commission for the State Regulation of Communications and Information (NKRZI) | |
| 424 | United Arab Emirates | AE | List of mobile network codes in the United Arab Emirates | | |
| 430 | United Arab Emirates (Abu Dhabi) | AE | no networks yet | | |
| 431 | United Arab Emirates (Dubai) | AE | no networks yet | | |
| 234 | United Kingdom | GB | List of mobile network codes in the United Kingdom | Office of Communications (Ofcom) | |
| 235 | United Kingdom | GB | List of mobile network codes in the United Kingdom | Office of Communications (Ofcom) | |
| 310 | United States of America | US | List of mobile network codes in the United States of America | IMSI Administrator | |
| 311 | United States of America | US | List of mobile network codes in the United States of America | IMSI Administrator | |
| 312 | United States of America | US | List of mobile network codes in the United States of America | IMSI Administrator | |
| 313 | United States of America | US | List of mobile network codes in the United States of America | IMSI Administrator | |
| 314 | United States of America | US | List of mobile network codes in the United States of America | IMSI Administrator | |
| 315 | United States of America | US | List of mobile network codes in the United States of America | IMSI Administrator | |
| 316 | United States of America | US | List of mobile network codes in the United States of America | IMSI Administrator | |
| 332 | United States Virgin Islands | VI | List of mobile network codes in the United States Virgin Islands | IMSI Administrator | The US Virgin Islands share the US MCCs instead of using the assigned MCC 332 |
| 748 | Uruguay | UY | List of mobile network codes in Uruguay | | |
| 434 | Uzbekistan | UZ | List of mobile network codes in the Uzbekistan | | |
| 541 | === V === Vanuatu | VU | List of mobile network codes in Vanuatu | | |
| 734 | Venezuela | VE | List of mobile network codes in Venezuela | | |
| 452 | Vietnam | VN | List of mobile network codes in the Vietnam | | |
| 543 | === W === Wallis and Futuna | WF | List of mobile network codes in Wallis and Futuna | | |
| 421 | === Y === Yemen | YE | List of mobile network codes in the Yemen | | |
| 645 | === Z === Zambia | ZM | List of mobile network codes in Zambia | | |
| 648 | Zimbabwe | ZW | List of mobile network codes in Zimbabwe | | |

== International operators ==
| MCC | MNC | Brand | Operator | Status | Bands (MHz) | References and notes |
|---|---|---|---|---|---|---|
| 901 | 01 | | Webbing | Unknown | MVNO | Former ICO Satellite Management |
| 901 | 02 | | GlobalmatiX AG | Unknown | Unknown | Former Sense Communications International; vehicle IoT solutions |
| 901 | 03 | Iridium | | Operational | Satellite | |
| 901 | 04 | | BBIX Singapore Pte. Ltd. | Unknown | Unknown | Former Globalstar |
| 901 | 05 | | Thuraya RMSS Network | Operational | Satellite | |
| 901 | 06 | | Thuraya Satellite Telecommunications Company | Operational | Satellite | |
| 901 | 07 | | NTT Ltd. | Unknown | Unknown | Former Ellipso |
| 901 | 08 | | SpaceX | Unknown | Unknown | Formerly: GSM, reserved for station identification where the mobile does not have a subscription IMSI |
| 901 | 09 | | China Telecommunications Corporation | Unknown | Unknown | Formerly: Tele1 Europe |
| 901 | 10 | | Omnispace LLC | Unknown | Satellite | Former ACeS |
| 901 | 11 | Inmarsat | | Operational | Satellite | |
| 901 | 12 | Telenor | Telenor Maritime AS | Operational | GSM 1800 / LTE 800 | Maritime; formerly Maritime Communications Partner (MCP) |
| 901 | 13 | GSM.AQ | BebbiCell AG | Not operational | GSM 1800 | Antarctica +88234 Network; formerly Global Networks Switzerland Inc.; MNC withdrawn |
| 901 | 14 | AeroMobile | AeroMobile AS | Operational | GSM 1800 | Air |
| 901 | 15 | OnAir | SITAONAIR | Not operational | GSM 1800 | Air; MNC withdrawn |
| 901 | 16 | Cisco Jasper | Cisco Systems, Inc. | Operational | Unknown | |
| 901 | 17 | Navitas | JT Group Limited | Not operational | GSM 1800 | Maritime; shut down in 2009 |
| 901 | 18 | WMS | Wireless Maritime Services, LLC | Operational | GSM 900 / GSM 1900 / CDMA2000 1900 / UMTS 1900 / LTE 700 | Former Cellular at Sea, Cingular, AT&T; maritime |
| 901 | 19 | Epic Maritime | Monaco Telecom | Operational | GSM 900 / GSM 1800 / UMTS 2100 | Maritime |
| 901 | 20 | | Intermatica | Not operational | Unknown | MNC withdrawn |
| 901 | 21 | | Wins Limited | Not operational | GSM 1800 | Maritime; formerly Seanet Maritime Communications; MNC withdrawn |
| 901 | 22 | | MediaLincc Ltd | Not operational | Unknown | MNC withdrawn |
| 901 | 23 | | Bloxtel Inc. | Unknown | 5G | Former Beeline; private networks |
| 901 | 24 | iNum | Voxbone | Not operational | Unknown | +883 iNum; MNC withdrawn |
| 901 | 25 | | Datora Mobile Telecomunicações SA | Not operational | MVNO | Formerly In & phone; MNC withdrawn |
| 901 | 26 | TIM@sea | Telecom Italia Mobile | Operational | GSM 1800 / GSM 1900 | Maritime |
| 901 | 27 | OnMarine | Monaco Telecom | Not operational | GSM 1800 | Maritime; MNC withdrawn |
| 901 | 28 | Vodafone | GDSP (Vodafone's Global Data Service Platform) | Operational | Roaming SIM | |
| 901 | 29 | Myriota | Myriota PTY | Operational | Satellite 5G | Former Telenor; IoT applications |
| 901 | 30 | | OQ Technology | Unknown | Satellite 5G | Formerly: Terrestar Networks |
| 901 | 31 | Orange | Orange S.A. | Operational | GSM 900 | |
| 901 | 32 | Sky High | MegaFon | Not operational | GSM 900 | Air (Aeroflot); MNC withdrawn |
| 901 | 33 | | Onomondo ApS | Unknown | MVNO | Former Smart Communications; IoT |
| 901 | 34 | | tyntec GmbH | Unknown | MVNO | |
| 901 | 35 | | Globecomm Network Services | Not operational | GSM 850 | Maritime; MNC withdrawn |
| 901 | 36 | | Azerfon | Not operational | GSM 1800 | Air; MNC withdrawn |
| 901 | 37 | | Transatel | Operational | MVNO | Global SIM for Data Mobile Broadband and M2M |
| 901 | 38 | | Multiregional TransitTelecom (MTT) | Not operational | MVNO | MNC withdrawn |
| 901 | 39 | | MTX Connect Ltd | Operational | MVNO | |
| 901 | 40 | 1NCE | Deutsche Telekom AG | Operational | MVNO | |
| 901 | 41 | | One Network B.V. | Operational | MVNO | Former BodyTrace Netherlands B.V. |
| 901 | 42 | | Net Feasa Limited | Unknown | Unknown | Former DCN Hub, IMC Island; marine IoT applications |
| 901 | 43 | | EMnify GmbH | Operational | MVNO | |
| 901 | 44 | | AT&T Inc. | Unknown | Unknown | |
| 901 | 45 | | Advanced Wireless Network Company Limited | Unknown | Unknown | subsidiary of Advanced Info Service |
| 901 | 46 | | Telecom26 AG | Operational | MVNO | |
| 901 | 47 | SFR | Société française du radiotéléphone | Unknown | Unknown | Former Ooredoo |
| 901 | 48 | Com4 | Communication for Devices in Sweden AB | Unknown | Unknown | |
| 901 | 49 | Zain | Mobile Telecommunications Company K.S.C.P. | Unknown | Unknown | |
| 901 | 50 | | EchoStar Mobile | Unknown | Satellite | Also listed as Sawatch Limited |
| 901 | 51 | | Ligado Networks Subsidiary LLC | Unknown | Satellite | Former VisionNG |
| 901 | 52 | | Manx Telecom Trading Ltd. | Unknown | Unknown | |
| 901 | 53 | European Aviation Network | Inmarsat Ltd. | Operational | LTE 2100 | Former Deutsche Telekom; LTE band 65; ground-based network for aircraft |
| 901 | 54 | | Teleena Holding B.V. | Unknown | Unknown | |
| 901 | 55 | | Beezz Communication Solutions Ltd. | Not operational | Unknown | MNC withdrawn |
| 901 | 56 | ETSI | European Telecommunications Standards Institute | Unknown | Unknown | |
| 901 | 57 | | AST SpaceMobile | Unknown | Satellite | Former SAP |
| 901 | 58 | BICS | Belgacom ICS SA | Unknown | Unknown | |
| 901 | 59 | | Bird B.V. | Unknown | Unknown | Former MessageBird |
| 901 | 60 | | OneWeb | Unknown | Unknown | |
| 901 | 61 | | MTN Management Services | Unknown | Unknown | |
| 901 | 62 | | KORE Wireless | Operational | Unknown | Former Twilio |
| 901 | 63 | | Beamlink, Inc. | Unknown | LTE / 5G | Former GloTel B.V. |
| 901 | 64 | | Syniverse Technologies, LLC | Unknown | Unknown | |
| 901 | 65 | | SIMpracy LTD | Unknown | MVNO | Former Plintron |
| 901 | 66 | | Limitless Mobile LLC | Operational | LTE | |
| 901 | 67 | | 1NCE GmbH | Operational | MVNO | IoT solutions |
| 901 | 68 | | Maersk Line A/S | Unknown | Unknown | |
| 901 | 69 | | Legos | Unknown | Unknown | |
| 901 | 70 | | Bureau 1440 LLC | Unknown | Satellite | Former Clementvale Baltic OÜ |
| 901 | 71 | | Tampnet AS | Unknown | Unknown | |
| 901 | 72 | | Tele2 Sverige Aktiebolag | Not operational | Unknown | Former Tele2 IoT; MNC withdrawn |
| 901 | 73 | | Cubic Telecom Limited | Unknown | Unknown | |
| 901 | 74 | | Etisalat | Unknown | Unknown | |
| 901 | 75 | | Giesecke+Devrient | Operational | MVNO | IoT solutions; former Podsystem Ltd. |
| 901 | 76 | | A1 Telekom Austria AG | Unknown | Unknown | |
| 901 | 77 | | Bouygues Telecom | Unknown | Unknown | |
| 901 | 78 | | Telecom Italia Sparkle S.p.A. | Unknown | Unknown | |
| 901 | 79 | | Nokia Corporation | Unknown | Unknown | |
| 901 | 80 | | Flo Live Limited | Unknown | MVNO | IoT solutions |
| 901 | 81 | | Airnity SAS | Unknown | MVNO | IoT solutions |
| 901 | 82 | | Eseye Limited | Unknown | MVNO | IoT solutions |
| 901 | 83 | | iBasis Netherlands BV | Unknown | Unknown | |
| 901 | 84 | | Telefónica Móviles España, S.A. Unipersonal | Unknown | Unknown | |
| 901 | 85 | | Telefónica Germany GmbH & Co. OHG | Unknown | Unknown | |
| 901 | 86 | | BJT Partners SAS | Unknown | Unknown | |
| 901 | 87 | | Cisco Systems, Inc. | Unknown | Unknown | |
| 901 | 88 | | Bondio Limited | Unknown | Unknown | Former OCHA |
| 901 | 89 | | DIDWW Ireland Limited | Operational | MVNO | |
| 901 | 90 | | Truphone Limited | Not operational | MVNO | MNC withdrawn |
| 901 | 91 | | World Mobile Group Limited | Unknown | Unknown | |
| 901 | 92 | | Phonegroup SA | Unknown | Unknown | |
| 901 | 93 | | SkyFive AG | Unknown | Unknown | split off from Nokia; ground-based networks for aircraft |
| 901 | 94 | | Intelsat US LLC | Unknown | Satellite | |
| 901 | 95 | | HMD Global Oy | Not operational | Unknown | MNC withdrawn |
| 901 | 96 | | KORE Wireless | Unknown | Unknown | IoT solutions |
| 901 | 97 | | Satelio IoT Services S.L. | Unknown | Satellite | IoT solutions |
| 901 | 98 | | Skylo | Operational | Satellite 5G 1600 | |
| 901 | 99 | | Athalos Global Services BV | Not operational | MVNO | MNC withdrawn |
| 902 | 01 | | MulteFire Alliance | Operational | LTE | |
| 991 | 01 | | World's Global Telecom | Not operational | Unknown | temporarily assigned until 15 January 2021 |
| 991 | 02 | 5G Croco | Orange S.A. | Not operational | 5G | temporarily assigned until 6 August 2022 |
| 991 | 03 | | Halys SAS | Not operational | Unknown | temporary assignment for trial until 5 April 2022; MNC withdrawn |
| 991 | 04 | | E-Space Inc. | Not operational | Satellite | temporary assignment for trial until 17 Oct 2026; MNC withdrawn |

=== British Indian Ocean Territory (United Kingdom) – IO ===
| MCC | MNC | Brand | Operator | Status | Bands (MHz) | References and notes |
|---|---|---|---|---|---|---|
| 995 | 01 | FonePlus | Sure (Diego Garcia) Ltd | Operational | GSM 900 | There appears to be no officially assigned MCC |

== See also ==
- Mobile Network Codes in ITU region 2xx (Europe)
- Mobile Network Codes in ITU region 3xx (North America)
- Mobile Network Codes in ITU region 4xx (Asia)
- Mobile Network Codes in ITU region 5xx (Oceania)
- Mobile Network Codes in ITU region 6xx (Africa)
- Mobile Network Codes in ITU region 7xx (South America)
- List of mobile network operators
- List of UMTS networks
- List of LTE networks
- LTE frequency bands
- List of 5G NR networks
- List of CDMA2000 networks
- List of iDEN networks
- List of WiMAX networks
- PLMN
