= Pacific Telecommunications Council =

American industry trade association

- Established: 1979
- Type: trade association
- Registration no.: 99-0200235
- Legal status: non-profit
- Location: Honolulu, Hawaiʻi, United States
- Region served: Pacific Rim
- Key people: Brian Moon (CEO)
- Website: ptc.org

Pacific Telecommunications Council (PTC) is a global non-profit organization dedicated to supporting collaboration and innovation in the telecommunications and ICT industries. PTC works to create opportunities for advancing communications and digital infrastructure in the Pacific region and around the world. The organization is recognized as a platform for industry dialogue, research, and professional development.

== History ==
PTC was conceptualized in 1977 and officially established as a non-profit in 1980. Its inaugural conference, co-sponsored by the IEEE (Institute of Electrical and Electronics Engineers), was held in 1978, followed by the formal creation of PTC following in 1979. Early supporters included IEEE, the University of Hawaii, Hawaiian Telephone Company, and the Alaska Office of Telecommunications. The organization is headquartered in Honolulu, Hawaiʻi.

PTC was founded to facilitate the exchange of ideas and policies among industry, academia, and government. In 1986, the United States Information Agency began providing funding to the PTC, enabling greater participation from telecommunications professionals from developing Pacific Rim countries. Over time, PTC has broadened its focus to include emerging technologies like fiber optics, satellite communications, and subsea cable networks. Today, its mission includes advancing global connectivity and promoting sustainability in the digital era.

== PTC Annual Conference ==
The PTC Annual Conference is the organization’s flagship event, held annually each January in Honolulu, Hawai’i. The next Annual Conference will be held January 18-21, 2026. Recognized as a major gathering for telecommunications and ICT professionals, the event marked its 47th anniversary in January 2025.

The conference is a hub for networking, knowledge sharing, and exploring business opportunities. It features high-profile keynote speakers and panels on emerging technologies and market trends, as well as workshops and training sessions. The PTC Annual Conference is recognized as a must-attend event in the telecommunications industry, connecting leaders across digital infrastructure and ICT sectors and providing a platform to discuss emerging trends and global connectivity challenges. The conference is a hub for networking, knowledge sharing, and exploring business opportunities. Additionally, the event has included sessions on sustainable digital infrastructure and regulatory frameworks in its panels.
