= SotelTchad =

Societe des Telecommunications Internationales du Tchad (SotelTchad) is a Chadian telecommunications parastatal providing landline domestic and international telephone service, as well as Internet service. SotelTchad was created in 2000, when domestic phone services were detached from the postal service. The government initially stated its intention to privatize the parastatal through international bidding, but this was put on hold. Company advertisements in late 2000 stated that there were 10,260 telephones and 1,020 Internet subscribers in the country. In 2001, SotelTchad agreed to a partnership with ITXC to provide international phone service via Internet telephony However, by 2005 cellphone users on private networks vastly outnumbered the users of landlines. Privatized in 2010 and sold to the Libyan company Lap Green, the Chadian state subsequently regained control of the company.
