= Expresso Telecom =

Expresso is an African telecommunications services company. It provides telecommunication services in three African markets: Mauritania, Senegal, Sudan. Expresso is a key player in the implementation of the Africa Coast to Europe (ACE) submarine cable. Sudatel owns 75% of the total Expresso shares.

In 2006, Mauritania's Chinguitel was Expresso's first ‘green field’ operation, acquiring a licence to operate as a telecom operator. Sudatel share in Chinguitel is 68%.

By August 2007, Chinguitel established a CDMA network, providing full coverage across the country.

In November 2007, Expresso Senegal became Expresso's second ‘green field’ operation, licensed to operate as a telecom operator in Senegal. Sudatel share is Expresso Senegal is 75%.

In July 2008, Expresso Telecom acquired 100% of Ghana's Kasapa Telecom Company. Sudatel share in this company is 75%. As of April 2016, 18% of Expresso Ghana (Kasapa Telecom Limited) were sold to an unidentified buyer for $US5M. The remainder of the shares were transferred to an escrow agent.

In December 2008, Expresso Telecom acquired 70% of Nigeria's Intercellular and currently the company only provides fixed wireless services. In 2009, Expresso was able to obtain an additional CDMA carrier, resulting in four CDMA carriers with nationwide coverage.

It's worth to mention that both Sudatel then led by Emad Hussein, Abdelaziz Osman & Eihab Osman, and Intercellular Nigeria Plc led by Arvid Knutsun and Bashir El-rufai have refused to pay the agreed upon commission for Azzam Resources "the company who brought both of them together" the company sued them and the case was in the court .

In January 2009, Expresso Senegal launched its commercial operations providing voice, fixed wireless and high-speed data services over a CDMA network across the nation.

In June 2010 Expresso Senegal launched a GSM network; the only operator providing 3G services for the very first time to the people of Senegal. Expresso Senegal provides wireless broadband internet across Senegal.

Expresso acquired 100% ownership of Intercel Guinee SA, a company engaged in providing telecommunication services in Guinea in early 2012.

In 2023, it is the third-largest mobile operator in Senegal with a market share of 17.18%.
