= Blu Telecommunications =

- Type: Telecommunication Service Provider
- Headquarters: Accra, Ghana
- Official language: English
- Chief Executive: Emmanuel Collison
- Key people: Ekow Thompson(Chief operations officer), Anthony Getor(Chief Technical officer), Sampson Narteh-Yoe(Chief Finance Officer), Prosper Harrison Addo, Esq.(Head, Legal & Corporate Affairs) and Ohenewaa Appiah(Human Resource Manager)
- Website: www.blu.com.gh

Blu Telecommunications is a Ghanaian-owned telecommunications company, one of the newest telecommunications companies in Ghana that were awarded the rights to provide 4G LTE in the country. It started its commercialization in October 2014 with coverage in some selected parts of the country: Accra and Tema.
