= BusyInternet =

Ghanaian internet service provider

Coordinates: 5.571497°N 0.209516°W

- Company type: Private
- Industry: Telecommunications
- Founded: 2001
- Headquarters: Accra, Ghana
- Area served: Accra, Tema
- Products: ADSL Broadband Services Data Hosting Internet café
- Website: www.busyinternet.com

Busy Internet is a Ghanaian Internet service provider (ISP) providing a number of services including ADSL broadband, data hosting and Internet café in Ghana.

== History ==
BusyInternet was founded in 2001. It is located at Ring Road East in Accra.

== Services ==
- ADSL broadband
- Data hosting
- Internet café
