= Mobile network codes in ITU region 2xx (Europe) =

This list contains the mobile country codes (MCC) and mobile network codes (MNC) for networks with country codes between 200 and 299, inclusive. This range covers Europe, as well as: the Asian parts of the Russian Federation and Turkey; Georgia; Armenia; Greenland; the Azores and Madeira as parts of Portugal; and the Canary Islands as part of Spain.

== National operators ==
=== A ===
==== Abkhazia – GE-AB ====
MCC	MNC	Brand	Operator	Status	Bands (MHz)	References and notes
289	67	Aquafon	Aquafon JSC	Operational	GSM 900 / GSM 1800 / UMTS 2100 / LTE 800	MCC is not listed by ITU; LTE band 20
289	88	A-Mobile	A-Mobile LLSC	Operational	GSM 900 / GSM 1800 / UMTS 2100 / LTE 800 / LTE 1800	MCC is not listed by ITU

==== Albania – AL ====
MCC	MNC	Brand	Operator	Status	Bands (MHz)	References and notes
276	01	ONE	One Albania	Operational	GSM 900 / GSM 1800 / UMTS 2100 / LTE 1800 / LTE 2600	Former One Telecommunications, Telekom Albania, AMC
276	02	Vodafone	Vodafone Albania	Operational	GSM 900 / GSM 1800 / UMTS 2100 / LTE 1800 / LTE 2600	
276	03	ALBtelecom	Albtelecom	Not operational	GSM 900 / GSM 1800 / UMTS 2100 / LTE 1800	Former Eagle Mobile; merged with One Albania in Mar 2023
276	04	Plus Communication	Plus Communication	Not operational	GSM 900 / GSM 1800 / UMTS 2100	Shut down Jan 2018; MNC withdrawn

==== Andorra – AD ====
MCC	MNC	Brand	Operator	Status	Bands (MHz)	References and notes
213	03	Som, Mobiland	Andorra Telecom	Operational	GSM 900 / GSM 1800 / UMTS 2100 / LTE 800 / LTE 1800 / 5G	LTE band 20; former Servei de Telecommunicacions d'Andorra

==== Armenia – AM ====
MCC	MNC	Brand	Operator	Status	Bands (MHz)	References and notes
283	01	Team	Telecom Armenia	Operational	GSM 900 / GSM 1800 / UMTS 2100 / LTE 450 / LTE 1800	Formerly named Beeline. Rebranded to Team Telecom in April 2022.
283	04	Karabakh Telecom	Karabakh Telecom	Not operational	GSM 900 / UMTS 900	Down since the beginning of the 2023 Azerbaijani offensive in Nagorno-Karabakh. All numbers that begins with +37497 were moved to the Team Telecom Armenia network also provided with free service for 6 months.
283	05	Viva Armenia	K Telecom CJSC	Operational	GSM 900 / GSM 1800 / UMTS 2100 / LTE 2600 / 5G 800	
283	10	Ucom	Ucom LLC	Operational	GSM 900 / GSM 1800 / UMTS 900 / UMTS 2100 / LTE 800 / LTE 1800 / LTE 2600	Former Orange

==== Austria – AT ====
MCC	MNC	Brand	Operator	Status	Bands (MHz)	References and notes
232	01	A1.net	A1 Telekom Austria	Operational	GSM 900 / LTE 800 / LTE 1800 / LTE 2100 / LTE 2600 / 5G 3500	former A1 / Mobilkom / PTA; UMTS shut down Jun 2025
232	02		A1 Telekom Austria	Reserved		
232	03	Magenta	T-Mobile Austria GmbH	Operational	GSM 900 / LTE 800 / LTE 1800 / LTE 2100 / LTE 2600 / 5G 700 / 5G 2100 / 5G 3500	former Max.Mobil, T-Mobile; national roaming agreement with 232-10: uses Hutchison Drei where no own coverage; UMTS shut down Jun 2024
232	04	Magenta	T-Mobile Austria GmbH	Unknown	Unknown	former T-Mobile
232	05	3	Hutchison Drei Austria	Operational	GSM 900 / GSM 1800 / LTE 900 / LTE 1800 / LTE 2100 / LTE 2600	owned by Hutchison Drei Austria / former Orange Austria / One / Connect; UMTS shut down Dec 2024
232	06	Orange AT	Orange Austria GmbH	Not operational	Unknown	MNC withdrawn
232	07	Hofer Telekom	T-Mobile Austria	Operational	MVNO	former tele.ring
232	08	Lycamobile	Lycamobile Austria	Operational	MVNO	
232	09	Tele2Mobil	A1 Telekom Austria	Operational	MVNO	division bought from Tele2 by A1 Telekom Austria; customers "moved" to bob (232–11)
232	10	3	Hutchison Drei Austria	Operational	LTE 1800 / LTE 2100 / LTE 2600 / 5G 700 / 5G 3500	national roaming agreement with 232-03: uses T-Mobile GSM where no own coverage; UMTS shut down Dec 2024
232	11	bob	A1 Telekom Austria	Operational	MVNO	brand of A1 Telekom Austria
232	12	yesss!	A1 Telekom Austria	Operational	MVNO	owned by A1 Telekom Austria / one-way national roaming agreement with 232–05
232	13	Magenta	T-Mobile Austria GmbH	Operational	MVNO	Former UPC Austria
232	14		Hutchison Drei Austria	Reserved	Unknown	
232	15	Vectone Mobile	Mundio Mobile Austria	Not operational	MVNO	former Barablu Mobile Austria; MNC withdrawn
232	16		Hutchison Drei Austria	Reserved	Unknown	
232	17	spusu	MASS Response Service GmbH	Operational	MVNO	
232	18	I-new	Compax MVNx Solutions GmbH	Unknown	MVNO	Former smartspace
232	19		Hutchison Drei Austria	Unknown	Unknown	Former Tele2 Telecommunication GmbH
232	20	m:tel	MTEL Austria GmbH	Operational	MVNO	By Serbian Telecom
232	21		Salzburg AG für Energie, Verkehr und Telekommunikation	Unknown	Unknown	
232	22		Plintron Austria Limited	Not operational	MVNO	MNC withdrawn
232	23	Magenta	T-Mobile Austria GmbH	Unknown	Unknown	
232	24		Smartel Services GmbH	Not operational	Unknown	MNC withdrawn
232	25		Holding Graz Kommunale Dienstleistungen GmbH	Unknown	Unknown	
232	26		LIWEST Kabelmedien GmbH	Unknown	Unknown	
232	27		TISMI B.V.	Unknown	Unknown	
232	28		MASS Response Service GmbH	Not operational	Unknown	MNC withdrawn
232	29		aicall telekommunikation	Unknown	MVNO	
232	30		Holding Graz Kommunale Dienstleistungen GmbH	Unknown	Unknown	
232	91	GSM-R A	ÖBB	Operational	GSM-R	railways communication
232	92	ArgoNET	ArgoNET GmbH	Operational	CDMA450 / LTE450	machine to machine communication for critical infrastructure

=== B ===
==== Belarus – BY ====
MCC	MNC	Brand	Operator	Status	Bands (MHz)	References and notes
257	01	A1	A1 Belarus	Operational	GSM 900 / GSM 1800 / UMTS 900 / UMTS 2100	Former velcom; LTE via beCloud
257	02	MTS	Mobile TeleSystems	Operational	GSM 900 / GSM 1800 / UMTS 900 / UMTS 2100	LTE via beCloud
257	03	DIALLOG	BelCel	Not operational	CDMA 450	Closed on 21 January 2014
257	04	life:)	Belarusian Telecommunications Network	Operational	GSM 900 / GSM 1800 / UMTS 2100	Former BeST; LTE via beCloud
257	05	byfly	Beltelecom	Not operational	WiMAX 3500	Closed on 1 May 2017
257	06	beCloud	Belorussian Cloud Technologies	Operational	LTE 800 / LTE 1800 / LTE 2600	Former Yota Bel; wholesale network used by MTS, life:), and A1

==== Belgium – BE ====
MCC	MNC	Brand	Operator	Status	Bands (MHz)	References and notes
206	00	Proximus	Proximus SA	Unknown	Unknown	Former Belgacom Mobile
206	01	Proximus	Proximus SA	Operational	GSM 900 / GSM 1800 / LTE 800 / LTE 1800 / LTE 2600 / 5G 2100 / 5G 3500	Former Belgacom Mobile; UMTS shut down Dec 2024
206	02		Infrabel	Operational	GSM-R	
206	03	Citymesh Connect	Citymesh NV	Operational	LTE 2600 / LTE 3500	MVNO and private network
206	04	MWingz	Proximus SA	Planned	Unknown	Shared Proximus / Orange Belgium
206	05	Telenet	Telenet	Operational	MVNO	Using Base's Network
206	06	Lycamobile	Lycamobile sprl	Operational	MVNO	Using Telenet
206	07	Vectone Mobile	Mundio Mobile Belgium nv	Not operational	MVNO	MNC withdrawn
206	08	VOO	Nethys	Operational	MVNO	
206	09		Proximus SA	Unknown	Unknown	Former Voxbone
206	10	Orange Belgium	Orange S.A.	Operational	GSM 900 / GSM 1800 / LTE 800 / LTE 1800 / LTE 2600 / 5G 3500	Former Mobistar; UMTS shut down Jul 2025
206	11	L-mobi	L-Mobi Mobile	Not operational	MVNO	MNC withdrawn
206	12	DIGI Belgium	DIGI Communications Belgium NV	Operational	LTE 1800	
206	13	Cwave	Citymesh Connect	Operational	LTE 1800	Shared DIGI Belgium / Citymesh
206	14	ALLOcloud	OpenS (Telavox)	Unknown	MVNO	
206	15		Elephant Talk Communications Schweiz GmbH	Not operational	Unknown	MNC withdrawn
206	16		NextGen Mobile Ltd.	Not operational	Unknown	MNC withdrawn
206	20	Base	Telenet	Operational	GSM 900 / GSM 1800 / LTE 800 / LTE 1800 / LTE 2600 / 5G 3500	UMTS shut down Sep 2024
206	22	Febo.mobi	FEBO Telecom	Not operational	MVNO	MNC withdrawn
206	23		Dust Mobile	Unknown	MVNO	
206	25		Citymesh Air	Unknown	5G 2600	Former Voyacom, Dense Air Belgium
206	28		BICS	Unknown	Unknown	
206	29		TISMI	Not operational	MVNO	MNC withdrawn
206	30		Proximus SA	Unknown	Unknown	Former Unleashed NV
206	33		Ericsson NV	Not operational	Unknown	Test network
206	34		ONOFFAPP OÜ	Unknown	MVNO	Former Dense Air Belgium SPRL
206	40	JOIN	JOIN Experience (Belgium)	Not operational	MVNO	MNC withdrawn
206	42		Mediafon Carrier Services UAB	Unknown	Unknown	
206	48		Network Research Belgium	Unknown	5G 3500	Test network
206	50		IP Nexia	Not operational	MVNO	MNC withdrawn
206	70		iSea	Unknown	5G 700	Test network
206	71		test	Not operational	Unknown	Test network; MNC withdrawn
206	72		test	Not operational	Unknown	Test network; MNC withdrawn
206	73		test	Not operational	Unknown	Test network; MNC withdrawn
206	74		test	Not operational	Unknown	Test network; MNC withdrawn
206	75		SGRS Cyber Command	Unknown	Unknown	
206	99		e-BO Enterprises	Unknown	5G	
270	77		Proximus Luxembourg S.A.	Unknown	Unknown	Uses Luxembourg MCC
270	99		Orange Communications Luxembourg S.A.	Unknown	Unknown	Uses Luxembourg MCC

==== Bosnia and Herzegovina – BA ====
MCC	MNC	Brand	Operator	Status	Bands (MHz)	References and notes
218	03	HT-ERONET	Public Enterprise Croatian Telecom Ltd.	Operational	GSM 900 / GSM 1800 / UMTS 2100 / LTE	
218	05	m:tel	RS Telecommunications JSC Banja Luka	Operational	GSM 900 / GSM 1800 / UMTS 2100 / LTE	GSM-MS1, Mobilna Srpske, Mobi's
218	90	BH Mobile	BH Telecom	Operational	GSM 900 / GSM 1800 / UMTS 2100 / LTE	GSMBiH

==== Bulgaria – BG ====
MCC	MNC	Brand	Operator	Status	Bands (MHz)	References and notes
284	01	A1 BG	A1 Bulgaria	Operational	GSM 900 / UMTS 900 / UMTS 2100 / LTE 900 / LTE 1800 / LTE 2100 / 5G 3500	Former Citron, Mobiltel, M-Tel
284	03	Vivacom	BTC	Operational	GSM 900 / UMTS 900 / UMTS 2100 / LTE 900 / LTE 1800 / LTE 2100 / 5G 1800 / 5G 3500	Former Vivatel
284	05	Yettel	Yettel Bulgaria	Operational	GSM 900 / UMTS 900 / UMTS 2100 / LTE 1800 / LTE 2100 / 5G 2600 / 5G 3500	Former Globul, Telenor
284	07	НКЖИ	НАЦИОНАЛНА КОМПАНИЯ ЖЕЛЕЗОПЪТНА ИНФРАСТРУКТУРА	Operational	GSM-R	(The Bulgarian) National Railway Infrastructure Company
284	09		COMPATEL LIMITED	Not operational	Unknown	MNC withdrawn
284	11		Bulsatcom	Not operational	LTE 1800	MNC withdrawn
284	13	Ти.ком	Ti.com JSC	Not Operational	LTE 1800	Former Max Telecom; MNC withdrawn

=== C ===
==== Croatia – HR ====
MCC	MNC	Brand	Operator	Status	Bands (MHz)	References and notes
219	01	HT HR	T-Hrvatski Telekom	Operational	GSM 900 / GSM 1800 / LTE 800 / LTE 1800 / 5G 700 / 5G 2100 / 5G 3500	Former CRONET, HTmobile; UMTS shut down Feb 2025
219	02		Telemach	Operational	GSM 1800 / UMTS 900 / UMTS 2100 / LTE 1800 / LTE 2600 / 5G 700 / 5G 3500	Former Tele2
219	03		ALTAVOX d.o.o.	Unknown	Unknown	
219	04		NTH Mobile d.o.o.	Unknown	MVNO	
219	10	A1 HR	A1 Hrvatska	Operational	GSM 900 / GSM 1800 / LTE 800 / LTE 1800 / 5G 700 / 5G 3500	Former Vipnet; UMTS shut down July 2026
219	12		TELE FOCUS d.o.o.	Not operational	MVNO	MNC withdrawn
219	13		FENICE TELEKOM GRUPA d.o.o.	Unknown	Unknown	
219	15		BSG Estonia OÜ	Unknown	Unknown	
219	19		YATECO	Unknown	Unknown	
219	20	T-Mobile HR	T-Hrvatski Telekom	Unknown	Unknown	
219	22	Mobile One	Mobile One Ltd.	Unknown	Unknown	
219	28		Lancelot B.V.	Unknown	Unknown	
219	30		INNOVACOM OÜ	Not operational	Unknown	MNC withdrawn
219	55		DIGICOM d.o.o.	Unknown	5G 3500	Private networks
219	99		Markoja d.o.o.	Unknown	Unknown	

==== Cyprus – CY ====
MCC	MNC	Brand	Operator	Status	Bands (MHz)	References and notes
280	01	Cytamobile-Vodafone	Cyprus Telecommunications Authority	Operational	GSM 900 / GSM 1800 / UMTS 900 / UMTS 2100 / LTE 800 / LTE 1800 / LTE 2600 / 5G 700 / 5G 3500	
280	02	Cytamobile-Vodafone	Cyprus Telecommunications Authority	Unknown	Unknown	
280	10	Epic	Monaco Telecom	Operational	GSM 900 / GSM 1800 / UMTS 900 / UMTS 2100 / LTE 800 / LTE 1800 / LTE 2600	Former MTN
280	20	PrimeTel	PrimeTel PLC	Operational	UMTS 2100 / LTE 900 / LTE 1800	Originally MVNO, MNO since 2015. Uses Epic for 2G/3G roaming.
280	22	lemontel	Lemontel Ltd	Operational	MVNO	
280	23	Vectone Mobile	Mundio Mobile Cyprus Ltd.	Not operational	MVNO	MNC withdrawn

==== Czech Republic – CZ ====
MCC	MNC	Brand	Operator	Status	Bands (MHz)	References and notes
230	01	T-Mobile	T-Mobile Czech Republic	Operational	GSM 900 / LTE 800 / LTE 1800 / LTE 2100 / LTE 2600 / 5G 700 / 5G 1800 / 5G 2100	Former Paegas; UMTS shut down Nov 2021
230	02	O_{2}	O2 Czech Republic	Operational	GSM 900 / GSM 1800 / LTE 800 / LTE 900 / LTE 1800 / LTE 2600 / TD-LTE 2600 / 5G 1800 / 5G 2100 / 5G 3700	Former Eurotel; CDMA 450 shut down June 2019; UMTS shut down Nov 2021
230	03	Vodafone	Vodafone Czech Republic	Operational	GSM 900 / GSM 1800 / LTE 800 / LTE 1800 / LTE 2100 / LTE 2600 / 5G 700 / 5G 1800 / 5G 2100 / 5G 3500	Former Oskar; UMTS shut down Mar 2021
230	04	Nordic Telecom	O2 Czech Republic	Operational	MVNO / LTE 410	Former U:fon, Air Telecom; CDMA 410 MHz shut down Dec 2017; LTE 410 for public safety services
230	05		PODA a.s.	Operational	TD-LTE 3700	Former TRAVEL TELEKOMMUNIKATION; fixed wireless
230	06		Nordic Telecom 5G a.s.	Not operational	TD-LTE 3700 / 5G 3500	Former OSNO TELECOMUNICATION; MNC withdrawn
230	07	T-Mobile	T-Mobile Czech Republic	Operational	LTE 800	Former ASTELNET
230	08		Compatel s.r.o.	Unknown	Unknown	
230	09	Unimobile	Uniphone, s.r.o.	Unknown	MVNO	Former Vectone/Mundio
230	10		DataCell s.r.o.	Unknown	Unknown	
230	11		incrate s.r.o.	Not operational	5G 700 / 5G 3500	MNC withdrawn
230	22	O_{2}	O2 Czech Republic	Unknown	Unknown	
230	53		Škoda Auto a.s.	Unknown	Unknown	
230	98		Správa železniční dopravní cesty, s.o.	Operational	GSM-R 900	railways communication
230	99	Vodafone	Vodafone Czech Republic	Not operational	GSM 1800	R&D Centre at FEE, CTU (educational, experimental); licence expired Jul 2012

=== D ===
==== Denmark (Kingdom of Denmark) – DK ====
MCC	MNC	Brand	Operator	Status	Bands (MHz)	References and notes
238	01	TDC	TDC A/S	Operational	GSM 900 / LTE 800 / LTE 1800 / LTE 2600 / 5G 700 / 5G 3500	UMTS shut down Dec 2022
238	02	Telenor	Telenor Denmark	Operational	GSM 900 / GSM 1800 / LTE 800 / LTE 1800 / LTE 2100 / LTE 2600	Former Sonofon; UMTS shutdown 2023
238	03		Syniverse Technologies	Not operational	Unknown	Former End2End, MIGway A/S, MACH Connectivity; MNC withdrawn
238	04		Nexcon.io ApS	Not operational	Unknown	Former NextGen Mobile Ltd T/A CardBoardFish MNC withdrawn
238	05	TetraNet	Dansk Beredskabskommunikation A/S	Operational	TETRA	Former ApS KBUS 38 nr. 4418; owned by Motorola Solutions
238	06	3	Hi3G Denmark ApS	Operational	LTE 900 / LTE 1800 / LTE 2100 / LTE 2600 / TD-LTE 2600 / 5G 700 / 5G 2100 / 5G 3500	UMTS shut down Dec 2025
238	07	Vectone Mobile	Mundio Mobile (Denmark) Limited	Not operational	MVNO	Former Barablu; MNC withdrawn
238	08	Voxbone	Voxbone mobile	Operational	MVNO	Former Nordisk Mobiltelefon
238	09	SINE	Dansk Beredskabskommunikation A/S	Operational	TETRA	Owned by Motorola Solutions
238	10	TDC	TDC A/S	Operational	Unknown	Test network
238	11	SINE	Dansk Beredskabskommunikation A/S	Operational	TETRA	Test network
238	12	Lycamobile	Lycamobile Denmark Ltd	Operational	MVNO	
238	13		Compatel Limited	Unknown	Unknown	
238	14		Monty UK Global Limited	Not operational	Unknown	MNC withdrawn
238	15	Net 1	Cibicom	Operational	LTE 450	
238	16		Tismi B.V.	Unknown	Unknown	
238	17		Gotanet AB	Unknown	Unknown	Former Naka AG
238	18		Cubic Telecom	Unknown	Unknown	
238	19		YATECO OÜ	Unknown	Unknown	
238	20	Telia	Telia	Operational	GSM 900 / GSM 1800 / LTE 800 / LTE 1800 / LTE 2600	UMTS shut down 2023
238	23	GSM-R DK	Banedanmark	Operational	GSM-R	
238	25	Viahub	SMS Provider Corp.	Unknown	MVNO	
238	28		LINK Mobile A/S	Unknown	Unknown	Former CoolTEL ApS
238	30		Interactive digital media GmbH	Unknown	Unknown	Former Telia
238	40		Ericsson Danmark A/S	Not operational	Unknown	Test network; former Sense Communications Denmark A/S; MNC withdrawn
238	42	Wavely	Greenwave Mobile IoT ApS	Operational	MVNO	Former Brandtel ApS, Tel42 ApS
238	43		MobiWeb Limited	Not operational	Unknown	MNC withdrawn
238	66		TT-Netværket P/S	Operational	GSM 900 / GSM 1800 / LTE 800 / LTE 900 / LTE 1800 / LTE 2100 / 5G 1800 / 5G 3500	Former Telia, now shared network Telia/Telenor; UMTS shut down 2023
238	73	Onomondo	Onomondo ApS	Operational	MVNO	
238	77	Telenor	Telenor Denmark	Not operational	GSM 900 / GSM 1800	Former Tele2; MNC withdrawn
238	88		Cobira ApS	Unknown	Unknown	
238	95		Dansk Beredskabskommunikation A/S	Unknown	Unknown	Test network
238	96	Telia	Telia Danmark	Not operational	Unknown	Test network; MNC withdrawn

=== E ===
==== Estonia – EE ====
MCC	MNC	Brand	Operator	Status	Bands (MHz)	References and notes
248	01	Telia	Telia Eesti	Operational	GSM 900 / GSM 1800 / LTE 800 / LTE 1800 / LTE 2100 / LTE 2600 / 5G 700 / 5G 2100 / 5G 3500	Former EMT; UMTS shut down Dec 2023
248	02	Elisa	Elisa Eesti	Operational	GSM 900 / GSM 1800 / LTE 800 / LTE 1800 / LTE 2100 / LTE 2600 / 5G 700 / 5G 3500	UMTS shut down Nov 2024
248	03	Tele2	Tele2 Eesti	Operational	GSM 900 / GSM 1800 / LTE 800 / LTE 1800 / LTE 2100 / 5G 700 / 5G 2300 / 5G 3500	UMTS shut down Nov 2025
248	04	Top Connect	OY Top Connect	Operational	MVNO	
248	05	CSC Telecom	CSC Telecom Estonia OÜ	Operational	MVNO	Former AS Bravocom Mobiil
248	06		Progroup Holding	Not operational	UMTS 2100	MNC withdrawn
248	07	Kõu	Televõrgu AS	Not operational	CDMA2000 450	Acquired by Tele 2 in 2012; shut down in January 2016
248	08		Signalmover OÜ	Operational	Unknown	Former VIVEX
248	09		Bravo Telecom	Not operational	Unknown	MNC withdrawn
248	10		Intergo Telecom OÜ	Unknown	Unknown	Former Telcotrade
248	11		UAB Raystorm Eesti filiaal	Unknown	Unknown	
248	12		Ntel Solutions OÜ	Unknown	Unknown	
248	13		Telia Eesti AS	Not operational	Unknown	MNC withdrawn
248	14		Estonian Crafts OÜ	Unknown	Unknown	
248	15		BSG Estonia OÜ	Unknown	Unknown	Former Premium Net International
248	16	dzinga	SmartTel Plus OÜ	Operational	MVNO	
248	17		Baltergo OÜ	Not operational	Unknown	MNC withdrawn
248	18		Cloud Communications OÜ	Not operational	Unknown	MNC withdrawn
248	19		OkTelecom OÜ	Unknown	Unknown	
248	20		DOTT Telecom OÜ	Operational	MVNO	
248	21		Trinavo LLC	Unknown	Unknown	Former Tismi B.V.
248	22		M2MConnect OÜ	Unknown	Unknown	
248	24		Novametro OÜ	Unknown	MVNO	
248	25		Eurofed OÜ	Not operational	Unknown	MNC withdrawn
248	26		IT-Decision Telecom OÜ	Operational	MVNO	
248	28		Nord Connect OÜ	Unknown	Unknown	
248	29		SkyTel OÜ	Not operational	Unknown	MNC withdrawn
248	30		Mediafon Carrier Services OÜ	Unknown	MVNO	
248	31		YATECO OÜ	Unknown	Unknown	
248	32		Narayana OÜ	Unknown	Unknown	
248	33	JAZZ MOBILE	J-MOBILE OÜ	Not operational	MVNO	Former Crowdfaster; MNC withdrawn
248	34		Nettora Systems OÜ	Not operational	Unknown	MNC withdrawn
248	35		Teliqon Communications OÜ	Unknown	Unknown	
248	36		GlobalCell EU	Operational	MVNO	
248	37		Revaltex Group OÜ	Unknown	MVNO	
248	71		Siseministeerium (Ministry of Interior)	Unknown	Unknown	

=== F ===
==== Faroe Islands (Kingdom of Denmark) – FO ====
MCC	MNC	Brand	Operator	Status	Bands (MHz)	References and notes
288	01	Føroya Tele	Føroya Tele	Operational	GSM 900 / UMTS 900 / UMTS 2100 / LTE 800 / LTE 1800 / 5G	
288	02	Nema	Nema	Operational	GSM 900 / UMTS 2100 / LTE 1800	Former Kall, Vodafone, Hey; also uses MCC 274 MNC 02 (Iceland)
288	03	TOSA	Tosa Sp/F	Not operational	GSM 900 / UMTS 2100 / LTE 1800	Former Edge Mobile; MNC withdrawn
288	10	Føroya Tele	Føroya Tele	Unknown	Unknown	

==== Finland – FI ====
MCC	MNC	Brand	Operator	Status	Bands (MHz)	References and notes
244	03	DNA	DNA Oy	Operational	GSM 1800	Former Telia
244	04	DNA	DNA Oy	Unknown	Unknown	Former Aina Oyj
244	05	Elisa	Elisa Oyj	Operational	GSM 900 / GSM 1800 / LTE 700 / LTE 800 / LTE 1800 / LTE 2100 / LTE 2600 / TD-LTE 2600 / 5G 3500	Former Radiolinja; UMTS shut down Nov 2023
244	06	Elisa	Elisa Oyj	Not operational	Unknown	MNC withdrawn
244	07	Nokia	Nokia Solutions and Networks Oy	Operational	GSM 900 / GSM 1800 / UMTS 2100 / LTE 1800 / LTE 2600 / TD-LTE 2600	Test network in Espoo Leppävaara and Nokia HQ
244	08	Nokia	Nokia Solutions and Networks Oy	Unknown	GSM 1800 / UMTS 2100	
244	09		Nokia Solutions and Networks Oy	Unknown	GSM 900	Former Finnet Group
244	10		Traficom	Unknown	Unknown	Former TDC Oy Finland
244	11		Traficom	Unknown	Unknown	Former Vectone Mobile
244	12	DNA	DNA Oy	Operational	GSM 900 / GSM 1800 / LTE 700 / LTE 800 / LTE 1800 / LTE 2100 / LTE 2600 / 5G 700 / 5G 1800 / 5G 2100 / 5G 2600 / 5G 3500 / 5G 26000	UMTS shut down Jan 2024
244	13	DNA	DNA Oy	Not operational	GSM 900 / GSM 1800	
244	14	Ålcom	Ålands Telekommunikation Ab	Operational	UMTS 900 / UMTS 2100 / LTE 800 / LTE 1800	Former Ålands Mobiltelefon (ÅMT); coverage only in Åland; GSM shut down Feb 2025
244	15		Telit Wireless Solutions GmbH	Unknown	Unknown	Former educational network of Satakunta University of Applied Sciences
244	16		Digita Oy	Unknown	Unknown	Former Tele2
244	17		Liikennevirasto	Operational	GSM-R	Finnish Transport Agency
244	19		Nettia Oy	Operational	MVNO	
244	20		Elisa Oyj	Unknown	Unknown	Former Telia
244	21	Elisa- Saunalahti	Elisa Oyj	Operational	MVNO	Internal MVNO-code of Elisa Oyj. Former Saunalahti Group Oyj
244	22		EXFO Oy	Not operational	Unknown	Former NetHawk Oyj; MNC withdrawn
244	23		EXFO Oy	Not operational	Unknown	Former NetHawk Oyj; MNC withdrawn
244	24		Nord Connect UAB	Not operational	Unknown	Former Tampere University of Technology foundation; MNC withdrawn
244	25		Fortum Power and Heat Oy	Unknown	Unknown	Former Datame Oy CDMA
244	26		Teollisuuden Voima Oyj	Unknown	Unknown	Former Compatel
244	27		Teknologian tutkimuskeskus VTT Oy	Unknown	LTE 450 / LTE 1800 / LTE 2100 / LTE 2600 / 5G 3500 / 5G mmWave	VTT Technical Research Centre of Finland
244	28		Teknologian tutkimuskeskus VTT Oy	Unknown	Unknown	VTT Technical Research Centre of Finland
244	29		Teknologian tutkimuskeskus VTT Oy	Unknown	Unknown	Former SCNL Truphone, VTT Technical Research Centre of Finland
244	30		Teknologian tutkimuskeskus VTT Oy	Unknown	Unknown	Former Mundio Mobile Oy, VTT Technical Research Centre of Finland
244	31		Teknologian tutkimuskeskus VTT Oy	Unknown	Unknown	Former Ukko Mobile Oy, VTT Technical Research Centre of Finland
244	32	Voxbone	Voxbone SA	Not operational	MVNO	MNC withdrawn
244	33	VIRVE	Suomen Turvallisuusverkko Oy	Operational	TETRA	Finnish authorities radio network
244	34	Bittium Wireless	Bittium Wireless Oy	Not operational	MVNO	MNC withdrawn
244	35		Edzcom Oy	Operational	LTE 450 / TD-LTE 2600	Former Ukkoverkot; data-only network
244	36	Telia / DNA	Telia Finland Oyj / Suomen Yhteisverkko Oy	Operational	GSM 900 / GSM 1800 / LTE 800 / LTE 900 / LTE 1800 / LTE 2100 / LTE 2600 / 5G	Joint mobile network in Northern and Eastern Finland areas; UMTS shut down Dec 2024
244	37	Tismi	Tismi BV	Not operational	MVNO	MNC withdrawn
244	38		Nokia Solutions and Networks Oy	Unknown	Unknown	Test network
244	39		Nokia Solutions and Networks Oy	Not operational	Unknown	Test network; MNC withdrawn
244	40		Nokia Solutions and Networks Oy	Unknown	Unknown	Test network;
244	41		Nokia Solutions and Networks Oy	Not operational	Unknown	Test network MNC withdrawn
244	42		SMS Provider Corp.	Unknown	Unknown	
244	43		Telavox AB / Telavox Oy	Unknown	Unknown	
244	44		Turun ammattikorkeakoulu Oy	Not operational	Unknown	MNC withdrawn
244	45		Suomen Turvallisuusverkko Oy	Unknown	Unknown	Public safety network
244	46		Suomen Turvallisuusverkko Oy	Unknown	Unknown	Public safety network
244	47		Suomen Turvallisuusverkko Oy	Unknown	Unknown	Public safety network
244	50		Aalto-korkeakoulusäätiö sr	Not operational	Unknown	MNC withdrawn
244	51		Aalto-korkeakoulusäätiö sr	Unknown	NB-IoT 700	
244	52		Aalto-korkeakoulusäätiö sr	Unknown	5G 3500	
244	53		Aalto-korkeakoulusäätiö sr	Unknown	Unknown	
244	54		Aalto-korkeakoulusäätiö sr	Not operational	Unknown	MNC withdrawn
244	55		Aalto-korkeakoulusäätiö sr	Unknown	Unknown	
244	56		Aalto-korkeakoulusäätiö sr	Not operational	Unknown	MNC withdrawn
244	57		Aalto-korkeakoulusäätiö sr	Not operational	Unknown	MNC withdrawn
244	58		Aalto-korkeakoulusäätiö sr	Not operational	Unknown	MNC withdrawn
244	59		Aalto-korkeakoulusäätiö sr	Not operational	Unknown	MNC withdrawn
244	91	Telia	Telia Finland Oyj	Operational	GSM 900 / GSM 1800 / LTE 700 / LTE 800 / LTE 1800 / LTE 2100 / LTE 2600 / 5G 3500	Former Sonera; UMTS shut down Oct 2024
244	92	Sonera	TeliaSonera Finland Oyj	Not operational	Unknown	MNC withdrawn
244	93		Telia Finland Oyj	Unknown	Unknown	
244	95		Säteilyturvakeskus	Unknown	Unknown	
244	99		Oy L M Ericsson Ab	Not operational	Unknown	MNC withdrawn

==== France – FR ====
MCC	MNC	Brand	Operator	Status	Bands (MHz)	References and notes
208	01	Orange	Orange S.A.	Operational	UMTS 900 / UMTS 2100 / LTE 700 / LTE 800 / LTE 1800 / LTE 2100 / LTE 2600 / 5G 700 / 5G 2100 / 5G 3500	GSM shut down Oct 2026
208	02	Orange	Orange S.A.	Operational	UMTS 900 / UMTS 2100 / LTE 700 / LTE 800 / LTE 1800 / LTE 2100 / LTE 2600 / 5G 2100 / 5G 3500	Zones Blanches GSM shut down Oct 2026
208	03		Onoff Telecom	Operational	MVNO	Former MobiquiThings, Sierra Wireless
208	04		Nexera	Operational	MVNO	Former Sisteer, Netcom Group
208	05		Globalstar Europe	Operational	Satellite	
208	06		Globalstar Europe	Not operational	Satellite	MNC withdrawn
208	07		Globalstar Europe	Not operational	Satellite	MNC withdrawn
208	08	SFR	Altice	Operational	MVNO	Former Completel
208	09	SFR	Altice	Operational	GSM 900 / UMTS 900 / UMTS 2100 / LTE 800 / LTE 1800 / LTE 2100 / LTE 2600 / 5G 2100 / 5G 3500	is launched for SFR outbound roaming services
208	10	SFR	Altice	Operational	GSM 900 / UMTS 900 / UMTS 2100 / LTE 800 / LTE 1800 / LTE 2100 / LTE 2600 / 5G 2100 / 5G 3500	MNC also used in Monaco
208	11	SFR	Altice	Operational	UMTS 2100	Femtocells
208	12		1Global Operations France	Operational	MVNO	Former Hewlett-Packard France, Truphone France
208	13	SFR	Altice	Operational	GSM 900 / UMTS 900 / UMTS 2100 / LTE 800 / LTE 1800 / LTE 2100 / LTE 2600 / 5G 3500	Zones Blanches
208	14	SNCF Réseau	SNCF Réseau	Operational	GSM-R	
208	15	Free	Free Mobile	Operational	LTE 700 / LTE 1800 / LTE 2600 / 5G 700 / 5G 3500	Principal Network; UMTS shut down Dec 2025
208	16	Free	Free Mobile	Operational	LTE 700 / LTE 1800 / LTE 2600	
208	17	LEGOS	Local Exchange Global Operation Services	Unknown	Unknown	
208	18	Voxbone	Voxbone mobile	Not operational	MVNO	MNC withdrawn
208	19		Haute-Garonne numérique	Operational	LTE	Former Altitude Infrastructure; fixed wireless
208	20	Bouygues	Bouygues Telecom	Operational	GSM 900 / UMTS 900 / UMTS 2100 / LTE 700 / LTE 800 / LTE 1800 / LTE 2100 / LTE 2600 / 5G 2100 / 5G 3500	MNC also used in Monaco
208	21	Bouygues	Bouygues Telecom	Not operational	GSM 900 / GSM 1800 / UMTS 2100 / UMTS 900	MNC withdrawn
208	22	Transatel Mobile	Transatel	Unknown	MVNO	MVNE Uses Orange
208	23		Syndicat mixte ouvert Charente Numérique	Operational	TD-LTE	Former Omea Telecom (bought by SFR in 2014); fixed wireless
208	24	Sierra Wireless	Sierra Wireless France	Operational	MVNO	Former MobiquiThings
208	25	LycaMobile	LycaMobile	Operational	MVNO	Using Bouygues Telecom
208	26	NRJ Mobile	Bouygues Telecom - Distribution	Operational	MVNO	Former Euro-Information Telecom
208	27		Coriolis Telecom	Operational	MVNO	Former Afone Using Altice SFR
208	28	AIF	Airmob Infra Full	Operational	MVNO	Using Orange Network
208	29		Cubic télécom France	Operational	MVNO	Former Société International Mobile Communication
208	30		Syma Mobile	Operational	MVNO	
208	31	Vectone Mobile	Mundio Mobile	Not operational	MVNO	Uses SFR or RED; MNC withdrawn
208	32	Orange	Orange S.A.	Not operational	Unknown	MNC withdrawn
208	33	Fibre64	Département des Pyrénées-Atlantiques	Unknown	WiMAX	fixed wireless
208	34		Cellhire France	Operational	MVNO	
208	35	Free	Free Mobile	Not operational	UMTS 900 / UMTS 2100 / LTE 700 / LTE 1800 / LTE 2100 / LTE 2600	MNC withdrawn
208	36	Free	Free Mobile	Not operational	UMTS 900 / UMTS 2100 / LTE 700 / LTE 1800 / LTE 2100 / LTE 2600	MNC withdrawn
208	37		IP Directions	Unknown	Unknown	
208	38		Lebara France Ltd	Operational	MVNO	
208	39		Netwo	Unknown	Unknown	
208	500		EDF	Unknown	Unknown	MNC 50 formerly assigned to EDF
208	50144		TotalEnergies Global Information Technology services	Unknown	Unknown	
208	50164		TotalEnergies Global Information Technology services	Unknown	Unknown	
208	50168		Butachimie	Unknown	Unknown	
208	50169		Eiffage Énergie Systèmes	Unknown	Unknown	Former SNEF telecom
208	50176		Grand port fluvio-maritime de l'axe Seine	Not operational	Unknown	MNC withdrawn
208	50177		Société des Grands Projets	Unknown	Unknown	
208	50192		Société des Grands Projets	Unknown	Unknown	
208	50193		Société des Grands Projets	Unknown	Unknown	
208	50194		Société des Grands Projets	Unknown	Unknown	Former Société du Grand Paris
208	50244		EDF	Unknown	Unknown	Former General Electric Digital Services Europe
208	50268		Constellium Neuf-Brisach	Unknown	Unknown	
208	50277		Celeste	Unknown	Unknown	
208	50357		ArcelorMittal France	Unknown	Unknown	
208	50359		ArcelorMittal France	Unknown	Unknown	
208	50387		Axione	Unknown	Unknown	
208	50430		Centre à l'énergie atomique et aux énergies alternatives	Unknown	Unknown	
208	50484		Centre à l'énergie atomique et aux énergies alternatives	Unknown	Unknown	
208	50531		Alsatis	Unknown	Unknown	
208	50549		Thales SIX GTS France	Unknown	Unknown	
208	50591		Société des Grands Projets	Unknown	Unknown	Former Société du Grand Paris
208	50631		Airbus	Unknown	Unknown	
208	50644		Airbus	Unknown	Unknown	
208	50692		Axione	Not operational	Unknown	MNC withdrawn
208	50778		GTS France	Unknown	Unknown	
208	50876		Hanseatic Global Terminals Le Havre	Unknown	Unknown	
208	50877		Euro Disney Associés SAS	Unknown	Unknown	
208	50935	SNCF	Société nationale des chemins de fer français	Unknown	Unknown	
208	50967	SNCF	Société nationale des chemins de fer français	Unknown	Unknown	
208	50975	SNCF	Société nationale des chemins de fer français	Unknown	Unknown	
208	51075	RATP	Régie autonome des transports parisiens	Unknown	Unknown	
208	51094	RATP	Régie autonome des transports parisiens	Unknown	Unknown	
208	670		P1 Security	Unknown	Unknown	
208	700		Weaccess group	Unknown	Unknown	
208	701		GIP Vendée numérique	Unknown	Unknown	
208	702		17-Numerique	Unknown	Unknown	
208	703		Nivertel	Unknown	Unknown	
208	704		Axione Limousin	Unknown	Unknown	
208	705		Hautes-Pyrénées Numérique	Unknown	Unknown	
208	706		Tours Métropole Numérique	Unknown	Unknown	
208	707		Sartel THD	Unknown	Unknown	
208	708		Melis@ territoires ruraux	Unknown	Unknown	
208	709		Quimper communauté télécom	Unknown	Unknown	
208	710		Losange	Not operational	Unknown	MNC withdrawn
208	711		Nomotech	Unknown	Unknown	MNC withdrawn
208	712		Syndicat Audois d'énergies et du Numérique	Unknown	Unknown	
208	713		SD NUM SAS	Unknown	Unknown	
208	714		Département de l'Isère	Unknown	Unknown	
208	86		SEM@FOR77	Unknown	Unknown	Former Nomotech
208	87		Airbus defence and space SAS	Unknown	Unknown	Former RATP
208	88	Bouygues	Bouygues Telecom	Operational	GSM 900 / UMTS 900 / UMTS 2100 / LTE 700 / LTE 800 / LTE 1800 / LTE 2100 / LTE 2600 / 5G 2100 / 5G 3500	Zones Blanches
208	89		Hub One	Unknown	Unknown	Former Omer Telecom Ltd, Fondation b-com
208	90		Images & Réseaux	Not operational	Unknown	MNC withdrawn
208	91		Orange S.A.	Unknown	Unknown	
208	92	Com4Innov	Association Plate-forme Télécom	Not operational	TD-LTE 2300 / LTE 2600	Test network; MNC withdrawn
208	93		Thales Communications & Security SAS	Not operational	Unknown	Former TDF; MNC withdrawn
208	94		Halys	Unknown	Unknown	
208	95		Orange S.A.	Not operational	Unknown	MNC withdrawn
208	96		Région Bourgogne-Franche-Comté	Operational	LTE	Former Axione; fixed wireless
208	97		Thales Communications & Security SAS	Not operational	Unknown	MNC withdrawn
208	98		Société Air France	Not operational	Unknown	MNC withdrawn
270	07	Bouygues	Bouygues Telecom	Unknown	Unknown	Uses Luxembourg MCC

=== G ===
==== Georgia – GE ====
MCC	MNC	Brand	Operator	Status	Bands (MHz)	References and notes
282	01	Geocell	Silknet	Operational	GSM 900 / GSM 1800 / UMTS 2100 / LTE 1800 / 5G	
282	02	Magti	MagtiCom	Operational	GSM 900 / GSM 1800 / UMTS 900 / UMTS 2100 / LTE 800 / LTE 1800	
282	03	MagtiFix	MagtiCom	Operational	CDMA 450	License until 2029
282	04	Cellfie	Cellfie Mobile	Operational	GSM 900 / GSM 1800 / UMTS 2100 / LTE 800 / 5G 700 / 5G 3500	former Mobitel, Beeline
282	05	S1	Silknet	Operational	CDMA 800	former UTG
282	06		JSC Compatel	Unknown	Unknown	
282	07	GlobalCell	GlobalCell	Operational	MVNO	
282	08	Silk LTE	Silknet	Operational	LTE 2300	CDMA 850 shut down Nov 2019
282	09		Gmobile	Operational	Unknown	
282	10		Premium Net International SRL	Unknown	Unknown	
282	11		Mobilive	Unknown	Unknown	
282	12		Telecom1 Ltd	Unknown	Unknown	Former Datacomm
282	13		Asanet Ltd	Unknown	Unknown	
282	14	DataCell	DataHouse Global	Unknown	MVNO	
282	15		Servicebox Ltd	Unknown	Unknown	
282	16		Unicell Mobile Ltd	Unknown	Unknown	
282	17		TMTECH Ltd	Unknown	Unknown	
282	18		Lagi Ltd.	Unknown	Unknown	
282	22	Myphone	Myphone Ltd	Unknown	Unknown	
282	66		Icecell Telecom LLC	Unknown	Unknown	

==== Germany – DE ====
MCC	MNC	Brand	Operator	Status	Bands (MHz)	References and notes
262	01	Telekom	Telekom Deutschland GmbH	Operational	GSM 900 / LTE 700 / LTE 800 / LTE 900 / LTE 1800 / LTE 2100 / LTE 2600 / 5G 700 / 5G 2100 / 5G 3500	Formerly D1 - DeTeMobil, D1-Telekom, T-D1, T-Mobile; UMTS shut down Jun 2021
262	02	Vodafone	Vodafone D2 GmbH	Operational	GSM 900 / LTE 700 / LTE 800 / LTE 900 / LTE 1800 / LTE 2100 / LTE 2600 / 5G 700 / 5G 1800 / 5G 3500	Former D2 Mannesmann; UMTS shut down Jun 2021
262	03	O_{2}	Telefónica Germany GmbH & Co. oHG	Operational	GSM 900 / LTE 700 / LTE 800 / LTE 900 / LTE 1800 / LTE 2100 / LTE 2600 / 5G 700 / 5G 3500	Former E-Plus until 2014; UMTS shut down Dec 2021
262	04	Vodafone	Vodafone D2 GmbH	Reserved	GSM 900 / GSM 1800 / UMTS 2100	
262	05	O_{2}	Telefónica Germany GmbH & Co. oHG	Reserved	GSM 900 / GSM 1800 / UMTS 900 / UMTS 2100	Former E-Plus
262	06	Telekom	Telekom Deutschland GmbH	Reserved	GSM 900 / LTE 800 / LTE 900 / LTE 1500 / LTE 1800 / LTE 2100 / LTE 2600 / 5G 2100 / 5G 3500	
262	07	O_{2}	Telefónica Germany GmbH & Co. oHG	Operational	GSM 900 / GSM 1800 / UMTS 2100 / LTE 800 / LTE 1800 / LTE 2600	Merged with E-Plus Mobilfunk in 2014
262	08	O_{2}	Telefónica Germany GmbH & Co. oHG	Reserved	GSM 900 / GSM 1800 / UMTS 2100	
262	09	Vodafone	Vodafone D2 GmbH	Operational	GSM 900 / GSM 1800 / LTE 2600	Internal testing IOT
262	10		DB Netz AG	Operational	GSM-R	Former Arcor, Vodafone
262	11	O_{2}	Telefónica Germany GmbH & Co. oHG	Reserved	GSM 900 / GSM 1800 / UMTS 2100	
262	12	Simquadrat	sipgate GmbH	Operational	MVNO	National roaming with O_{2} (former E-Plus)
262	13	BAAINBw	Bundesamt für Ausrüstung, Informationstechnik und Nutzung der Bundeswehr	Unknown	Unknown	Former Mobilcom
262	14		Lebara Limited	Operational	MVNO	Former Group 3G UMTS
262	15	Airdata		Operational	TD-SCDMA	data only
262	16		Telogic Germany GmbH	Not operational	MVNO	formerly Vistream; bankruptcy in 2012; MNC withdrawn
262	17	O_{2}	Telefónica Germany GmbH & Co. oHG	Not operational	Unknown	Former E-Plus; MNC withdrawn
262	18		NetCologne	Operational	MVNO	CDMA 450 shut down
262	19	450connect	Alliander AG ^{[ nl ]}	Operational	LTE 450	Former Inquam
262	20	Enreach	Enreach Germany GmbH	Operational	MVNO	Uses O_{2} (262–03)
262	21	spusu	spusu Deutschland GmbH	Unknown	MVNO	Former Multiconnect
262	22		sipgate Wireless GmbH	Unknown	MVNO	
262	23	1&1	Drillisch Online AG	Operational	5G 3500 / MVNO	
262	24		TelcoVillage GmbH	Unknown	Unknown	
262	25	MTEL	MTEL Deutschland GmbH	Unknown	MVNO	
262	26		Simsalasim Germany GmbH	Unknown	MVNO	Simsalasim Germany GmbH
262	33	simquadrat	sipgate GmbH	Not operational	MVNO	Uses O_{2} (former E-Plus) (262–03); MNC withdrawn
262	41		First Telecom GmbH	Not operational	Unknown	MNC withdrawn
262	42	CCC Event	Chaos Computer Club	Temporary operational	GSM 1800	Used on events like Chaos Communication Congress
262	43	Lycamobile	Lycamobile	Operational	MVNO	Uses Vodafone
262	60		DB Telematik	Operational	GSM-R 900	
262	70		BDBOS	Operational	Tetra	
262	71		GSMK	Unknown	Unknown	
262	72		Ericsson GmbH	Unknown	Unknown	
262	73		Nokia	Unknown	Unknown	Former Xantaro Deutschland GmbH
262	74		Ericsson GmbH	Unknown	Unknown	Former Qualcomm; also used in Sweden
262	75		Core Network Dynamics GmbH	Not operational	Unknown	Test network; MNC withdrawn
262	76		BDBOS	Unknown	Unknown	Former Siemens
262	77	O_{2}	Telefónica Germany GmbH & Co. oHG	Not operational	GSM 900	Former E-Plus; test network; MNC withdrawn
262	78	Telekom	Telekom Deutschland GmbH	Unknown	Unknown	
262	79		ng4T GmbH	Not operational	Unknown	MNC withdrawn
262	868		BDBOS	Unknown	Unknown	
262	869		TKÜV-Netzanbindungen	Unknown	Unknown	
262	92		Nash Technologies	Not operational	GSM 1800 / UMTS 2100	Test network; MNC withdrawn
262	98		private networks	operational	5G 3500	non-public networks

==== Gibraltar (United Kingdom) – GI ====
MCC	MNC	Brand	Operator	Status	Bands (MHz)	References and notes
266	01	GibTel	Gibtelecom	Operational	GSM 900 / GSM 1800 / UMTS 2100 / LTE 800 / LTE 1800 / LTE 2600	
266	03	Gibfibrespeed	GibFibre Ltd	Unknown	Unknown	
266	04	MCOM	Melmasti Global (Gibraltar) Ltd	Unknown	Unknown	
266	06	CTS Mobile	CTS Gibraltar	Not operational	UMTS 2100	licence withdrawn in February 2013
266	09	Shine	Eazitelecom	Not operational	GSM 1800 / UMTS 2100	shut down May 2016

==== Greece – GR ====
MCC	MNC	Brand	Operator	Status	Bands (MHz)	References and notes
202	00		Inter Telecom	Operational	MVNO	
202	01	Cosmote	OTE	Operational	GSM 900 / LTE 800 / LTE 1800 / LTE 2600 / 5G 700 / 5G 1800 / 5G 2100 / 5G 3500	UMTS shut down Dec 2021
202	02	Cosmote	OTE	Operational	GSM 900 / LTE 800 / LTE 1800 / LTE 2600 / 5G 700 / 5G 1800 / 5G 2100 / 5G 3500	UMTS shut down Dec 2021
202	03		OTE	Unknown	Unknown	
202	04		OSE	Unknown	GSM-R	Former EDISY
202	05	Vodafone	Vodafone Greece	Operational	GSM 900 / GSM 1800 / LTE 800 / LTE 1800 / LTE 2600 / 5G 3500	former PanaFon; UMTS shut down mid 2023
202	06		Vodafone Greece	Unknown	Unknown	Former Cosmoline
202	07		AMD Telecom	Unknown	Unknown	
202	08		RC	Unknown	Unknown	
202	09	NOVA	NOVA	Operational	GSM 900 / LTE 800 / LTE 1800 / LTE 2100 / LTE 2600 / 5G 2100 / 5G 3500	former Q-Telecom, WIND Hellas; UMTS shut down Mar 2023
202	10	NOVA	NOVA	Operational	GSM 900 / LTE 800 / LTE 1800 / LTE 2100 / LTE 2600 / 5G 2100 / 5G 3500	former Telestet, TIM, WIND Hellas; UMTS shut down Mar 2023
202	11		interConnect	Not operational	Unknown	MNC withdrawn
202	12		Yuboto	Not operational	MVNO	MNC withdrawn
202	13		Compatel Limited	Not operational	Unknown	MNC withdrawn
202	14		Vodafone Greece	Unknown	Unknown	Former Cyta Hellas
202	15		BWS	Not operational	Unknown	MNC withdrawn
202	16		interConnect	Unknown	Unknown	Former Inter Telecom
202	17	NOVA	NOVA	Unknown	Unknown	
202	21		Cell Mobile	Unknown	Unknown	

==== Greenland (Kingdom of Denmark) – GL ====
MCC	MNC	Brand	Operator	Status	Bands (MHz)	References and notes
290	01	tusass	Tusass A/S	Operational	GSM 900 / UMTS 900 / LTE 800 / 5G	Former TELE Greenland; 5G for fixed wireless; UMTS to be shut down in 2023
290	02	Nanoq Media	inu:it a/s	Operational	TD-LTE 2500	Former Nuuk TV
290	03	Tuullik mobile data	GTV Greenland	Operational	LTE 700	Tuullik Mobile data

==== Guernsey (United Kingdom) – GG ====
MCC	MNC	Brand	Operator	Status	Bands (MHz)	References and notes
234	03	Airtel-Vodafone	Guernsey Airtel Ltd	Operational	GSM 1800 / UMTS 2100 / LTE 800 / LTE 1800 / LTE 2600	
234	50	JT	JT Group Limited	Operational	GSM 1800 / UMTS 900 / UMTS 2100 / LTE 800 / LTE 1800 / LTE 2600	former Wave Telecom
234	55	Sure Mobile	Sure (Guernsey) Limited	Operational	GSM 900 / UMTS 900 / / UMTS 2100 / LTE 800 / LTE 1800 / LTE 2600	former Cable & Wireless

=== H ===
==== Hungary – HU ====
MCC	MNC	Brand	Operator	Status	Bands (MHz)	References and notes
216	01	Yettel Hungary	Telenor Magyarország Zrt.	Operational	GSM 900 / GSM 1800 / LTE 800 / LTE 1800 / LTE 2600 / 5G 700 / 5G 2100 / 5G 3500	Former Pannon; MNC has not the same numerical value as the area code; UMTS shut down Nov 2023
216	02		HM EI Zrt.	Operational	LTE 450	Former MVM Net; for government use
216	03	one	One Hungary Ltd.	Operational	LTE 1800 / TD-LTE 3700	Former DIGI
216	04		Pro-M PrCo. Ltd.	Unknown	Unknown	Former Invitech ICT Services Ltd.
216	20	Yettel Hungary	Telenor Magyarország Zrt.	Unknown	Unknown	
216	25	Yettel Hungary	Telenor Magyarország Zrt.	Unknown	Unknown	
216	30	Telekom	Magyar Telekom Plc	Operational	GSM 900 / GSM 1800 / LTE 800 / LTE 1800 / LTE 2600 / 5G 700 / 5G 2100 / 5G 3500	Former Westel; MNC has the same numerical value as the area code; UMTS shut down June 2022
216	70	one	One Hungary Ltd.	Operational	GSM 900 / LTE 800 / LTE 1800 / LTE 2600 / 5G 700 / 5G 2100 / 5G 3500	Former Vodafone Magyarország Zrt.; MNC has the same numerical value as the area code; UMTS shut down Mar 2023
216	71	one	One Hungary Ltd.	Operational	MVNO	Former UPC Hungary
216	99	MAV GSM-R	MÁV Infrastructure Co. Ltd.	Operational	GSM-R 900	Railway communications

=== I ===
==== Iceland – IS ====
MCC	MNC	Brand	Operator	Status	Bands (MHz)	References and notes
274	01	Síminn	Iceland Telecom	Operational	UMTS 900 / UMTS 2100 / LTE 1800 / LTE 2600 / 5G 3500	Former Landssimi hf; GSM shut down Jan 2026
274	02	Sýn	Sýn	Operational	UMTS 2100 / LTE 800 / LTE 1800 / LTE 2100	Former Islandssimi, Vodafone; GSM shut down June 2025
274	03	Sýn	Sýn	Not operational	Unknown	Former Islandssimi ehf; MNC withdrawn
274	04	Viking	IMC Island ehf	Not operational	GSM 1800	MNC withdrawn
274	05		Halló Frjáls fjarskipti hf.	Not operational	GSM 1800	MNC withdrawn
274	06		Núll níu ehf	Not operational	Unknown	MNC withdrawn
274	07	IceCell	IceCell ehf	Not operational	GSM 1800	Network only partially built; MNC withdrawn
274	08	On-waves	Iceland Telecom	Operational	GSM 900 / GSM 1800	On ferries and cruise ships
274	11	Nova	Nova ehf	Operational	UMTS 2100 / LTE 800 / LTE 1800 / LTE 2100 / 5G 3500	GSM shut down Jan 2025
274	12	Tal	IP fjarskipti	Operational	MVNO	
274	16		Tismi BV	Unknown	Unknown	
274	22		Landhelgisgæslan (Icelandic Coast Guard)	Unknown	Unknown	
274	31	Síminn	Iceland Telecom	Unknown	Unknown	
274	91		Neyðarlínan	Operational	Tetra	

==== Ireland – IE ====
MCC	MNC	Brand	Operator	Status	Bands (MHz)	References and notes
272	01	Vodafone	Vodafone Ireland	Operational	GSM 900 / GSM 1800 / LTE 800 / LTE 1800 / 5G 2100 / 5G 3500	UMTS shut down Oct 2024
272	02	3	Three Ireland Services (Hutchison) Ltd	Operational	GSM 900	Former Telefónica O_{2}, UMTS shut down 2024
272	03	Eir	Eir Group plc	Operational	GSM 900 / LTE 800 / LTE 1800 / LTE 2100 / 5G 1800 / 5G 3500	Former Meteor, UMTS shut down Oct 2026
272	04		Access Telecom	Unknown	Unknown	
272	05	3	Three Ireland (Hutchison) Ltd	Operational	GSM 900 / LTE 800 / LTE 1800 / LTE 2100 / LTE 2600 / 5G 1800 / 5G 3500	UMTS shut down 2024
272	07	Eir	Eir Group plc	Operational	GSM 900	Former eMobile, UMTS shut down Oct 2026
272	08	Eir	Eir Group plc	Unknown	Unknown	
272	09		Clever Communications Ltd.	Not operational	Unknown	MNC withdrawn
272	11	Tesco Mobile	Liffey Telecom	Operational	MVNO	Uses 3
272	13	Lycamobile	Lycamobile	Operational	MVNO	Uses Eir
272	15	Virgin Mobile	UPC	Operational	MVNO	Former upc
272	16	iD Mobile	Carphone Warehouse	Not operational	MVNO	
272	17	3	Three Ireland (Hutchison) Ltd	Unknown	Unknown	
272	18		Cubic Telecom Limited	Operational	MVNO	
272	21		Net Feasa Limited	Operational	MVNO	Internet of things
272	25	Sky Mobile	Sky Ireland	Operational	MVNO	Uses Vodafone
272	26	Vodafone	Vodafone Ireland	Unknown	Unknown	
272	27		TP Ireland Operations Limited	Unknown	Unknown	
272	42	Imagine	Imagine Communications	Operational	Unknown	
272	68		Office of the Government Chief Information Officer	Unknown	Unknown	

==== Isle of Man (United Kingdom) – IM ====
MCC	MNC	Brand	Operator	Status	Bands (MHz)	References and notes
234	18	Cloud 9 Mobile	Cloud 9 Mobile Communications PLC	Not operational	GSM 1800 / UMTS 2100	Retired
234	36	Sure Mobile	Sure Isle of Man Ltd.	Operational	GSM 900 / UMTS 900 / UMTS 2100 / LTE 800 / LTE 1800 / LTE 2100	Former Cable & Wireless
234	58	Pronto GSM	Manx Telecom	Operational	GSM 900 / UMTS 2100 / LTE 800 / LTE 1800	
234	73		Bluewave Communications Ltd.	Operational	TD-LTE 3500	

==== Italy – IT ====
The Vatican is served by Italian networks Iliad, TIM, Vodafone and Wind Tre.

MCC	MNC	Brand	Operator	Status	Bands (MHz)	References and notes
222	01	TIM	Telecom Italia S.p.A.	Operational	GSM 900 / LTE 800 / LTE 1500 / LTE 1800 / LTE 2600	UMTS shut down in 2022
222	02	Elsacom		Not operational	Satellite (Globalstar)	Retired
222	04	Intermatica	Intermatica S.p.A.	Unknown	Unknown	
222	05	Telespazio	Telespazio S.p.A.	Unknown	Unknown	
222	06	Vodafone	Vodafone Italia S.p.A.	Operational	Unknown	Unknown
222	07	Kena Mobile	Nòverca S.r.l.	Operational	MVNO	Uses TIM Network
222	08	Fastweb	Fastweb S.p.A.	Operational	MVNO	Uses Vodafone Network
222	10	Vodafone	Vodafone Italia S.p.A.	Operational	GSM 900 / LTE 800 / LTE 1500 / LTE 1800 / LTE 2100 / LTE 2600 / 5G 700 / 5G 2100 / 5G 3500	
222	30	RFI	Ferrovie dello Stato S.p.A.	Operational	GSM-R 900	Railways communication
222	33	PosteMobile	PosteMobile S.p.A.	Operational	MVNO	uses Vodafone Network
222	34	BT Mobile/BT Enìa	BT Italia S.p.A.	Operational	MVNO	uses TIM Network
222	35	Lycamobile	Lycamobile S.r.l.	Operational	MVNO	uses Vodafone Network
222	36	Digi Mobil	Digi Italy S.r.l.	Operational	MVNO	uses Vodafone Network
222	37	Wind Tre	Wind Tre S.p.A.	Unknown	Unknown	Former 3 Italia
222	38	Linkem	Linkem S.p.A.	Operational	TD-LTE 3500 / 5G 3500 / 5G 26000	spectrum shared with GO Internet
222	39	SMS Italia	SMS Group	Unknown	Unknown	
222	41	GO Internet	Tiscali S.p.A.	Operational	TD-LTE 3500 / 5G 3500	spectrum available only in Marche and Emilia-Romagna, roams on Linkem otherwise
222	43	TIM	Telecom Italia S.p.A.	Operational	5G 700 / 5G 2100 / 5G 3500 / 5G 26000	
222	47	Fastweb	Fastweb S.p.A.	Operational	TD-LTE 3500 / 5G 3500 / 5G 26000	Former Tiscali, acquired by Fastweb in 2018
222	48	TIM	Telecom Italia S.p.A.	Unknown	Unknown	
222	49	Vianova	Welcome Italia S.p.A.	Unknown	MVNO	
222	50	Iliad	Iliad Italia S.p.A.	Operational	UMTS 900 / LTE 1800 / LTE 2100 / LTE 2600 / 5G 700 / 5G 3500	
222	53	CoopVoce	Coop Italia S.c.a.r.l.	Operational	MVNO	MNC used from Jan, 2020
222	54	Plintron	Plintron Italy S.r.l.	Operational	MVNO	Operates only as MVNE for Rabona, NoiTel and NT Mobile on Vodafone network
222	56	spusu	MASS Response Service GmbH	Operational	MVNO	
222	77	IPSE 2000		Not operational	UMTS 2100	Retired
222	88	Wind Tre	Wind Tre S.p.A.	Operational	GSM 900 / UMTS 900 / LTE 800 / LTE 1800 / LTE 2100 / LTE 2600 / 5G 1800 / 5G 2600 / 5G 3500	Former Wind; UMTS 2100 shutdown Aug 2024
222	98	Blu	Blu S.p.A.	Not operational	GSM 900	
222	99	Wind Tre	Wind Tre S.p.A.	Operational	UMTS 900 / LTE 800 / LTE 1800 / LTE 2100 / LTE 2600	Former 3 Italy; UMTS 2100 shutdown Aug 2024

=== J ===
==== Jersey (United Kingdom) – JE ====
MCC	MNC	Brand	Operator	Status	Bands (MHz)	References and notes
234	03	Airtel-Vodafone	Jersey Airtel Limited	Operational	GSM 900 / GSM 1800 / UMTS 2100 / LTE 800 / LTE 1800	
234	28		Marathon Telecom Limited	Not operational	UMTS 2100	holds license but not network built
234	50	JT	JT Group Limited	Operational	GSM 900 / GSM 1800 / UMTS 900 / UMTS 2100 / LTE 800 / LTE 1800 / LTE 2600	
234	55	Sure Mobile	Sure (Jersey) Limited	Operational	GSM 900 / GSM 1800 / UMTS 2100 / LTE 800 / LTE 1800	former Cable & Wireless

=== K ===
==== Kosovo – XK ====
MCC	MNC	Brand	Operator	Status	Bands (MHz)	References and notes
221	01	Vala	Telecom of Kosovo J.S.C.	Operational	GSM 900 / GSM 1800 / UMTS 900 / LTE 1800	Previously the Monaco MCC/MNC 212-01 was used.
221	02	IPKO	IPKO	Operational	GSM 900 / UMTS 900 / LTE 1800	Previously the Slovenian MCC/MNC 293-41 was used. Used by MVNO D3 Mobile.
221	06	Z Mobile	Dardaphone.Net LLC	Not operational	MVNO	Previously the Monaco MCC/MNC 212-01 was used; MNC withdrawn
221	07	D3 Mobile	Dukagjini Telecommunications LLC	Operational	MVNO	

=== L ===
==== Latvia – LV ====
MCC	MNC	Brand	Operator	Status	Bands (MHz)	References and notes
247	01	LMT	Latvian Mobile Telephone	Operational	GSM 900 / GSM 1800 / LTE 1800 / LTE 2600 / 5G 3500	UMTS shut down Mar 2025
247	02	Tele2	Tele2	Operational	GSM 900 / GSM 1800 / LTE 800 / LTE 1800 / LTE 2600 / 5G 700 / 5G 3500	UMTS shut down Mar 2025
247	03	TRIATEL	Telekom Baltija	Operational	CDMA 450	
247	04		Beta Telecom	Not operational	Unknown	Former Lattelecom; MNC withdrawn
247	05	Bite	Bite Latvija	Operational	GSM 900 / GSM 1800 / LTE 800 / LTE 1800 / LTE 2600 / 5G 3500	Bite's postpaid customers are still being assigned SIM cards with 246 02 MNC; UMTS shut down Mar 2026
247	06	Bite	Bite Latvija	Unknown	Unknown	Former Rigatta, UNISTARS
247	07		SIA "MEGATEL"	Not operational	MVNO	Former Master Telecom; MNC withdrawn
247	08	VMT	SIA "VENTAmobile"	Operational	MVNO	Former IZZI
247	09	Xomobile	Camel Mobile	Operational	MVNO	Former Global Mobile Solutions
247	10	LMT	Latvian Mobile Telephone	Unknown	Unknown	
247	11	LMT	Latvian Mobile Telephone	Unknown	Unknown	

==== Liechtenstein – LI ====
MCC	MNC	Brand	Operator	Status	Bands (MHz)	References and notes
295	01	Swisscom	Swisscom Schweiz AG	Operational	GSM 900 / GSM 1800 / UMTS 2100 / LTE 1800	Also uses MCC 228 MNC 01 (Switzerland)
295	02	7acht	Salt Liechtenstein AG	Operational	GSM 900 / GSM 1800 / UMTS 2100 / LTE 1800	Former Orange
295	05	FL1	Telecom Liechtenstein AG	Operational	GSM 900 / UMTS 2100 / LTE 800	Former Mobilkom
295	06	Cubic Telecom	Cubic Telecom AG	Operational	MVNO	
295	07		First Mobile AG	Not operational	MVNO	MNC withdrawn
295	09		EMnify GmbH	Unknown	MVNO	
295	10		Soracom LI Ltd.	Unknown	MVNO	
295	11		iBASIS Communications AG	Unknown	MVNO	Former DIMOCO
295	77	Alpmobil	Alpcom AG	Not operational	GSM 900	Bankruptcy in February 2012, former Tele2, MNC withdrawn

==== Lithuania – LT ====
MCC	MNC	Brand	Operator	Status	Bands (MHz)	References and notes
246	01	Telia	Telia Lietuva	Operational	GSM 900 / GSM 1800 / LTE 700 / LTE 800 / LTE 900 / LTE 1800 / LTE 2100 / LTE 2600 / 5G 700 / 5G 2100 / 5G 3500	Former Omnitel; UMTS 2100 shut down Dec 2020, UMTS 900 - Dec 2022
246	02	BITĖ	UAB Bitė Lietuva	Operational	GSM 900 / LTE 700 / LTE 800 / LTE 1800 / LTE 2100 / LTE 2300 TDD / LTE 2600 TDD / LTE 2600 FDD / 5G 2300 / 5G 2600 TDD / 5G 3500	UMTS shut down Dec 2025
246	03	Tele2	UAB Tele2 (Tele2 AB, Sweden)	Operational	GSM 900 / GSM 1800 / LTE 700 / LTE 800 / LTE 900 / LTE 1800 / LTE 2100 / LTE 2600 / 5G 700 / 5G 3500	(in Vodafone partnership) UMTS shut down Mar 2025
246	04		Informatikos ir ryšių departamentas prie LR vidaus reikalų ministerija (Ministry of the Interior)	Unknown	Unknown	
246	05	LTG Infra	Lietuvos geležinkeliai (Lithuanian Railways)	Operational	GSM-R 900	
246	06	Mediafon	UAB Mediafon	Operational	Unknown	
246	07		Compatel Ltd.	Unknown	Unknown	
246	08	MEZON	UAB Bitė Lietuva	Not Operational	WiMAX 3500 / TD-LTE 2300 / 5G 2300	former MEZON which got bought and merged with Bitė.
246	09		Interactive Digital Media GmbH	Not operational	Unknown	MNC withdrawn
246	11		DATASIM OU	Not operational	Unknown	MNC withdrawn
246	12		Nord connect OU	Unknown	Unknown	
246	13		Travel Communication SIA	Unknown	Unknown	
246	14		Tismi BV	Not operational	Unknown	MNC withdrawn
246	15		Esim telecom, UAB	Not operational	Unknown	MNC withdrawn
246	16		Annecto Telecom Limited	Unknown	Unknown	

==== Luxembourg – LU ====
MCC	MNC	Brand	Operator	Status	Bands (MHz)	References and notes
270	01	POST	POST Luxembourg	Operational	GSM 900 / GSM 1800 / LTE 1800 / 5G 700 / 5G 3500	Former LuxGSM (P&T Luxembourg); UMTS shut down Oct 2022
270	02		MTX Connect S.à r.l.	Operational	MVNO	Also private LTE
270	05		Luxembourg Online S.A.	Unknown	Unknown	
270	07		Bouygues Telecom S.A.	Unknown	Unknown	MNC also used in France
270	10		Blue Communications	Unknown	Unknown	
270	71	CFL	Société Nationale des Chemins de Fer Luxembourgeois	Operational	GSM-R 900	
270	77	Tango	Tango SA	Operational	GSM 900 / GSM 1800 / LTE 800 / LTE 1800 / 5G 700 / 5G 3500	MNC also used in Belgium; UMTS shut down Jan 2024
270	78		Interactive digital media GmbH	Unknown	Unknown	
270	79		Mitto AG	Unknown	Unknown	
270	80		Syniverse Technologies S.à r.l.	Unknown	Unknown	
270	81		E-Lux Mobile Telecommunication S.A.	Unknown	Unknown	
270	99	Orange	Orange S.A.	Operational	GSM 900 / GSM 1800 / LTE 1800 / 5G 700 / 5G 3500	Former VOXmobile; MNC also used in Belgium; UMTS shut down Dec 2025

=== M ===
==== Malta – MT ====
MCC	MNC	Brand	Operator	Status	Bands (MHz)	References and notes
278	01	Epic	Epic	Operational	GSM 900 / UMTS 2100 / LTE 1800 / 5G	Former Vodafone; supports MVNOs Redtouch Fone and VFC Mobile
278	11		YOM Ltd.	Not operational	MVNO	MNC withdrawn
278	21	GO	Mobile Communications Limited	Operational	GSM 900 / UMTS 2100 / LTE 800 / LTE 1800 / 5G	Supports MVNO PING
278	30	GO	Mobile Communications Limited	Unknown	Unknown	
278	77	Melita	Melita	Operational	UMTS 900 / UMTS 2100 / LTE 800 / LTE 2100 / 5G	

==== Moldova – MD ====
MCC	MNC	Brand	Operator	Status	Bands (MHz)	References and notes
255	00	IDC	Interdnestrcom	Not operational	CDMA 800	Used Ukrainian MCC; CDMA 450 shut down Sep 2020, CDMA 800 in Aug 2023
259	01	Orange	Orange Moldova	Operational	GSM 900 / GSM 1800 / UMTS 2100 / LTE 800 / LTE 1800 / LTE 2600 / 5G 2100 / 5G 3500	Former Voxtel
259	02	Moldcell	Moldcell	Operational	GSM 900 / GSM 1800 / UMTS 2100 / LTE 1800 / LTE 2600 / 5G 2100	
259	03	Moldtelecom	Moldtelecom	Operational	CDMA 450	
259	04	Eventis	Eventis Telecom	Not operational	GSM 900 / GSM 1800	Bankruptcy - License suspended
259	05	Moldtelecom	Moldtelecom	Operational	UMTS 900 / UMTS 2100 / LTE 1800	Former Unité
259	15	IDC	Interdnestrcom	Operational	LTE 800 / LTE 1800	
259	99	Moldtelecom	Moldtelecom	Operational	UMTS 2100	Former Unité; used for Femtocell service only

==== Monaco – MC ====
MCC	MNC	Brand	Operator	Status	Bands (MHz)	References and notes
212	10	Monaco Telecom	Monaco Telecom	Operational	GSM 1800 / UMTS 900 / UMTS 2100 / LTE 800 / LTE 1800 / LTE 2600 / 5G 3500	Was Used for the Vala network in Kosovo. The GSM Association lists the PTK (P&T Kosovo) website for this network.

==== Montenegro – ME ====
MCC	MNC	Brand	Operator	Status	Bands (MHz)	References and notes
297	01	One	One Montenegro	Operational	GSM 900 / GSM 1800 / UMTS 2100 / LTE 1800 / 5G 2100	Former ProMonte GSM, Telenor
297	02	telekom.me	Crnogorski Telekom	Operational	GSM 900 / GSM 1800 / LTE 800 / LTE 1800 / LTE 2600 / 5G 3500	Former MoNet; UMTS shut down Jan 2024
297	03	m:tel	m:tel Crna Gora	Operational	GSM 900 / GSM 1800 / UMTS 2100 / LTE	Owned by Telekom Srbija

=== N ===
==== Netherlands (Kingdom of the Netherlands) – NL ====
MCC	MNC	Brand	Operator	Status	Bands (MHz)	References and notes
204	00		Intovoice B.V.	Unknown	Unknown	
204	01		RadioAccess Network Services	Not operational	Unknown	MNC withdrawn
204	02	Odido	T-Mobile Netherlands B.V	Operational	LTE 800 / LTE 2600	Former Tele2
204	03	Enreach	Enreach Netherlands B.V.	Operational	MVNE	
204	04	Vodafone	Vodafone Libertel B.V.	Operational	GSM 900 / LTE 800 / LTE 1800 / LTE 2100 / LTE 2600 / 5G 1800	UMTS shut down February 2020
204	05		Elephant Talk Communications Premium Rate Services	Not operational	Unknown	MNC withdrawn
204	06		Private Mobility Nederland B.V.	Unknown	MVNO	Former Mundio Mobile
204	07	Teleena	Tata Communications MOVE B.V.	Operational	MVNO	
204	08	KPN	KPN Mobile The Netherlands B.V.	Operational	GSM 900 / LTE 800 / LTE 1800 / LTE 2100 / LTE 2600 / TD-LTE 2600 / 5G 700	UMTS shut down May 2023
204	09	Lycamobile	Lycamobile Netherlands Limited	Operational	MVNO	
204	10	KPN	KPN B.V.	Operational	GSM 900 / LTE 800 / LTE 1800 / LTE 2600	UMTS shut down May 2023
204	11		Greenet Netwerk B.V	Operational	LTE	Former VoipIT B.V., MNC withdrawn; private networks
204	12	Telfort	KPN Mobile The Netherlands B.V.	Operational	MVNO	Subbrand of KPN
204	13		Unica Installatietechniek B.V.	Unknown	Unknown	
204	14		Venus & Mercury Telecom	Unknown	5G	Former 6GMOBILE B.V.
204	15	Ziggo	Ziggo B.V.	Operational	LTE 2600	business users only
204	16	Odido	T-Mobile Netherlands B.V	Operational	UMTS 900 / UMTS 2100 / LTE 800 / LTE 900 / LTE 1800 / LTE 2100 / LTE 2600 / TD-LTE 2600 / 5G 700	also used by MVNO Ben; GSM shut down Jun 2023
204	17		Lebara Ltd	Operational	MVNO	Former Intercity Mobile Communications
204	18	Ziggo	Ziggo Services B.V.	Operational	MVNO	Former UPC Netherlands
204	19		Mixe Communication Solutions B.V.	Unknown	Unknown	
204	20	Odido	T-Mobile Netherlands B.V	Operational	UMTS 900 / UMTS 2100 / LTE 800 / LTE 900 / LTE 1800 / LTE 2100 / LTE 2600 / TD-LTE 2600 / 5G 700	Former Orange Netherlands; GSM shut down Jun 2023
204	21		ProRail B.V.	Operational	GSM-R 900	
204	22		Ministerie van Defensie	Unknown	Unknown	
204	23		KORE Wireless Nederland B.V.	Operational	MVNO	Former ASPIDER Solutions, Wyless
204	24		PM Factory B.V.	Unknown	Unknown	
204	25		CapX B.V.	Operational	GSM 1800	Private networks
204	26		SpeakUp B.V.	Unknown	Unknown	
204	27	L-mobi	L-Mobi Mobile B.V.	Operational	MVNO	Former Breezz Nederland B.V.
204	28		Lancelot B.V.	Unknown	Unknown	
204	29		Tismi B.V.	Unknown	Unknown	Former Private Mobile Ltd
204	30		ASpider Solutions Nederland B.V.	Unknown	Unknown	
204	32		Cubic Telecom Limited	Unknown	Unknown	
204	33		Truphone B.V.	Operational	MVNO	
204	60		Nextgen Mobile Ltd	Not operational	Unknown	MNC withdrawn
204	61		Alcadis B.V.	Unknown	Unknown	Former BodyTrace Netherlands B.V.
204	62	RGTN	RGTN Wholesale Netherlands B.V.	Operational	MVNO	Former Voxbone; used for Signalling Connection Control Part and two-way SMS services
204	63		Messagebird BV	Unknown	Unknown	
204	64		Zetacom B.V.	Unknown	Unknown	
204	65		AGMS Netherlands B.V.	Not operational	Unknown	MNC withdrawn
204	66		Utility Connect B.V.	Operational	CDMA 450	Subsidiary of Alliander; network operated by KPN
204	67		Koning en Hartman B.V.	Operational	GSM 1800, LTE, 5G	MNC was withdrawn, officially restated April 7, 2025 by ACM
204	68		Roamware (Netherlands) B.V.	Not operational	Unknown	MNC withdrawn
204	69		KPN Mobile The Netherlands B.V.	Unknown	Unknown	
204	91		Enexis Netbeheer B.V.	Unknown	Unknown	

==== North Macedonia – MK ====
MCC	MNC	Brand	Operator	Status	Bands (MHz)	References and notes
294	01	Telekom.mk	Makedonski Telekom	Operational	GSM 900 / GSM 1800 / LTE 800 / LTE 1800 / LTE 2100 / 5G 700 / 5G 2100 / 5G 3500	Former Mobimak; UMTS shut down Mar 2024
294	02	one	one	Not operational	GSM 900 / UMTS 2100 / LTE 800 / LTE 1800	Former Cosmofon, One (Telekom Slovenija Group)
294	03	A1 MK	A1 Macedonia DOOEL	Operational	GSM 900 / GSM 1800 / UMTS 900 / LTE 800 / LTE 1800 / LTE 2100	Former VipOperator; merged with One in 2015 and renamed to one.vip; renamed to A1 MK in 2019
294	04	Lycamobile	Lycamobile LLC	Operational	MVNO	Uses A1 network
294	10		WTI Macedonia	Not operational	Unknown	
294	11		MOBIK TELEKOMUNIKACII DOOEL Skopje	Unknown	Unknown	
294	12		MTEL DOOEL Skopje	Unknown	Unknown	

==== Norway – NO ====
MCC	MNC	Brand	Operator	Status	Bands (MHz)	References and notes
242	01	Telenor	Telenor Norge AS	Operational	GSM 900 / GSM 1800 / LTE 800 / LTE 1800 / LTE 2600 / 5G 3500	UMTS shut down 2021, GSM to shut down 2025
242	02	Telia	Telia Norge AS	Operational	LTE 800 / LTE 1800 / LTE 2600 / 5G 700 / 5G 3500	Former NetCom; UMTS shut down Dec 2021, GSM Dec 2025
242	03		Televerket AS	Not operational	Unknown	MNC withdrawn
242	04	Tele2	Tele2 (Mobile Norway AS)	Not operational	MVNO	MNC withdrawn
242	05	OneCall / MyCall	Telia Norge AS	Operational	MVNO	Former Tele2; uses Telia network
242	06	ice	Lyse Tele AS	Operational	LTE 450	Former Nordisk Mobiltelefon; data services only
242	07	Phonero	Phonero AS	Not operational	MVNO	Former Ventelo; MNC withdrawn
242	08	Telia	Telia Norge AS	Operational	MVNO	Former TDC
242	09	Com4	Com4 AS	Operational	MVNO	Principally M2M services
242	10		Nasjonal kommunikasjonsmyndighet	Unknown	Unknown	
242	11	SystemNet	SystemNet AS	Not operational	Test	MNC withdrawn
242	12	Telenor	Telenor Norge AS	Unknown	Unknown	
242	13		IXT AS	Unknown	MVNO	
242	14	ice	Lyse Tele AS	Operational	GSM 900 / LTE 800 / LTE 1800 / LTE 2100 / 5G 700 / 5G 2100	UMTS shut down Jan 2021
242	15		eRate Norway AS	Operational	MVNO	
242	16		Iristel Norway AS	Unknown	Unknown	
242	17	Telenor	Telenor Norge AS	Unknown	Unknown	
242	20		Jernbaneverket AS	Operational	GSM-R 900	
242	21		Jernbaneverket AS	Operational	GSM-R 900	
242	22		Lyse Tele AS	Unknown	Unknown	Former Network Norway, Altibox;
242	23	Lycamobile	Lyca Mobile Ltd	Operational	MVNO	
242	24		Mobile Norway AS	Not operational	Unknown	MNC withdrawn
242	25	CYFOR	Cyberforsvaret	Unknown	Unknown	
242	70		test networks	Unknown	Unknown	Can be used without application
242	71		private networks	Unknown	5G 3700	Band n77
242	72		private networks	Unknown	5G 3700	Band n77
242	73		private networks	Unknown	Unknown	
242	74		private networks	Unknown	Unknown	
242	75		private networks	Unknown	Unknown	
242	90		Nokia Solutions and Networks Norge AS	Unknown	Unknown	
242	99		TampNet AS	Operational	LTE 800 / LTE 1800	Offshore

=== P ===
==== Poland – PL ====
MCC	MNC	Brand	Operator	Status	Bands (MHz)	References and notes
260	01	Plus	Polkomtel Sp. z o.o.	Operational	GSM 900 / GSM 1800 / UMTS 900 / UMTS 2100 / LTE 900 / LTE 1800 / LTE 2100 / LTE 2600 / 5G 700 / 5G 2100 / 5G 2500 / 5G 3500	
260	02	T-Mobile	T-Mobile Polska S.A.	Operational	GSM 900 / GSM 1800 / LTE 900 / LTE 1800 / LTE 2100 / 5G 700 / 5G 2100 / 5G 3500	former Era; see MNC 260-34 for shared LTE network; UMTS shut down Apr 2023
260	03	Orange	Orange Polska S.A.	Operational	GSM 900 / LTE 1800 / LTE 2100 / 5G 700 / 5G 2100 / 5G 3500	former Idea; see MNC 260-34 for shared LTE network; CDMA 450 shut down April 2017, UMTS shut down Dec 2025
260	04	Plus	Polkomtel Sp. z o.o.	Not operational	Unknown	former CenterNet, Aero2
260	05	Orange	Orange Polska S.A.	Not operational	UMTS 2100	not in use, using MNC 03
260	06	Play	P4 Sp. z o.o.	Operational	GSM 1800 / UMTS 900 / LTE 800 / LTE 1800 / LTE 2100 / LTE 2600 / 5G 700 / 5G 2100 / 5G 3500	Also roaming on Polkomtel and Orange 2G network
260	07	Netia	Netia S.A.	Operational	MVNO	MVNO on Play (P4)
260	08		EXATEL S.A.	Unknown	Unknown	Former E-Telko Sp. z o.o.
260	09	Lycamobile	Lycamobile Sp. z o.o.	Operational	MVNO	On Polkomtel 2G/3G network
260	10	T-Mobile	T-Mobile Polska S.A.	Unknown	Unknown	former Telefony Opalenickie S.A., Sferia; CDMA 800 shut down in 2014; LTE 800 leased to Aero 2;
260	11	Plus	Polkomtel Sp. z o.o.	Operational	CDMA 420	Former Nordisk Polska
260	12	Cyfrowy Polsat	Cyfrowy Polsat S.A.	Operational	MVNO	MVNO on Polkomtel
260	13		Move Telecom S.A.	Operational	MVNO	Former Sferia
260	14		Telco Leaders Ltd	Unknown	Unknown	Former Sferia
260	15	Plus	Polkomtel Sp. z o.o.	Operational	LTE 1800	former CenterNet, Aero2; GSM 1800 shut down in 2010
260	16	Plus	Polkomtel Sp. z o.o.	Operational	LTE 1800	former Mobyland, Aero2; GSM 1800 shut down in 2010
260	17	Plus	Polkomtel Sp. z o.o.	Operational	UMTS 900 / TD-LTE 2600	Former Aero2
260	18	AMD Telecom	AMD Telecom S.A.	Unknown	Unknown	
260	19		SIA NetBalt	Unknown	MVNO	Former Teleena Holding BV
260	20		TISMI B.V.	Not operational	Unknown	Former Mobile.Net, Wysyłaj SMS Polska; MNC withdrawn
260	21		private networks	Unknown	Unknown	Former Exteri until May 2014; now used for several private networks with 4-digit MNC 21xx
260	22		Twilio Ireland Limited	Unknown	Unknown	Former Arcomm until Nov 2018
260	23		PGE Systemy S.A.	Unknown	Unknown	Former Amicomm
260	24		IT Partners Telco Sp. z o.o.	Unknown	Unknown	former WideNet
260	25		thulium Sp. z o.o.	Unknown	Unknown	Former Best Solutions & Technology Experience, Polskie Sieci Radiowe, Claude ICT/TeleCube
260	26	T-Mobile	T-Mobile Polska S.A.	Unknown	Unknown	Former Advanced Technology & Experience (ATE), Vonage
260	27		SIA Ntel Solutions	Unknown	Unknown	Former Intertelcom
260	28		CrossMobile Sp. z o.o.	Unknown	Unknown	Former PhoneNet until 2016
260	29		SMSWIZARD POLSKA Sp. z o.o.	Unknown	Unknown	Former Interfonica Sp. z o.o.
260	30	T-Mobile	T-Mobile Polska S.A.	Unknown	Unknown	Former GrandTel, HXG
260	31	T-Mobile	T-Mobile Polska S.A.	Unknown	Unknown	Former Phone IT
260	32		Compatel Limited	Unknown	Unknown	
260	33		1Global Operations	Operational	MVNO	Former Truphone
260	34	NetWorkS!	T-Mobile Polska S.A.	Operational	LTE 800 / LTE 2600	Shared network T-Mobile / Orange
260	35		PKP Polskie Linie Kolejowe S.A.	Operational	GSM-R	
260	36		YATECO OÜ	Unknown	Unknown	Former Vectone/Mundio
260	37		Lancelot B.V.	Unknown	Unknown	Former NEXTGEN MOBILE
260	38		Premium Routing GmbH	Unknown	Unknown	Former CALLFREEDOM
260	39	Voxbone	VOXBONE SA	Operational	MVNO	
260	40	Orange	Orange Polska S.A.	Unknown	Unknown	Former Interactive Digital Media
260	41		EZ PHONE MOBILE Sp. z o.o.	Unknown	Unknown	
260	42	T-Mobile	T-Mobile Polska S.A.	Unknown	Unknown	Former MobiWeb Telecom
260	43		Smart Idea International Sp. z o.o.	Unknown	Unknown	
260	44	Orange	Orange Polska S.A.	Unknown	Unknown	Former Rebtel Poland
260	45	Virgin Mobile	P4 Sp. z o.o.	Operational	MVNO	
260	46	Orange	Orange Polska S.A.	Unknown	Unknown	Former Terra Telekom
260	47		SMShighway Limited	Unknown	Unknown	
260	48		AGILE TELECOM S.P.A.	Unknown	Unknown	
260	49		Bird B.V.	Unknown	Unknown	Former Messagebird
260	50		eSIM Go Limited	Unknown	Unknown	
260	51		B2B Network UAB	Unknown	Unknown	
260	72		Polkomtel Sp. z o.o.	Unknown	Unknown	
260	73		Polkomtel Sp. z o.o.	Unknown	Unknown	
260	76		Polkomtel Sp. z o.o.	Unknown	Unknown	
260	77		P4 Sp. z o.o.	Unknown	Unknown	
260	78		P4 Sp. z o.o.	Unknown	Unknown	
260	79		P4 Sp. z o.o.	Unknown	Unknown	
260	90		Polska Spółka Gazownictwa Sp. z o.o.	Unknown	Unknown	M2M
260	97		Politechnika Łódzka Uczelniane Centrum Informatyczne	Unknown	Unknown	
260	98	Play	P4 Sp. z o.o.	Not operational	LTE 1800	Test network

==== Portugal – PT ====
MCC	MNC	Brand	Operator	Status	Bands (MHz)	References and notes
268	01	Vodafone	Vodafone Portugal	Operational	GSM 900 / LTE 700 / LTE 800 / LTE 900 / LTE 1800 / LTE 2100 / LTE 2600 / 5G 700 / 5G 3500	formerly Telecel (2001); UMTS shut down Jul 2024
268	02	DIGI PT	Digi Portugal, Lda.	Operational	LTE 900 / LTE 1800 / LTE 2600	formerly MEO
268	03	NOS	NOS Comunicações	Operational	GSM 900 / LTE 800 / LTE 1800 / LTE 2100 / LTE 2600 / 5G 700 / 5G 3500	formerly Optimus (2014); UMTS shut down May 2024
268	04	LycaMobile	LycaMobile	Operational	MVNO	Uses Vodafone network
268	05		Oniway - Inforcomunicaçôes, S.A.	Not operational	UMTS 2100	License withdrawn in 2003; MNC withdrawn
268	06	MEO	MEO - Serviços de Comunicações e Multimédia, S.A.	Operational	GSM 900 / LTE 800 / LTE 900 / LTE 1800 / LTE 2100 / LTE 2600 / 5G 700 / 5G 1800 / 5G 2100 / 5G 3500	formerly TMN (2014); UMTS shut down Jan 2024
268	07		Holafly Portugal, S.A.	Operational	MVNO	formerly Vectone/Mundio, Sumamovil
268	08	MEO	MEO - Serviços de Comunicações e Multimédia, S.A.	Unknown	Unknown	
268	11		Compatel, Limited	Unknown	Unknown	
268	12		Infraestruturas de Portugal, S.A.	Operational	GSM-R	former Refer Telecom, IP Telecom - Serviços de Telecomunicações, S.A.
268	13		G9Telecom, S.A.	Unknown	MVNO	
268	21	Zapp	Zapp Portugal	Not operational	CDMA2000 450	Closed down in September 2011; MNC withdrawn
268	80		E-Redes - Distribuição de Eletricidade, S.A.	Unknown	Unknown	former MEO
268	91	Vodafone	Vodafone Portugal	Unknown	Unknown	
268	92	Vodafone	Vodafone Portugal	Unknown	Unknown	
268	93	NOS	NOS Comunicações	Unknown	Unknown	

=== R ===
==== Romania – RO ====
MCC	MNC	Brand	Operator	Status	Bands (MHz)	References and notes
226	01	Vodafone	Vodafone România	Operational	GSM 900 / LTE 800 / LTE 1800 / LTE 2100 / 5G 2100 / 5G 3500	Former Connex; UMTS shut down Jul 2025
226	02	Clicknet Mobile	Telekom Romania	Not operational	CDMA 420	Licence expired on 1 January 2015
226	03	Telekom	Telekom Romania Mobile	Operational	GSM 900 / GSM 1800 / LTE 800 / LTE 900 / LTE 1800 / LTE 2100 / 5G 2100	Former Cosmote
226	04	Cosmote/Zapp	Telekom Romania Mobile	Not operational	CDMA 450	Licence expired on 24 March 2013
226	05	Digi.Mobil/DIGI	RCS&RDS	Operational	GSM 900 / LTE 800 / LTE 900 / LTE 2100 / LTE 2600 / TD-LTE 2600 / 5G 2600 / 5G 3500	UMTS shut down Aug 2023
226	06	Telekom	Telekom Romania Mobile	Not operational	UMTS 900 / UMTS 2100	Former Zapp; network shut down Mar 2023
226	10	Orange	Orange România	Operational	GSM 900 / LTE 800 / LTE 1800 / LTE 2100 / LTE 2600 / 5G 2100 / 5G 3500	Former Dialog; UMTS shut down Dec 2025
226	11		Enigma-System	Unknown	MVNO	
226	15	Idilis	Idilis	Not operational	WiMAX / TD-LTE 2600	LTE license is sold to RCS&RDS
226	16	Lycamobile	Lycamobile Romania	Not operational	MVNO	Used Telekom Networks, shut down on 31 December 2023.
226	19	CFR	Căile Ferate Române	Operational	GSM-R 900	Dedicated network for safety communication, not for public users.

==== Russian Federation – RU ====
MCC	MNC	Brand	Operator	Status	Bands (MHz)	References and notes
250	01	MTS	Mobile TeleSystems	Operational	GSM 900 / GSM 1800 / UMTS 900 / UMTS 2100 / LTE 800 / LTE 900 / LTE 1800 / LTE 2100 / TD-LTE 2500 / LTE 2600 / TD-LTE 2600 / 5G 2100 / 5G 2600 / 5G 4500	
250	02	MegaFon	MegaFon PJSC	Operational	GSM 900 / GSM 1800 / UMTS 900 / UMTS 2100 / LTE 800 / LTE 900 / LTE 1800 / LTE 2100 / 5G 2100 / LTE 2600 / TD-LTE 2600 / 5G 2100 / 5G 2600 / 5G 4500	Former North-West GSM
250	03	NCC	Nizhegorodskaya Cellular Communications	Not operational	GSM 900 / GSM 1800	Purchased by Tele2
250	04	Sibchallenge	Sibchallenge	Not operational	GSM 900	
250	05	ETK	Yeniseytelecom	Not operational	GSM 900 / GSM 1800 / UMTS 2100 / CDMA 450	Purchased by Tele2
250	06	Skylink	CJSC Saratov System of Cellular Communications	Not operational	CDMA 450	
250	07	SMARTS	Zao SMARTS	Not operational	GSM 900 / GSM 1800	
250	08	Vainah Telecom	CS "VainahTelecom"	Operational	GSM 900 / GSM 1800 / TD-LTE 2300	
250	09	Skylink	Khabarovsky Cellular Phone	Operational	CDMA 450	
250	10	DTC	Dontelekom	Not operational	GSM 900	
250	11	Yota	Scartel	Operational	MVNO	
250	12	Baykalwestcom	Baykal Westcom / New Telephone Company / Far Eastern Cellular	Not operational	GSM 900 / GSM 1800 / CDMA 450	
250	12	Akos		Not operational	GSM 1800	
250	13	KUGSM	Kuban GSM	Not operational	GSM 900 / GSM 1800	
250	14	MegaFon	MegaFon OJSC	Not operational	GSM 900 / GSM 1800 / UMTS 900 / UMTS 2100 / TD-LTE 2600	
250	15	SMARTS	SMARTS Ufa, SMARTS Uljanovsk	Not operational	GSM 1800	
250	16	Miatel	Miatel	Operational	MVNO	Previously used by NTC until 2013
250	17	Utel	JSC Uralsvyazinform	Not operational	GSM 900 / GSM 1800	Former Ermak RMS
250	18	12.ru	Astran	Operational	MVNO	Previously used Osnova Telecom
250	19	Alfa-Mobile	Alfa-Bank	Operational	MVNO on Beeline base	Previously used Indigo. Since 19 December 2009 merged with Tele2
250	20	t2	Rostelecom	Operational	GSM 900 / GSM 1800 / UMTS 2100 / LTE 450 / LTE 800 / LTE 1800 / TD-LTE 2300 / TD-LTE 2500 / LTE 2600 / 5G 4500	Former Tele2 Russia. GSM is not available in Moscow and Moscow Oblast due to lack of license for GSM frequencies
250	21	GlobalTel	JSC "GlobalTel" Archived 2018-06-11 at the Wayback Machine	Operational	Satellite	
250	22		Vainakh Telecom	Operational	TD-LTE 2300	
250	23	Thuraya	GTNT	Operational	Satellite MVNO	Former Mobicom Novosibirsk
250	26	VTB Mobile	VTB Mobile	Operational	MVNO	
250	27	Letai	Tattelecom	Operational	GSM 1800 / LTE 1800	
250	28	Beeline	Beeline	Not operational	GSM 900	Former EXTEL
250	29	Iridium	Iridium Communications	Operational	Satellite MVNO	
250	32	Win Mobile	K-Telecom	Operational	GSM 900 / GSM 1800 / UMTS 2100 / LTE 2600	Unapproved use on Annexed territories only. Works in national roaming outside the unrecognized regions without additional fees.
250	33	Sevmobile	Sevtelekom	Not operational	GSM 900 / GSM 1800 / UMTS 2100 / LTE 1800	Unapproved use on Annexed territories only Network shutdown 2024.
250	34	Krymtelekom	Krymtelekom	Operational	GSM 900 / GSM 1800 / UMTS 2100	Unapproved use on Annexed territories only
250	35	MOTIV	EKATERINBURG-2000	Operational	GSM 1800 / LTE 1800 / TD-LTE 2600	Covers only Sverdlovsk, Kurgan, KMAO and YaNAO regions. Works in national roaming outside the coverage area.
250	37	MCN Mobile	MCN Telecom	Operational	MVNO	Previously used by Kodotel
250	38	Tambov GSM	Central Telecommunication Company	Not operational	GSM 900 / GSM 1800	
250	39	Rostelecom	ROSTELECOM	Not operational	GSM 900 / GSM 1800 / UMTS 2100 / LTE 800 / TD-LTE 2300 / LTE 2600	Tele2 code 250 20 is used since acquiring
250	40	VTC Mobile	Voentelecom	Operational	MVNO	
250	44		Stavtelesot / North Caucasian GSM	Not operational	Unknown	
250	45	Gazprombank Mobile	PJSC New Mobile Communications	Operational	MVNO	
250	50	SberMobile	Sberbank-Telecom	Operational	MVNO	
250	54	Miranda-Media	Miranda-Media	Operational	GSM 900 / UMTS 2100 / LTE	Unapproved use on Annexed territories only. Previously used by Tattelecom
250	57	Matrix Mobile	Matrix Telecom	Operational	MVNO	
250	59	WireFire	NetbyNet	Not operational	MVNO	Data only, defunct in 2022
250	60	Volna mobile	KTK Telecom	Operational	GSM 900 / GSM 1800 / UMTS 2100 / LTE 2600	Unapproved use on Annexed territories only. Works in national roaming outside the unrecognized regions without additional fees.
250	61	Intertelecom	Intertelecom	Not operational	CDMA 800	Unapproved use in Crimea only
250	62	T-Mobile	T-Mobile	Operational	MVNO	Former Tinkoff Mobile
250	91	Sonic Duo	Sonic Duo CJSC	Not operational	GSM 1800	
250	92		Primtelefon	Not operational	Unknown	
250	93		Telecom XXI	Not operational	Unknown	
250	96	+7Telecom	K-Telecom	Operational	GSM 900 / GSM 1800 / UMTS 2100 / LTE 2600	Unapproved use on Annexed territories only. Works in national roaming outside the unrecognized regions without additional fees.
250	97	Phoenix	State Unitary Enterprise of DPR "Republican Telecommunications Operator"	Operational	GSM 900 / GSM 1800 / UMTS 2100 / LTE 800 / LTE 900 / LTE 1800 / LTE 2600	Unapproved use on Annexed territories only. Works in national roaming outside the unrecognized regions.
250	98	MKS (ex. Lugacom)	OOO "MKS"	Operational	GSM 900 / GSM 1800 / UMTS 2100 / LTE 800 / LTE 900 / LTE 1800 / LTE 2600	Unapproved use on Annexed territories only. Works in national roaming outside the unrecognized regions.
250	99	Beeline	OJSC Vimpel-Communications	Operational	GSM 900 / GSM 1800 / UMTS 900 / LTE 800 / LTE 900 / LTE 1800 / LTE 2100 / LTE 2600 / 5G 4500	UMTS 2100 shut down in 2021
250	811		Votek Mobile	Not operational	AMPS / DAMPS / GSM 1800	

=== S ===
==== San Marino – SM ====
The Republic of San Marino is partially served by Italian networks Iliad Italia, Vodafone Italy and Wind Tre and mainly served by TIM who owns a license and has towers inside San Marino, but runs the network as an undifferentiated part of their Italian network.

MCC	MNC	Brand	Operator	Status	Bands (MHz)	References and notes
292	01	PRIMA	San Marino Telecom	Not operational	GSM 900 / GSM 1800 / UMTS 2100	

==== Serbia – RS ====
MCC	MNC	Brand	Operator	Status	Bands (MHz)	References and notes
220	01	Yettel	Yettel Serbia	Operational	GSM 900 / GSM 1800 / UMTS 900 / UMTS 2100 / LTE 800 / LTE 1800	Former Telenor, 063 MOBTEL Srbija GSM, Mobi 63
220	02	One	Telenor Montenegro	Not operational	GSM 900 / GSM 1800 / UMTS 2100	Former Telenor, ProMonte GSM; moved to MCC 297 MNC 01 (Montenegro) on 11 November 2011
220	03	mt:s	Telekom Srbija	Operational	GSM 900 / UMTS 900 / UMTS 2100 / LTE 800 / LTE 1800 / 5G 700 / 5G 3500 / TETRA	
220	04	T-Mobile CG	T-Mobile Montenegro LLC	Not operational	GSM	Former MoNet GSM; moved to MCC 297 MNC 02 (Montenegro)
220	05	A1 SRB	A1 Srbija d.o.o.	Operational	GSM 900 / GSM 1800 / UMTS 2100 / LTE 800 / LTE 1800	Former Vip Mobile
220	07	Orion	Orion Telekom	Not operational	CDMA 450	MNC withdrawn
220	09	Vectone Mobile	MUNDIO MOBILE d.o.o.	Not operational	MVNO	MNC withdrawn
220	11	Globaltel	Telekom Srbija	Not operational	MVNO	MNC withdrawn
220	12	STmobile	Sat-Trakt d.o.o. Bačka Topola	Operational	MVNO	
220	14		Ringtel Mobile d.o.o.	Unknown	Unknown	
220	20	A1 SRB	A1 Srbija d.o.o.	Unknown	Unknown	Former Vip Mobile
220	21		Infrastruktura železnice Srbije a.d.	Unknown	GSM-R	

==== Slovakia – SK ====
MCC	MNC	Brand	Operator	Status	Bands (MHz)	References and notes
231	01	Orange	Orange Slovensko	Operational	GSM 900 / LTE 800 / LTE 1800 / LTE 2600 / 5G 3500	Former Globtel; UMTS shut down Feb 2024
231	02	Telekom	Slovak Telekom	Operational	GSM 900 / LTE 800 / LTE 1800 / LTE 2100 / LTE 2600 / TD-LTE 3700 / 5G 2100	Former Eurotel / T-Mobile; UMTS shut down Nov 2023
231	03	4ka	SWAN Mobile, a.s.	Operational	LTE 1800 / TD-LTE 3500 / TD-LTE 3700 / 5G 3500	
231	04	Telekom	Slovak Telekom	Operational	GSM 900	Former T-Mobile; UMTS shut down Nov 2023
231	05	Orange	Orange Slovensko	Operational	GSM 900	UMTS shut down Feb 2024
231	06	O_{2}	O2 Slovakia	Operational	GSM 900 / LTE 800 / LTE 1800 / TD-LTE 3500 / TD-LTE 3700 / 5G 3500	Former Telefónica O2 Slovakia; UMTS shut down Dec 2025
231	07	Orange	Orange Slovensko	Unknown	Unknown	Former Towercom
231	08	Unimobile	Uniphone, s.r.o.	Testing	MVNO	Former IPfon, s.r.o.
231	09		DSI DATA, a.s.	Unknown	Unknown	
231	10		HMZ RÁDIOKOMUNIKÁCIE, spol. s r.o.	Not operational	Unknown	MNC withdrawn
231	50	Telekom	Slovak Telekom	Unknown	Unknown	
231	51		CETIN Networks, s. r. o.	Operational	Unknown	Former O2 Networks
231	99	ŽSR	Železnice Slovenskej Republiky	Operational	GSM-R	Railway communication and signalling

==== Slovenia – SI ====
MCC	MNC	Brand	Operator	Status	Bands (MHz)	References and notes
293	10		SŽ - Infrastruktura, d.o.o.	Operational	GSM-R	
293	11		BeeIN d.o.o.	Not operational	5G 700	MNC withdrawn
293	20		COMPATEL Ltd	Unknown	Unknown	
293	21		NOVATEL d.o.o.	Unknown	MVNO	
293	22		Mobile One Ltd.	Unknown	MVNO	
293	40	A1 SI	A1 Slovenija	Operational	GSM 900 / GSM 1800 / LTE 800 / LTE 1800 / LTE 2100 / LTE 2600 / 5G 700 / 5G 3500	Former Si.mobil; UMTS shut down Jun 2023
293	41	Mobitel	Telekom Slovenije	Operational	GSM 900 / GSM 1800 / LTE 700 / LTE 800 / LTE 900 / LTE 1800 / LTE 2100 / LTE 2600 / 5G 700 / 5G 2600 / 5G 3600	Used by IPKO network; UMTS shut down Sep 2022
293	64	T-2	T-2 d.o.o.	Operational	UMTS 2100 / LTE 2100 / 5G 2300 / 5G 3500	
293	70	Telemach	Tušmobil d.o.o.	Operational	GSM 900 / GSM 1800 / UMTS 900 / UMTS 2100 / LTE 700 / LTE 800 / LTE 1800 / LTE 2100 / 5G 700 / 5G 3500	
293	86		ELEKTRO GORENJSKA, d.d	Unknown	LTE 700	

==== Spain – ES ====
MCC	MNC	Brand	Operator	Status	Bands (MHz)	References and notes
214	01	Vodafone	Vodafone Spain	Operational	GSM 900 / LTE 800 / LTE 1800 / LTE 2100 / LTE 2600 / TD-LTE 2600 / 5G 700 / 5G 3500	UMTS shut down Oct 2024
214	02	Cube Móvil	Olamo Mobile S.L.U.	Operational	MVNO	Former Alta Tecnologia en Comunicacions, Fibracat
214	03	Orange	Orange Espagne S.A.U	Operational	GSM 900 / GSM 1800 / UMTS 900 / UMTS 2100 / LTE 800 / LTE 1800 / LTE 2100 / LTE 2600 / 5G 700 / 5G 3500	Also use MNC 33; Some MVNO use this MNC (Hualong, The Phone House Spain, CABLE movil, SUOP)
214	04	Yoigo	Grupo MÁSMÓVIL	Operational	MVNO	LTE / 5G shut down Aug 2025
214	05	Movistar	Telefónica Móviles España	Operational	MVNO	Used by resellers
214	06	Vodafone	Vodafone Spain	Operational	MVNO	Used by resellers (e.g. Lowi - Vodafone's own low cost virtual operator, Lebara, Hits)
214	07	Movistar	Telefónica Móviles España	Operational	GSM 900 / UMTS 900 / UMTS 2100 / LTE 800 / LTE 1800 / LTE 2100 / LTE 2600 / 5G 700 / 5G 1800 / 5G 2100 / 5G 3500 / 5G 26000	Used by Movistar and O₂ Spain - Movistar's own low cost virtual operator; UMTS to shut down 2025
214	08	Euskaltel	Euskaltel, S.A.	Operational	MVNO	Acquired by Grupo MÁSMÓVIL; Some MVNO use this MNC (RACC)
214	09	Orange	Orange Espagne S.A.U	Operational	MVNO	Used by resellers
214	10		ZINNIA TELECOMUNICACIONES, S.L.U.	Unknown	Unknown	Former Operadora de Telecomunicaciones Opera SL
214	11		TELECOM CASTILLA-LA MANCHA, S.A.	Unknown	Unknown	Former Orange (Orange Espagne S.A.U)
214	12		CHADEVA SUR 2001, S.L.U.	Unknown	Unknown	Former Contacta Servicios Avanzados de Telecomunicaciones SL, SAC CONVERGENT AGGREGATION SERVICES, VENUS MOVIL
214	13		FOOTBALLERISTA MOBILE SPAIN, S.A.	Unknown	MVNO	Former Incotel Ingeniera y Consultaria, SYMA MOBILE ESPAÑA
214	14		AVATEL MÓVIL, S.L.U.	Operational	WiMAX	Former Incotel Servicioz Avanzados SL
214	15		PROCONO, S.A.	Unknown	Unknown	Former BT Group
214	16	TeleCable	R Cable y Telecomunicaciones Galicia S.A.	Operational	MVNO	Acquired by Euskaltel
214	17	Móbil R	R Cable y Telecomunicaciones Galicia S.A.	Operational	MVNO / 5G	Acquired by Euskaltel; 5G for fixed wireless
214	18	ONO	Vodafone Spain	Not operational	MVNO	MNC withdrawn; acquired by Vodafone
214	19	Simyo	Orange España Virtual Sl.	Operational	MVNO	Acquired by Orange
214	20	Fonyou	Fonyou Telecom S.L.	Not operational	MVNO	MNC withdrawn
214	21	Jazztel	Orange Espagne S.A.U.	Not operational	MVNO	Acquired by Orange in 2014; MNC withdrawn
214	22	DIGI mobil	Best Spain Telecom	Operational	MVNO	
214	23		Xfera Moviles S.A.U.	Unknown	Unknown	
214	24		VODAFONE ESPAÑA, S.A.U.	Operational	MVNO	Former Eroski Móvil España, acquired by Vodafone in Feb 2018; some MVNOs use this MNC (Orbitel, Vizzavi)
214	25		Xfera Moviles S.A.U.	Not operational	Unknown	Former Lycamobile; MNC withdrawn
214	26		Lleida Networks Serveis Telemátics, SL	Unknown	Unknown	
214	27	Truphone	SCN Truphone, S.L.	Operational	MVNO	
214	28	Murcia4G	Consorcio de Telecomunicaciones Avanzadas, S.A.	Not operational	TD-LTE 2600	LTE band 38; MNC withdrawn
214	29		Xfera Moviles S.A.U.	Not operational	TD-LTE 3500	Former NEO-SKY 2002; MNC withdrawn
214	30		Compatel Limited	Not operational	Unknown	MNC withdrawn
214	31		Red Digital De Telecomunicaciones de las Islas Baleares, S.L.	Unknown	Unknown	
214	32	Tuenti	Telefónica Móviles España	Not operational	MVNO	MNC withdrawn, replaced by MNC 05
214	33		Xfera Móviles, S.A.U.	Not operational	WiMAX	Former Eurona Wireless Telecom; MNC withdrawn
214	34		Aire Networks del Mediterráneo, S.L.U.	Operational	LTE 2600	
214	35		INGENIUM OUTSOURCING SERVICES, S.L.	Unknown	MVNO	
214	36		ALAI OPERADOR DE TELECOMUNICACIONES, S.L	Unknown	MVNO	Former OPEN CABLE TELECOMUNICACIONES, S.L.
214	37		Vodafone Spain	Unknown	Unknown	
214	38		Telefónica Móviles España, S.A.U.	Unknown	Unknown	
214	51	ADIF	Administrador de Infraestructuras Ferroviarias	Operational	GSM-R	
214	700		Iberdrola	Unknown	Unknown	
214	701		Endesa	Unknown	Unknown	
214	702		Universidad de Málaga	Unknown	Unknown	
214	703		ENDESA GENERACIÓN, S.A.	Unknown	Unknown	
214	704	Orange	Orange Espagne S.A.U.	Unknown	Unknown	Former Amper Sistemas
214	705		Administrador de Infraestructuras Ferroviarias	Unknown	Unknown	
214	706		Gobierno Vasco	Unknown	Unknown	
214	707		Centro de Sistemas y Tecnologías de la Información y las Comunicaciones	Unknown	Unknown	
214	709	CTTI	Centre de Telecomunicacions i Tecnologies de la Informació de la Generalitat de Catalunya	Unknown	Unknown	
214	710		Autoridad Portuaria de Valencia	Unknown	Unknown	

==== Sweden – SE ====
MCC	MNC	Brand	Operator	Status	Bands (MHz)	References and notes
240	01	Telia	Telia Sverige AB	Operational	GSM 900 / GSM 1800 / LTE 800 / LTE 1800 / LTE 2600 / 5G 700	UMTS shut down Dec 2025
240	02	3	HI3G Access AB	Operational	LTE 800 / LTE 2600 / TD-LTE 2600 / TD-5G 2600	UMTS shut down Dec 2025
240	03	Net 1	Teracom AB	Operational	LTE 450	Former Nordisk Mobiltelefon, Ice.net; CDMA 450 shut down
240	04	SWEDEN	3G Infrastructure Services AB	Not operational	UMTS 2100	Owned by Hi3G Access (3) and Telenor. MNC withdrawn
240	05	Sweden 3G	Svenska UMTS-Nät AB	Not operational	UMTS 2100	Owned by Telia and Tele2. MNC withdrawn
240	06	Telenor	Telenor Sverige AB	Not operational	UMTS 2100	Former Vodafone Sweden; Shut down Dec 2025
240	07	Tele2	Tele2 Sverige AB	Operational	LTE 800 / LTE 900 / LTE 1800 / LTE 2600	MOCN r6 network; UMTS shut down Dec 2025
240	08	Telenor	Telenor Sverige AB	Not operational	GSM 900 / GSM 1800	Merged with Tele2 into Net4Mobility
240	09	Com4	Communication for Devices in Sweden AB	Unknown	Unknown	Former djuice (Telenor MVNO)
240	10	Spring Mobil	Tele2 Sverige AB	Operational		Only used on femto- and nanocells
240	11	GlobalCell	GlobalCell EU Ltd.	Operational	MVNO	Former Lindholmen Science Park, ComHem AB
240	12	Lycamobile	Lycamobile Sweden Limited	Operational	MVNO	
240	13		Bredband2 Allmänna IT AB	Unknown	Unknown	Former Alltele Företag Sverige AB, A3 Företag AB, Bredband2 Företag AB
240	14		Tele2 Sverige AB	Unknown	Unknown	Former TDC Sverige AB (MVNO)
240	15		Sierra Wireless Sweden AB	Unknown	Unknown	Former Wireless Maingate Nordic AB
240	16		42 Telecom AB	Operational	GSM	
240	17	Gotanet	Götalandsnätet AB	Operational	MVNO	
240	18		Generic Mobile Systems Sweden AB	Unknown	Unknown	
240	19		Hi3G Access AB	Unknown	Unknown	Former Vectone / Mundio
240	20		Sierra Wireless Sweden AB	Operational	MVNO	Former Wireless Maingate Messaging Services AB
240	21	MobiSir	Trafikverket ICT	Operational	GSM-R 900	
240	22		Mediafon Carrier Services UAB	Unknown	Unknown	Former EuTel AB
240	23		Infobip Limited (UK)	Not operational	Unknown	
240	24	Sweden 2G	Net4Mobility HB	Operational	LTE 800 / LTE 900 / LTE 1800 / LTE 2600 / 5G 700 / 5G 3500	LTE1800 only available in major cities; owned by Telenor and Tele2; GSM shut down Dec 2025
240	25		Monty UK Global Ltd	Unknown	Unknown	Former Digitel Mobile Srl
240	26		Twilio Sweden AB	Unknown	Unknown	Former Beepsend AB
240	27		GlobeTouch AB	Operational	MVNO	Former Fogg Mobile AB; M2M services only
240	28		LINK Mobile A/S	Not operational	Unknown	Former CoolTEL Aps; MNC withdrawn
240	29		Mercury International Carrier Services AB	Unknown	Unknown	
240	30		Teracom AB	Unknown	Unknown	Former NextGen Mobile Ltd.
240	31		RebTel Network AB	Not operational	Unknown	Former Mobimax AB; MNC withdrawn
240	32		Compatel Limited	Unknown	Unknown	
240	33		Mobile Arts AB	Unknown	Unknown	
240	34		Trafikverket centralfunktion IT	Unknown	Unknown	Formerly Tigo, Pro Net;
240	35		42 Telecom LTD	Unknown	Unknown	
240	36		interactive digital media GmbH	Unknown	Unknown	
240	37		Sinch Sweden AB	Unknown	Unknown	Former CLX Networks AB
240	38	Voxbone	Voxbone mobile	Operational	MVNO	
240	39		Primlight AB	Not operational	Unknown	Former iCentrex Sweden AB, Borderlight AB; MNC withdrawn
240	40		Netmore Group AB	Unknown	Unknown	Former ReWiCom Scandinavia AB, North net connect AB
240	41		Telenor Sverige AB	Unknown	Unknown	Former Shyam Telecom UK
240	42	Telenor IoT	Telenor Connexion AB	Unknown	Unknown	
240	43		MobiWeb Ltd.	Unknown	Unknown	
240	44		Telenabler AB	Unknown	Unknown	Former Limitless Mobile AB
240	45		Spirius AB	Unknown	Unknown	
240	46	Viahub	SMS Provider Corp.	Unknown	MVNO	
240	47		Viatel Sweden AB	Unknown	Unknown	
240	48		Tismi BV	Unknown	MVNO	
240	49		Telia Sverige AB	Unknown	Unknown	
240	50		eRate Sverige AB	Unknown	Unknown	Former Telavox AB
240	51		YATECO OÜ	Unknown	Unknown	
240	58		Telia Sverige AB	Unknown	Unknown	
240	59	Rakel G2	Swedish Civil Defence and Resilience Agency	Unknown	5G 700	
240	60		Västra Götalandsregionen	Unknown	Unknown	Temporary assigned until 31 December 2026; former Telefonaktiebolaget LM Ericsson
240	61		MessageBird B.V.	Not operational	Unknown	temporary license until 3 November 2019
240	63	FTS	Fink Telecom Services	Not operational	Unknown	MNC withdrawn
240	900		Västra Götalandsregionen	Unknown	Unknown	Private network

==== Switzerland – CH ====
MCC	MNC	Brand	Operator	Status	Bands (MHz)	References and notes
228	01	Swisscom	Swisscom AG	Operational	LTE 700 / LTE 800 / LTE 900 / LTE 1500 / LTE 1800 / LTE 2100 / LTE 2600 / 5G 700 / 5G 2100 / 5G 3500	GSM shut down Apr 2021, UMTS Apr 2026
228	02	Sunrise	Sunrise UPC	Operational	LTE 800 / LTE 900 / LTE 1800 / LTE 2100 / LTE 2600 / 5G 700 / 5G 3500	GSM shut down Jan 2023, UMTS shut down Aug 2025
228	03	Salt	Salt Mobile SA	Operational	UMTS 900 / UMTS 2100 / LTE 800 / LTE 1800 / LTE 2100 / LTE 2600 / 5G 700 / 5G 3500	Former Orange; GSM shut down June 2020
228	05		Comfone AG	Not operational	Unknown	Former Togewanet AG
228	06	SBB-CFF-FFS	SBB AG	Operational	GSM-R 900	railways communication
228	07	IN&Phone	IN&Phone SA	Not operational	GSM 1800	MNC withdrawn, bankrupt in 2012
228	08	Tele4u	Sunrise Communications AG	Not operational	GSM 1800	Former Tele2; GSM shut down Jan 2023
228	09		Comfone AG	Unknown	Unknown	
228	10		Stadt Polizei Zürich	Not operational	Unknown	MNC withdrawn
228	11		Swisscom Broadcast AG	Unknown	Unknown	
228	12	Sunrise	Sunrise Communications AG	Not operational		
228	13	SBB-CFF-FFS	SBB AG	Not operational	FRMCS 900 / 1900	future railways communication
228	50		3G Mobile AG	Not operational	UMTS 2100	MNC withdrawn
228	51		relario AG	Operational	MVNO	Former BebbiCell AG
228	52	Barablu	Barablu	Not operational		MNC withdrawn
228	53	upc cablecom	Sunrise UPC GmbH	Operational	MVNO	
228	54	Lycamobile	Lycamobile AG	Operational	MVNO	
228	55		Komodos SA	Not operational		Former WeMobile; SMS relay only
228	56		SMSRelay AG	Not operational	Unknown	MNC withdrawn
228	57		Mitto AG	Unknown		SMS relay only
228	58	beeone	Beeone Communications SA	Operational	MVNO	
228	59	Vectone	Mundio Mobile Limited	Not operational	MVNO	MNC withdrawn
228	60	Sunrise	Sunrise Communications AG	Unknown	Unknown	Former network sharing test with Salt Mobile
228	61		Compatel Ltd.	Not operational		SMS relay only; MNC withdrawn
228	62		Telecom26 AG	Operational	MVNO	
228	63	FTS	Fink Telecom Services	Not operational	Unknown	SMS relay only; MNC withdrawn
228	64		Nth AG	Operational	MVNO	Mobile payment solutions
228	65		Nexphone AG	Operational	MVNO	
228	66		Inovia Services SA	Not operational	Unknown	MNC withdrawn
228	67		Datatrade Managed AG	Unknown	Unknown	
228	68		Intellico AG	Unknown	Unknown	
228	69		MTEL Schweiz GmbH	Unknown	MVNO	
228	70		Tismi BV	Unknown	Unknown	
228	71	spusu	MASS Response Service GmbH	Unknown	MVNO	
228	72	SolNet	BSE Software GmbH	Unknown	Unknown	
228	73	iWay	iWay AG	Operational	MVNO	
228	74	net+	netplus.ch SA	Operational	MVNO	
228	75		Telecom Liechtenstein AG	Unknown	Unknown	
228	76		1GLOBAL Operations (Switzerland) GmbH	Unknown	Unknown	
228	80		Phonegroup SA	Unknown	Unknown	
228	98		Etablissement Cantonal d'Assurance	Unknown	Unknown	Pilot project
228	99		Swisscom Broadcast AG	Not operational		Test network; MNC withdrawn

=== T ===
==== Turkey – TR ====
MCC	MNC	Brand	Operator	Status	Bands (MHz)	References and notes
286	01	Turkcell	Turkcell Iletisim Hizmetleri A.S.	Operational	GSM 900 / UMTS 900 / UMTS 2100 / LTE 800 / LTE 1800 / LTE 2100 / LTE 2600 / 5G 700 / 5G 3500	
286	02	Vodafone	Vodafone Turkey	Operational	GSM 900 / UMTS 2100 / LTE 800 / LTE 900 / LTE 1800 / LTE 2100 / LTE 2600 / TD-LTE 2600 / 5G 700 / 5G 3500	Formerly known as Telsim
286	03	Türk Telekom	Türk Telekom	Operational	GSM 1800 / UMTS 2100 / LTE 800 / LTE 900 / LTE 1800 / LTE 2600 / TD-LTE 2600 / 5G 700 / 5G 3500	Former Aria, merged with Aycell to form Avea
286	04	Aycell	Aycell	Not operational	GSM 1800	Merged into Aria to form Avea

=== U ===
==== Ukraine – UA ====
MCC	MNC	Brand	Operator	Status	Bands (MHz)	References and notes
255	01	Vodafone	PRJSC “VF Ukraine"	Operational	GSM 900 / GSM 1800 / UMTS 2100 / LTE 900 / LTE 1800 / LTE 2600 / TD-LTE 2600 / 5G 3500	Former UMC, MTS; CDMA 450 shut down June 2018
255	02	Kyivstar	PRJSC “Kyivstar"	Not operational	GSM 900 / GSM 1800 / UMTS 2100	Former Beeline, WellCOM, URS; taken over by Kyivstar
255	03	Kyivstar	PRJSC “Kyivstar"	Operational	GSM 900 / GSM 1800 / LTE 900 / LTE 1800 / LTE 2100 / TD-LTE 2300 / LTE 2600 / 5G 3500	UMTS shut down Sep 2026
255	04	Intertelecom	International Telecommunications	Operational	MVNO	CDMA shut down 2021
255	05	Kyivstar	PRJSC “Kyivstar"	Not operational	GSM 1800	Former Golden Telecom; taken over by Kyivstar; MNC withdrawn
255	06	lifecell	lifecell LLC	Operational	GSM 900 / GSM 1800 / UMTS 2100 / LTE 900 / LTE 1800 / LTE 2100 / LTE 2600 / 5G 3500	Former life:) / Astelit
255	07	3Mob; Lycamobile	Trimob LLC	Operational	UMTS 2100	Former Utel, GSM / UMTS roaming with Vodafone
255	08		JSC Ukrtelecom	Unknown	Unknown	
255	09		PRJSC "Farlep-Invest"	Unknown	Unknown	part of Vega Telecommunications Group
255	10		Atlantis Telecom LLC	Unknown	Unknown	
255	11		T.R. Communications LLC	Unknown	Unknown	
255	21	PEOPLEnet	PRJSC “Telesystems of Ukraine"	Not operational	CDMA 800	Shut down Jan 2025
255	23	CDMA Ukraine	Intertelecom LLC	Not operational	CDMA 800	Taken over by Intertelecom; MNC withdrawn
255	25	NEWTONE	PRJSC “Telesystems of Ukraine"	Not operational	CDMA 800	Taken over by PEOPLEnet; MNC withdrawn
255	701		Ukrainian Special Systems	Unknown	Unknown	
255	702		Limited Liability Company "J&W"	Unknown	Unknown	
255	707	Kyivstar	PRJSC “Kyivstar"	Unknown	Unknown	
255	99	Phoenix; MKS (ex. Lugacom)	State Unitary Enterprise of DPR "Republican Telecommunications Operator"; OOO "MKS"	Not operational	GSM 900 / GSM 1800 / UMTS 2100 / LTE 800 / LTE 900 / LTE 1800 / LTE 2600	"Donetsk People's Republic" and "Luhansk People's Republic" only; MNC not officially assigned. Moved to Russia's MCC shortly after the annexation of Donetsk, Luhansk, Kherson and Zaporizhzhia oblasts.

==== United Kingdom – GB ====
MCC	MNC	Brand	Operator	Status	Bands (MHz)	References and notes
234	00	BT	BT Group	Operational	GSM 900 / GSM 1800 / UMTS 2100	
234	01	Vectone Mobile	Mundio Mobile Limited	Operational	MVNO	Previously Mapesbury Communications Ltd.; uses EE network
234	02	O2 (UK)	Telefónica Europe	Operational	LTE 1800	Used for satellite Direct to Cell on Band 3.
234	03	Airtel-Vodafone	Jersey Airtel Ltd	Operational	GSM 900 / GSM 1800 / UMTS 2100 / LTE 800 / LTE 1800 / LTE 2600	Guernsey, Jersey
234	04		Wave Mobile Ltd	Unknown	Unknown	Former FMS Solutions
234	05		Spitfire Network Services Limited	Unknown	Unknown	Former COLT Mobile Telecommunications Ltd.
234	06		Internet Computer Bureau Limited	Not operational		MNC withdrawn
234	07	Vodafone UK	Vodafone	Not operational	GSM 1800	Former Cable & Wireless Worldwide; MNC withdrawn
234	08	BT OnePhone	BT OnePhone (UK) Ltd	Operational	MVNO	Uses the EE Network
234	09		Tismi BV	Unknown		
234	10	O2 (UK)	Telefónica Europe	Operational	GSM 900 / LTE 800 / LTE 900 / LTE 1800 / LTE 2100 / TD-LTE 2300 / 5G 700 / 5G 900 / TD-5G 2600 / 5G 3500	UMTS shut down Feb 2026
234	11	O2 (UK)	Telefónica Europe	Operational	GSM 900 / LTE 800 / LTE 900 / LTE 1800 / LTE 2100 / TD-LTE 2300 / 5G 700 / 5G 900 / TD-5G 2600 / 5G 3500	
234	12	Railtrack	Network Rail Infrastructure Ltd	Operational	GSM-R	
234	13	Railtrack	Network Rail Infrastructure Ltd	Operational	GSM-R	
234	14		HSL Messaging Limited	Operational	GSM 1800	Former Hay Systems, Link Mobility
234	15	Vodafone UK	Vodafone	Operational	GSM 900 / GSM 1800 / LTE 800 / LTE 900 / LTE 1800 / LTE 2100 / LTE 2600 / TD-LTE 2600 / 5G 900 / 5G 2100 / 5G 3500	UMTS shut down Feb 2024
234	16	Talk Talk	TalkTalk Communications Limited	Operational	MVNO	Formerly Opal Tel Ltd; uses Vodafone network
234	17		FleXtel Limited	Not operational		MNC withdrawn
234	18	Cloud9	Wireless Logic Limited	Operational	MVNO	Isle of Man network shut down
234	19	PMN	Teleware plc	Operational	GSM 1800	Private GSM; roaming with Vodafone
234	20	3	Three UK	Operational	LTE 800 / LTE 1500 / LTE 1800 / LTE 2100 / 5G 700 / 5G 2100 / 5G 3500	National roaming with Orange (UK)'s 2G network; UMTS shut down Nov 2025
234	21		LogicStar Ltd	Not operational	Unknown	MNC withdrawn
234	22		Telesign Mobile Limited	Unknown	Unknown	Former Routo Telecommunications Limited
234	23		Icron Network Limited	Unknown	Unknown	
234	24	Greenfone	Stour Marine Limited	Operational	MVNO	Uses Stour Marine network
234	25	Truphone	Truphone	Operational	MVNO	Uses Vodafone network
234	26	Lycamobile	Lycamobile UK Limited	Operational	MVNO	
234	27	Teleena	Tata Communications Move UK Ltd	Operational	MVNO	
234	28		Marathon Telecom Limited	Operational	MVNO	Holds unused spectrum in Jersey
234	29	aql	(aq) Limited	Unknown	Unknown	
234	30	EE	EE Limited	Operational	GSM 1800 / LTE 800 / LTE 1800 / LTE 2100 / LTE 2600 / 5G 700 / 5G 1800 / 5G 2100 / 5G 2600 / 5G 3500	Previously owned by Deutsche Telekom; used by MVNOs Asda Mobile & Virgin Mobile; UMTS shut down Feb 2024
234	31	EE	EE Limited	Allocated	GSM 1800 / LTE 800 / LTE 1800 / LTE 2100 / LTE 2600 / 5G 700 / 5G 1800 / 5G 2100 / 5G 2600 / 5G 3500	
234	32	EE	EE Limited	Allocated	GSM 1800 / LTE 800 / LTE 1800 / LTE 2100 / LTE 2600 / 5G 700 / 5G 1800 / 5G 2100 / 5G 2600 / 5G 3500	
234	33	EE	EE Limited	Operational	GSM 1800 / LTE 800 / LTE 1800 / LTE 2100 / LTE 2600 / 5G 700 / 5G 1800 / 5G 2100 / 5G 2600 / 5G 3500	Previously owned by Orange S.A.
234	34	EE	EE Limited	Operational	GSM 1800 / LTE 800 / LTE 1800 / LTE 2100 / LTE 2600 / 5G 700 / 5G 1800 / 5G 2100 / 5G 2600 / 5G 3500	Previously owned by Orange S.A.
234	35		JSC Ingenium (UK) Limited	Not operational	Unknown	MNC withdrawn
234	36	Sure Mobile	Sure Isle of Man Ltd.	Operational	GSM 900 / UMTS 900 / UMTS 2100 / LTE 800 / LTE 1800 / LTE 2100	Isle of Man; former Cable & Wireless
234	37		Synectiv Ltd	Unknown	Unknown	
234	38	Virgin Mobile	Virgin Media	Unknown	Unknown	
234	39		Gamma Telecom Holdings Ltd.	Unknown	Unknown	Former SSE Energy Supply Limited
234	40	spusu	MASS Response Service GmbH	Operational	MVNO	
234	50	JT	JT Group Limited	Operational	GSM 900 / GSM 1800 / UMTS 900 / UMTS 2100 / LTE 800 / LTE 1800 / LTE 2600	Guernsey, Jersey; former Wave Telecom
234	51	Relish	UK Broadband Limited	Operational	TD-LTE 3500 / TD-LTE 3700	
234	52		Shyam Telecom UK Ltd	Unknown	Unknown	
234	53	Tango Extend	Tango Networks UK Ltd	Operational	MVNO	Former Limitless Mobile
234	54	iD Mobile	The Carphone Warehouse Limited	Operational	MVNO	Uses Three UK
234	55	Sure Mobile	Sure (Guernsey) Limited	Operational	GSM 900 / GSM 1800 / UMTS 900 / UMTS 2100 / LTE 800 / LTE 1800 / LTE 2600	Guernsey, Jersey; former Cable & Wireless
234	56		National Cyber Security Centre	Unknown	Unknown	Former CESG
234	57	Sky Mobile	Sky UK Limited	Operational	MVNO	Uses the O2 UK network
234	58	Pronto GSM	Manx Telecom	Operational	GSM 900 / UMTS 2100 / LTE 800 / LTE 1800	Isle of Man
234	59		Limitless Mobile Ltd	Not operational	MVNO	MNC withdrawn
234	70		AMSUK Ltd.	Not operational	Unknown	MNC withdrawn
234	71		Home Office	Unknown	Unknown	
234	72	Hanhaa Mobile	Hanhaa Limited	Operational	MVNO	M2M applications
234	73		Bluewave Communications Ltd	Operational	TD-LTE 3500	Isle of Man
234	74		Circles MVNE International B.V.	Unknown	MVNO	Former Pareteum Europe
234	75		MASS Response Service GmbH	Not operational	Unknown	MNC withdrawn
234	76	BT	BT Group	Operational	GSM 900 / GSM 1800	
234	77	Vodafone UK	Vodafone United Kingdom	Unknown	Unknown	
234	78	Airwave	Airwave Solutions Ltd	Operational	TETRA	
234	79	UKTL	UK Telecoms Lab	Unknown	Unknown	
234	81		National Grid Telecoms Limited	Unknown	Unknown	
234	82		GeoNetworks	Unknown	5G	Rural networks
234	83	UKTL	UK Telecoms Lab	Unknown	Unknown	
234	84		National Grid Telecoms Limited	Unknown	Unknown	
234	86		EE Limited	Unknown	Unknown	
234	87		Lebara	Operational	MVNO	
234	88	telet	Telet Research (N.I.) Limited	Operational	GSM 1800/LTE 1800/ LTE 2600/ 5G 2600/ 5G 3800	
=== United Kingdom - GB - 235 === 235	00	Vectone Mobile	Mundio Mobile Limited	Unknown		
235	01	EE	EE Limited	Unknown	Unknown	
235	02	EE	EE Limited	Unknown	Unknown	
235	03	Relish	UK Broadband Limited	Unknown	Unknown	
235	04		University of Strathclyde	Unknown	5G	for more info, see StrathSDR
235	06		University of Strathclyde	Unknown	5G	for more info, see StrathSDR
235	07		University of Strathclyde	Unknown	5G	for more info, see StrathSDR
235	08		Spitfire Network Services Limited	Not operational	Unknown	MNC withdrawn
235	77	BT	BT Group	Unknown		
235	88	telet	Telet Research (N.I.) Limited	Operational	LTE / 5G	
235	91	Vodafone UK	Vodafone United Kingdom	Unknown		Spitfire Network Services Limited
235	92	Vodafone UK	Vodafone United Kingdom	Not operational		Former Cable & Wireless UK; MNC withdrawn
235	94		Hutchison 3G UK Ltd	Unknown		
235	95		Network Rail Infrastructure Limited	Test Network	GSM-R	

== See also ==
- List of mobile network operators of Europe
- List of LTE networks in Europe
