= Bandwidth Inc. =

American communications provider

- Type: Public
- Traded as: Nasdaq: BAND; Russell 2000 Index company
- Founded: 1999; 27 years ago
- Headquarters: Raleigh, North Carolina, US,
- Key people: David Morken (CEO)
- Products: Telecommunications; Voice; SMS; MMS; SIP Trunking; 911 Access; Phone Numbers
- Number of employees: 700+
- Website: www.bandwidth.com

Bandwidth Inc. is an American communications platform as a service (CPaas) company that provides application programming interfaces (APIs) for voice calling, text messaging, and emergency services. The company operates its own global IP voice network and provides communications infrastructure for businesses and software applications.

Founded in 1999 by David Morken and headquartered in Raleigh, North Carolina, Bandwith became a publicly traded company on the Nasdaq stock exchange in 2017.

== History ==
Bandwidth was formed in 1999 by David Morken who was later joined by Henry Kaestner as co-founder in 2001, merging Bandwidth International into Bandwidth.com.

In Aug. 2023, Bandwidth moved to a new, purpose-built 40-acre headquarters campus at 2230 Bandmate Way in Raleigh, where the company maintains a workforce of about 1,000 employees as of Aug. 2023.

On November 10, 2017, the company had an initial public offering on the Nasdq which raised $80 million in capital by selling 4 million $20 shares.

On January 11, 2024, Bandwidth terminated its incentive agreement with the state of North Carolina, which required creating over 1,100 local jobs, citing the need for more hiring flexibility outside of Raleigh.

Bandwidth has been noted for its unusual approach of incorporating Christian religion in business, including starting meetings with Christian prayers.

== Acquisitions ==
On October 12, 2020, Bandwidth announced it had signed a definitive agreement to acquire Voxbone for an enterprise value of €446 million EUR.

== Partnership ==
In August 2020, Bandwidth announced it had partnered with NC State University for a study that which ran from February 2019 to January 2020 to study fraudulent traffic patterns associated with robocalling.

== See also ==
- Unified communications
- Voxbone
