= Intertelecom =

Telecommunications company in Ukraine

- Company type: Private limited company
- Industry: Mobile Telecommunications
- Founded: 1998
- Headquarters: Odesa, Ukraine
- Products: Mobile phone services Internet telephony 2G: GSM, MVNO (after 2024), cdmaOne (before 2025); 3G: CDMA2000 1xEV-DO (before 2025)
- Parent: Interdnestrcom
- Website: intertelecom.ua

Intertelecom (Ukrainian: Інтертелеком) is a telecommunications company in Ukraine that operates as mobile virtual network operator (MVNO) and provides internet telephony. Previously it was the largest CDMA mobile operator in Ukraine, providing voice and data services based on a CDMA2000 technologies in the 800 MHz frequency band.

By 2012 Intertelecom subscriber base reached 1 million active users.

Intertelecom uses local network codes for dialing prefixes as well as the national code +38094.

== Mobile internet ==
By mid-2010 Intertelecom launched CDMA2000 1xEV-DO Rev A network in 24 regions of Ukraine and by 2011 upgraded the network to Rev B. By 2013 Rev B covered more than 71% of the population. On May 22, 2019, it was announced that most tariff plans would change their tariff terms starting June 1, 2019, which will lead to a reduction in the amount of minutes for calls and internet traffic. Internet tariffs with a speed limit will have a speed limit of 64 kilobits per second after the daily Internet traffic is exhausted, instead of 128 kilobits. Unlimited Internet tariff plans (except for the Unlimited Internet tariff plan) will have a daily limit on Internet traffic at the maximum speed.

== Coverage ==
By the year 2012, Intertelecom acquired all existing IS-95 and CDMA2000 1xRTT carriers in Ukraine (except PEOPLEnet) such as its rival CDMA UA, thus expanding its coverage area to the entire Ukrainian territory.

On July 1, 2021, voice service coverage in the majority of regions (except for Odesa and Odesa region) got cancelled

In late 2024 operator started migration of CDMA subscribers into GSM network as MVNO.

On January 1, 2025 remaining CDMA2000 network was shut down.
