= Globalcell Mobile =

Globalcell Mobile

Globalcell Mobile a mobile virtual network operator was based in the UK and was established in late 2008

The service offered customers a SIM-only pre-paid service with all customer interaction conducted in the customers' native language, which includes Polish, Russian, Lithuanian, Slovak and English.

Their customer base were predominantly Poles, Lithuanians, Russians and Slovaks living in the UK but also cater for the UK’s immigrant and ethnic population that are looking to call internationally.[1]

Globalcell mobile offered an alternative to calling cards, dual SIM cards and access numbers.[2] The pre-paid SIM not only offered competitive rates to call internationally and low cost rates within the UK for Pay as you go customers not wanting to be tied down by a mobile phone contract.[3]

They are able to do this due to buying capacity in bulk from a much larger UK network.

GloballCell (UK) ceased trading as of 28 November 2010

== History ==
Globalcell Mobile was launched in 2008 with the aim of offering affordable mobile services. The service was built on top of an existing UK network infrastructure (likely through a wholesale agreement with a major carrier, such as Vodafone or Orange).

The company attracted customers by offering customer support and competitive international call rates.

Globalcell ceased operations on 28 November 2010.

== Services ==
High-speed mobile internet in over 100 countries

International voice calls at low rates

Global SMS services

Prepaid data packages with flexible top-up options

Multilingual customer support, including Georgian and English

Fast and secure online top-up via the official website

== Target Market ==
The brand was particularly popular among the Georgian, English and Russian-speaking communities. Marketing materials and the website were available in Georgian, English, and Russian.
