= Ice Norge =

Norwegian telecommunications company

Ice
- Company type: Subsidiary
- Industry: Telecommunications
- Founded: 2003
- Headquarters: Oslo, Norway
- Key people: Shiraz Abid (CEO)
- Products: Mobile telephony, broadband, data services
- Parent: Lyse AS
- Website: www.ice.no

Ice (stylised as ice) is a Norwegian telecommunications company that provides mobile and broadband services. The company is a subsidiary of Lyse AS and is headquartered in Oslo, Norway. It has become the third-largest mobile operator in Norway, competing with Telenor and Telia.

== History ==
Ice was founded in 2003 as a provider of broadband services. The company expanded its services to include mobile telephony and launched its own mobile network in 2015, covering a significant portion of the Norwegian population.

In 2022, Ice became part of the Lyse AS group, a major Norwegian energy and telecom company wholly owned by 14 municipalities in Sør-Rogaland. As of 2024, Ice operates under Lyse Tele AS, alongside other brands like Altibox and Signal.

== Services ==
Ice offers a range of telecommunications services including mobile telephony, broadband, and data services. The company is particularly noted for its mobile services, which include various subscription options catering to different customer needs, from basic to unlimited data plans.

== Network ==
Ice operates its own mobile network, which it has been expanding rapidly since its launch. The network uses a combination of its own infrastructure and roaming agreements with other providers to ensure nationwide coverage. The company also invests heavily in 4G and 5G technologies to improve service quality and expand its customer base.

== Ownership ==
Ice is now part of Lyse Tele AS, a division of Lyse AS. Lyse is a significant player in the Norwegian telecom market, with substantial investments in modern and nationwide digital infrastructure. The group focuses on providing enhanced mobile and broadband services across Norway.
