= Mobyland =

Polish mobile phone network operator

- Type: Private limited company
- Industry: Telecommunications
- Founded: 2006
- Successor: Aero 2
- Headquarters: Warsaw, Poland
- Area served: Poland
- Key people: Andrzej Chajec (Board President); Adam Kuriański (Board Member)
- Services: Telecommunications
- Website: Mobyland.com

Mobyland is a Polish mobile phone network operator. Company objective is to develop a wireless telecommunications network based on the newest fourth generation technologies (3GPP Long Term Evolution). The construction of an independent network is possible thanks to radio frequency reservations held by company. In November 2007 company won a tender organized by the President of the Polish Electronic Communications Office and obtained frequency reservations in the 1800 MHz band Since July 2009 Mobyland is owned by Aero2 Sp. z o.o. At the end of August 2009 the company launched its commercial services.

On September 7, 2010, Mobyland in cooperation with CenterNet have announced that they have launched a first commercial LTE network using 20 MHz of spectrum on the 1800 MHz band.

On November 16, Mobyland showed first commercial LTE modem 1800 MHz working in network being built by company. The modem currently operates in the 10 MHz band and is software upgradeable to operate in the 20 MHz band as well, and allows for download speeds of up to 73 Mbit/s and uploads of 25 Mbit/s.
