= Voxbone =

Belgian communications company

- Type: Public
- Industry: Cloud communications
- Founded: 2005
- Founder: Rodrigue Ullens, Co-Founder; François Strumann, Co-Founder
- Headquarters: Brussels, Belgium
- Key people: David Morken, CEO Bandwidth; Amaya Lantero, GM, International, Bandwidth
- Number of employees: 200+

Voxbone S.A. is a global communication as a service (CaaS) company offering telephony applications such as conferencing platforms and call centers to send and receive phone calls, text messages and faxes.

== History ==
Voxbone was founded in Brussels, Belgium, in 2005 by Rodrigue Ullens and Francois Struman as Voxbone SA/NV. As a consultant for telecom operators, Ullens noticed the growing demand for phone numbers from other countries and decided to create the business. The founders’ mission was to offer simplified access to telephony resources through the cloud.

In August 2015 Vitruvian Partners LLP (“Vitruvian”) announced that it had acquired a majority stake in Voxbone SA.

In March 2019 Voxbone announced the launch of its enterprise platform.

On October 12, 2020 Voxbone announced its acquisition by Bandwidth for €446 million EUR. On November 2, 2020, it was announced that the deal had been finalized.

== Services ==
Voxbone provides two-way voice and messaging services from the cloud for businesses—predominantly companies that specialise in scams and cold-calling. These services include local, national, mobile and toll-free phone numbers (commonly known as direct inward dialing numbers). Voxbone also supports local number portability and offers the ability to port existing local telephone numbers from other local service providers to its network.
