= Eventis =

Moldovan mobile network operator

- Type: JSC
- Industry: Mobile telecommunications
- Founded: 2006
- Defunct: February 5, 2011
- Headquarters: Chişinău, Moldova,
- Website: eventis.md

Eventis was a mobile network operator in Moldova, employing the GSM standard on 900 and 1800 MHz frequency bands. The network was launched on 21 December 2007. In April 2010, following a decision of the country's Appeal Court (Curtea de Apel), Eventis Mobile went through an insolvency process.

The operator's coverage was available in Chişinău, Bălţi, Soroca and Orhei.

Phone numbers have +373650xxxxx format, where x - can be any number. 259 04 - are Mobile Country Code and Mobile Network Code of the operator.

Eventis' network stopped functioning on Friday, February 5, 2011 around 18:30. Websites and helpline numbers stopped functioning at once.

Eventis may well be the first operator worldwide to have ceased existing with no warning or information.
