= PEOPLEnet =

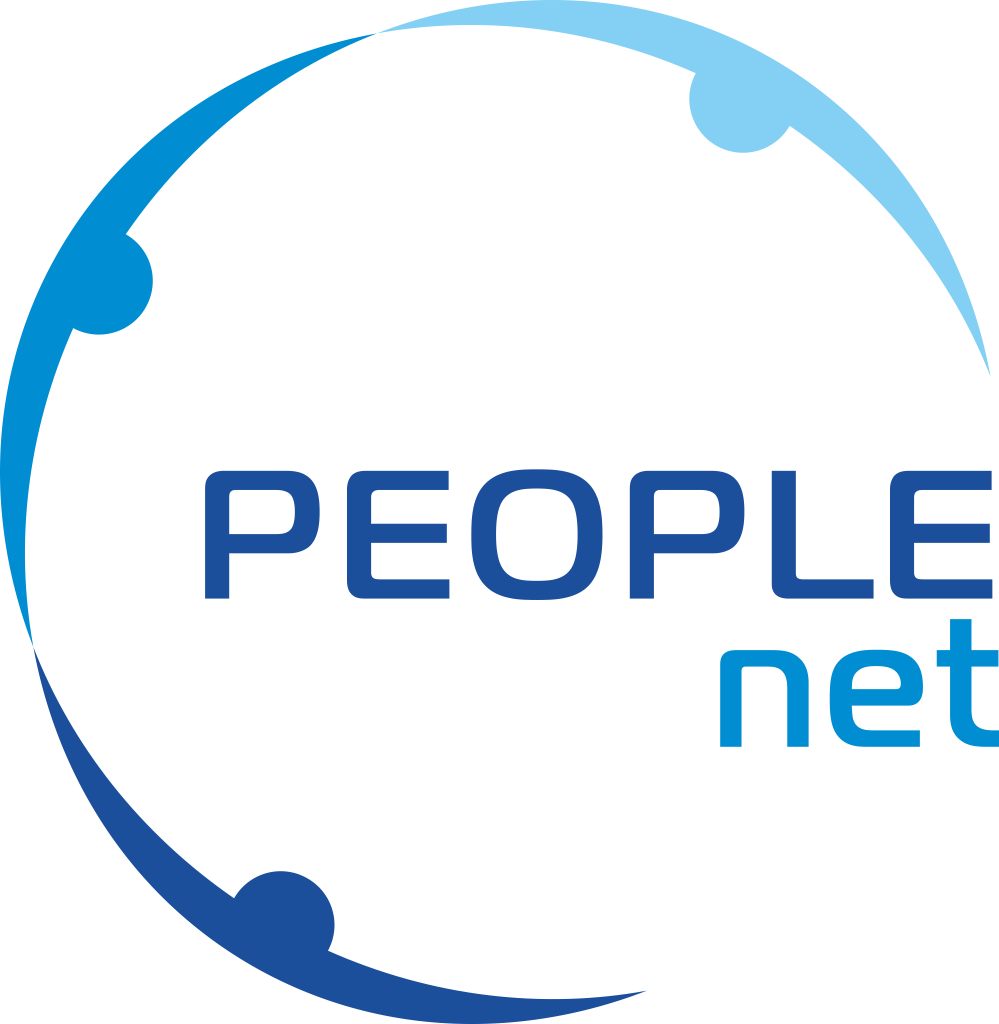
- Company type: Private Joint-stock company
- Industry: Mobile Telecommunications
- Founded: 2006
- Headquarters: Dnipro, Ukraine
- Products: Mobile phone services 3G: CDMA2000 (before 2025)
- Website: peoplenet.ua

PEOPLEnet is a telecommunications company in Ukraine founded in December 2006 by Telesystemy Ukrainy, becoming the first wireless network in Ukraine to offer 3G services (1xEV-DO standard).

By early 2009, the service was commercially available in every regional capital (oblasnyi centr) of Ukraine, as well as in a number of smaller cities.

PEOPLENet is the first mobile operator in Ukraine to offer bundled airtime plans (when a monthly fee pays for a certain amount of voice minutes, text messages and data transfer) and flexible plans (a subscriber can modify his or her daily usage and service fee every day).

On January 1, 2025 remaining CDMA2000 network was shut down.

== Criticism ==
PEOPLEnet has been criticized for building "3G" hype more on marketing than on technology. As of April 2007, not all base stations actually had the possibility to work in the 1xEV-DO mode, so that in fact a significant part of the network is actually an old 2.5G CDMA2000 1x network that previously operated under another brand name. PEOPLEnet is also being unofficially accused of playing on the anticipation of launch of "full 3G" UMTS networks that would bring not only faster rates than 1X for data-only connections, but also principally new services like video telephony. PEOPLEnet used to hide the actual type of its technical standard (CDMA2000 EV-DO) on their Web site, replacing it (even on pages with technical specifications of mobile terminals) with "3G", for example, writing "3G 1x" for phones that only support the 2.5G CDMA2000 1x technology.
