= List of LTE networks in Europe =

This is a list of commercial Long-Term Evolution (LTE) networks in Europe, grouped by their frequency bands.

Some operators use multiple bands and are therefore listed multiple times in respective sections.

== General information ==
- For technical details on LTE and a list of its designated operating frequencies, bands, and roaming possibilities, see LTE frequency bands.

Legend:	in use	partially in use	not in use	in use for 5G NR only

Note: This list of network deployments does not imply any widespread deployment or national coverage.

== Commercial deployments ==
Country or territory	Operator	VoLTE	B1 2100 MHz	B3 1800 MHz	B7 2600 MHz	B8 900 MHz	B20 800 MHz	B28 700 MHz	B32 1500 MHz	B38 2600 MHz	B40 2300 MHz	CA (Note: Carrier Aggregation) schemes	Notes
Åland Islands	Ålcom		15 MHz, UMTS	20 MHz; Mar 2015; 17.5 MHz, GSM	30 MHz, 5 MHz	4.8 MHz, 12.4 MHz, GSM	15 MHz; Apr 2015	-	-	-	-	20 MHz (Cat.4) (Mar 2015)	
Åland Islands	Telia		19.8 MHz, UMTS	20 MHz; Jun 2012; 17.5 MHz, GSM	20 MHz; Jun 2012 +10 MHz +5 MHz	17.2 MHz, GSM	15 MHz; Jun 2012	-	-	-	-		
Albania	One / 4iG		15 MHz, 15 MHz, 5 MHz, UMTS	20 MHz; Sep 2015; 5.4 MHz, 20.8 MHz, GSM	20 MHz; Jul 2015 +20 MHz	11.8 MHz, 8 MHz, GSM	10 MHz	-	-	-	-	20 MHz (Cat.4) (Jul 2015); 30 MHz (CA_3A_7A) (Cat.6) (Sep 2015)	
Albania	Vodafone		15 MHz, 10 MHz, UMTS	20 MHz; Sep 2015; 8 MHz, GSM	20 MHz; Jul 2015	8.2 MHz, 5.4 MHz, GSM	10 MHz	-	-	20 MHz	-	20 MHz (Cat.4) (Sep 2015); 30 MHz (CA_3A_7A) (Cat.6) (Sep 2015)	
Andorra	Andorra Telecom		15 MHz, UMTS +44.2 MHz	75 MHz, GSM	70 MHz	35 MHz, GSM	10 MHz; Oct 2014 +20 MHz	-	-	-	-		
Austria	3	Jul 2018	15 MHz; Jul 2017; 5 MHz, UMTS	15 MHz; Sep 2014; 5 MHz, GSM	20 MHz; Nov 2011 +5 MHz	5 MHz, GSM or 3 MHz; Jun 2018; 2 MHz, GSM	N/A	10 MHz, 5G NR	30 MHz, 5G NR	20 MHz; Sep 2019 +5 MHz	-	20 MHz (Cat.4) (Sep 2014); 40 MHz (CA_1A_3A_7A) (Cat.9) (Aug 2015); B8: pre-commercial; single sites in alpine region. B38: pre-commercial; single site(s) in Vienna.	
Austria	A1	Nov 2015	20 MHz, 5G NR 5 MHz, UMTS	20 MHz, 15 MHz; Dec 2018	20 MHz; Oct 2010 +5 MHz	5 MHz, UMTS; 10 MHz, GSM	20 MHz; Jan 2014	N/A	30 MHz	25 MHz	-	20 MHz (Cat.4) (Sep 2012); 40 MHz (CA_7A_20A) (Cat.6) (Nov 2014); 50 MHz (CA_3A_7A_20A) [256 QAM] (Dec 2016); 80 MHz (CA_1A_3A_3A_7A_20A) [4x4 MIMO, 256 QAM] (Jan 2018)	
Austria	Magenta Telekom	May 2018	15 MHz; Nov 2018	20 MHz; Sep 2014	20 MHz; Oct 2010	5 MHz, UMTS; 10 MHz, GSM	10 MHz; Jan 2014	20 MHz, 5G NR	30 MHz	N/A	-	20 MHz (Cat.4) (Mar 2014); 30 MHz (CA_7A_20A) (Cat.6) (Feb 2017); 35 MHz (CA_3A_7A) (Cat.6) (Feb 2017)	
Belarus	beCloud		-	20 MHz; Dec 2015	20 MHz; Nov 2018 +15 MHz	-	20 MHz; Aug 2020 +10 MHz	-	-	-	-	4x4 MIMO (Oct 2021); 20 MHz (Cat.4) (Dec 2015); 40 MHz (CA_3A_7A) (Cat.6) (Nov 2018); Wholesale network used by major operators and Unet (MVNO) (Jul 2016).	
Belarus	A1	Dec 2019	15 MHz, UMTS	14.4 MHz, GSM	-	4.8 MHz, UMTS; 4.4 MHz, GSM	-	-	-	-	-	LTE services via beCloud network since (Mar 2019).	
Belarus	life:)		5 MHz, 5 MHz, UMTS	9.6 MHz, GSM	-	5.4 MHz, 1.8 MHz, GSM	-	-	-	-	-	LTE services via beCloud network since (Aug 2016).	
Belarus	MTS	Apr 2022	15 MHz, UMTS	19.8 MHz, GSM	-	1.8 MHz, 7.2 MHz, GSM	-	-	-	-	-	LTE services via beCloud network since (Dec 2015).	
Belgium	Telenet (Base)	Jun 2018	14.8 MHz, UMTS	20 MHz; Oct 2013; 5 MHz, GSM	15 MHz; Oct 2013	10.2 MHz, GSM	10 MHz; May 2014	-	-	N/A	-	20 MHz (Cat.4) (Oct 2013); 20 MHz (M-MIMO) (Demo)	
Belgium	Orange	Jun 2018	14.8 MHz, UMTS	20 MHz; Mar 2014; 5 MHz, GSM	20 MHz; Jul 2016	5.6 MHz, 6 MHz, GSM	10 MHz; Mar 2014	-	-	N/A	-	20 MHz (Cat.4) (Mar 2014); 30 MHz (CA_3A_20A) (Cat.6) (May 2015)	
Belgium	Proximus	Nov 2016	10 MHz; Apr 2020; 5 MHz, UMTS	20 MHz; Nov 2012; 5 MHz, GSM	20 MHz; Dec 2014	5.6 MHz, 6 MHz, GSM	10 MHz; Dec 2014	-	-	N/A	-	256 QAM (Aug 2017); 20 MHz (Cat.4) (Oct 2015); 30 MHz (CA_3A_20A) (Cat.6) (Oct 2015); 50 MHz (CA_3A_7A_20A) (Cat.9) (Aug 2017); 50 MHz (CA_3A_7A_20A) [256 QAM] (Cat.11) (Aug 2017)	
Bulgaria	A1	Nov 2020	15 MHz; Nov 2017; 5 MHz, UMTS	25 MHz; Apr 2016; 5 MHz, GSM	20 MHz	5 MHz; Jan 2020; 4.8 MHz, UMTS; 1.8 MHz, GSM	10 MHz	10 MHz, 5G NR	-	-	-	4x4 MIMO (Apr 2016); 256 QAM (Jan 2020); 20 MHz (CA_1A_3A) (Cat.4) (Nov 2017); 15 MHz [4x4 MIMO] (Cat.6) (Apr 2016); 20 MHz [256 QAM] (Cat.11) (Apr 2016); 35 MHz (CA_1A_3A_8A) [4x4 MIMO, 256 QAM] (Cat.15) (Jan 2020)	
Bulgaria	Yettel	Jun 2018	15 MHz; Mar 2017; 5 MHz, UMTS	20 MHz; Dec 2015 +5 MHz	20 MHz	5 MHz, UMTS; 4.4 MHz, 1.8 MHz, GSM	10 MHz	15 MHz, 5G NR	-	-	-	20 MHz (CA_1A_3A) (Cat.4) (2016)	
Bulgaria	Vivacom	Aug 2018	15 MHz; Apr 2018; 5 MHz, UMTS	20 MHz; May 2016 +5 MHz; 5G NR (DSS)	20 MHz	5 MHz; Dec 2017; 4.6 MHz, UMTS; 1.6 MHz, GSM	10 MHz	10 MHz	-	-	-	20 MHz (CA_1A_3A) (Cat.4) (Apr 2018)	
Croatia	Hrvatski Telekom		15 MHz, UMTS	20 MHz; Mar 2012; 10 MHz, GSM	20 MHz	12 MHz, 2.4 MHz, GSM; UMTS	15 MHz; Dec 2012	10 MHz	-	-	-	20 MHz (Cat.4) (Feb 2015); 30 MHz (CA_3A_20A) (Cat.6) (Nov 2015)	
Croatia	Telemach		15 MHz, 10 MHz, UMTS	20 MHz; Feb 2016; 7 MHz, GSM	20 MHz; Nov 2019	5 MHz, UMTS	N/A	10 MHz	-	-	-	20 MHz (Cat.4) (Feb 2016); 40 MHz (Cat.6) (Nov 2019)	
Croatia	A1		15 MHz, UMTS	15 MHz; Mar 2012; 2.8 MHz, GSM	20 MHz	8.2 MHz, 6.2 MHz, GSM	15 MHz; Nov 2012	10 MHz	-	-	-	20 MHz (CA_3A_20A) (Cat.4) (Nov 2015); 30 MHz (CA_3A_20A) (Cat.6) (Nov 2015)	
Cyprus	Cytamobile-Vodafone		15 MHz, UMTS	20 MHz; Nov 2015; 4.8 MHz, GSM	20 MHz; Jul 2017	12.2 MHz, GSM	10 MHz; Jul 2017	-	-	15 MHz	-	256 QAM (Jul 2017); 20 MHz (Cat.4) (Nov 2015); 50 MHz (CA_3A_7A_20A) [256 QAM] (Cat.11) (Jul 2017)	
Cyprus	epic		15 MHz, UMTS	20 MHz; Mar 2015; 4.8 MHz, GSM	20 MHz; Nov 2018	12.2 MHz, GSM	10 MHz; Nov 2018	-	-	15 MHz	-	30 MHz (CA_3A-20A) (Nov 2018); 30 MHz (CA_7A-20A) (Nov 2018); 40 MHz (CA_3A-7A) (Nov 2018)	
Cyprus	PrimeTel		15 MHz, UMTS	20 MHz; Mar 2015; 4.8 MHz, GSM	-	10 MHz, GSM	-	-	-	-	-	-	
Czech Republic	O_{2}	Jan 2017	20 MHz	20 MHz; Jun 2012; 7.8 MHz, GSM	20 MHz; Apr 2019	10 MHz; Dec 2024; 2.4 MHz, GSM	10 MHz; Jul 2014	10 MHz	-	20 MHz; Dec 2017 +5 MHz	-	15 MHz (CA_3A_20A) (Cat.4) (Jul 2014); 20 MHz (CA_3A_20A) (Cat.4) (Jul 2017); 50 MHz (CA_1A_3A_20A) (CA_3A_7A_20A) [4x4 MIMO, 256 QAM] (Cat.16) (Apr 2019); 800 MHz: Infrastructure sharing with T-Mobile.	
Czech Republic	T-Mobile	May 2015	20 MHz; Dec 2015	20 MHz; Oct 2013	20 MHz, 10 MHz; Feb 2016	12.4 MHz, GSM	10 MHz; May 2014	10 MHz	-	25 MHz	-	4x4 MIMO (Feb 2017); 20 MHz (CA_1A_20A) (Cat.4) (Apr 2015); 30 MHz (CA_3A_20A) (Cat.6) (Jun 2014); 50 MHz (CA_1A_3A_20A) (Cat.9) (Dec 2015); 50 MHz (CA_3A_7A_20A) (Cat.9) (Feb 2017); 800 MHz: Infrastructure sharing with O_{2}.	
Czech Republic	Vodafone	Jul 2016	20 MHz; Dec 2014	20 MHz; Jul 2013; 5 MHz, GSM	20 MHz ?	5 MHz; Nov 2013 - Nov 2016; 10 MHz, GSM	10 MHz; Sep 2014	10 MHz	-	N/A	-	4x4 MIMO (Apr 2016); 20 MHz (Cat.4) (Mar 2014); 25 MHz (CA_3A_20A) (Cat.6) (Sep 2015); 30 MHz (CA_3A_20A) (Cat.6) (Sep 2014); 40 MHz (CA_1A_3A_20A) (Cat.9) (Oct 2015); 70 MHz (CA_1A_3A_7A_20A) (4x4 MIMO, 256 QAM) (Demo). 900 MHz: Temporary network for national coverage; phased out.	
Denmark	3	Mar 2017	15 MHz ? 2020; 5 MHz; UMTS	20 MHz, 10 MHz; Sep 2012	10 MHz; Sep 2012	10 MHz; Jan 2020; 5 MHz; UMTS	N/A	10 MHz	N/A	20 MHz; Sep 2012 +5 MHz	-	20 MHz (CA_3A_7A) (Cat.4) (Nov 2014); 20 MHz (Cat.4) (Sep 2016); 40 MHz (CA_3A_7A_38A) (Demo).	
Denmark	TDC	Nov 2015	20 MHz	20 MHz; Jul 2015	20 MHz; Oct 2011	5 MHz, UMTS; 5 MHz, GSM	20 MHz; Feb 2013	15 MHz, 5G NR +20 MHz; SDL (B67)	45 MHz	N/A	60 MHz +40 MHz	20 MHz (Cat.4) (Oct 2011); 30 MHz (CA_3A_20A) (Cat.6) (Jul 2015); 30 MHz (CA_3A_7A) (Cat.6) (Jul 2015); 40 MHz (CA_7A_20A) (Cat.6) (Jul 2015); 60 MHz (CA_3A_7A_20A) (Cat.9) (Dec 2015); 60 MHz (CA_3A_7A_20A) (4x4 MIMO, 256 QAM) (Demo).	
Denmark	TT-Netværket (Telenor, Telia)	Dec 2016	20 MHz ? 2021	20 MHz; Telia: Oct 2011; Telenor: Mar 2013; 5 MHz, GSM	20 MHz, 20 MHz; Telia: Dec 2010; Telenor: Mar 2013	5 MHz; Dec 2022; 5 MHz, GSM	10 MHz; Mar 2013	5 MHz	45 MHz	25 MHz	-	4x4 MIMO (Sep 2018); 256 QAM (Sep 2018); 20 MHz (Cat.4); Telia (Oct 2011); Telenor (Mar 2013); 40 MHz (CA_3A_7A) (Cat.6); Telia (Aug 2015); Telenor (Dec 2015); 50 MHz (CA_3A_7A_20A) [4x4 MIMO, 256 QAM] (Cat.16) (Sep 2018); 60 MHz (CA_3A_7C) (Demo). Joint infrastructure operated by TT-Netværket.	
Estonia	Elisa	Jun 2019	15 MHz	20 MHz; Feb 2013; 4.8 MHz, GSM	20 MHz; Feb 2013 +10 MHz	5 MHz, UMTS; 6.4 MHz, GSM	10 MHz; Aug 2013	10 MHz, 5G NR	-	N/A	-	20 MHz (Cat.4) (Feb 2013); 30 MHz (CA_3A_20A) (Cat.6) (Jul 2017)	
Estonia	Telia	Jul 2016	15 MHz 5G NR (DSS)	20 MHz; Dec 2011; 5 MHz, GSM	20 MHz; Dec 2010 +20 MHz	11.4 MHz, GSM	10 MHz; Jun 2013	10 MHz, 5G NR	-	40 MHz	-	20 MHz (Cat.4) (Aug 2014); 40 MHz (CA_3A_7A) (Cat.6) (Aug 2014)	
Estonia	Tele2		20 MHz; Jul 2015; 10 MHz, UMTS	20 MHz; Nov 2012; 5 MHz, GSM	N/A	5 MHz, UMTS; 6.4 MHz, GSM	10 MHz; May 2014	10 MHz, 5G NR	-	N/A	60 MHz 5G NR (DSS)	20 MHz (Cat.4) (Nov 2012); 30 MHz (CA_1A_20A) (Cat.6) (Dec 2014); 30 MHz (CA_3A_20A) (Cat.6) (Dec 2014); 40 MHz (CA_1A_3A) (Cat.6) (Dec 2014); 50 MHz (CA_1A_3A_20A) (Cat.9) (Dec 2015)	
Faroe Islands	Føroya Tele		15 MHz, UMTS	20 MHz; Dec 2015	40 MHz	10 MHz, UMTS; 1.2 MHz, 9 MHz, GSM	-	-	-	-	-	20 MHz (Cat.4) (Dec 2015)	
Faroe Islands	Nema		? MHz, UMTS	20 MHz; Jun 2015	-	13.4 MHz, GSM	-	-	-	-	-	20 MHz (Cat.4) (Jun 2015)	
Finland	DNA	Mar 2016	20 MHz; May 2016	20 MHz; Dec 2011; 4.8 MHz, GSM	20 MHz; Dec 2011	5 MHz, UMTS; 6.6 MHz, GSM	10 MHz; Jan 2014	10 MHz; Feb 2017	-	N/A	-	256 QAM (May 2016); 20 MHz (Cat.4) (Dec 2011); 30 MHz (CA_3A_20A) (Cat.6) (May 2015); 40 MHz (CA_3A_7A) (Cat.6) (May 2015); 50 MHz (CA_1A_3A_7A) (Cat.9) (Sep 2015); 50 MHz (CA_3A_7A_20A) (Cat.9) (Sep 2015) (not commercialised); 60 MHz (CA_1A_3A_7A) [256 QAM] (Cat.11) (May 2016); 800 MHz network in remote areas: Infrastructure sharing with Telia. Network operated by JV Yhteisverkko. Frequency sharing 20 MHz.	
Finland	Elisa	Nov 2016	20 MHz	20 MHz; Nov 2011; 4.8 MHz, GSM	20 MHz; Dec 2010 +5 MHz	5 MHz, UMTS; 6.4 MHz, GSM	10 MHz; Jan 2014	10 MHz ?	-	40 MHz; Aug 2015 +10 MHz	-	20 MHz (Cat.4) (Dec 2010); 40 MHz (CA_3A_7A) (Cat.6) (Mar 2015); 60 MHz (CA_1A_3A_7A) (Demo). 100 MHz (CA_1A_3A_7A_8A_20A) (4x4 MIMO, 256 QAM) (Demo)	
Finland	Telia	Nov 2018	20 MHz	20 MHz; Aug 2011; 4.8 MHz, GSM	20 MHz; Nov 2010 +5 MHz	5 MHz, UMTS; 6.4 MHz, GSM	10 MHz; Jan 2014	10 MHz ?	-	N/A	-	20 MHz (Cat.4) (Nov 2010); 40 MHz (CA_3A_7A) (Cat.6) (Dec 2014); 50 MHz (CA_3A_7A_20A) (Cat.11) (Sep 2015); 800 MHz network in remote areas: Infrastructure sharing with DNA. Network operated by JV Yhteisverkko. Frequency sharing 20 MHz.	
France	Bouygues	Nov 2015	10 MHz; Jul 2017; 4.8 MHz, UMTS	20 MHz; Sep 2013	15 MHz; Jul 2013	5 MHz, UMTS; 4.8 MHz, GSM	10 MHz; Jun 2013	5 MHz; Jul 2017	-	-	-	30 MHz (CA_3A_7A) (Cat.6) (Jun 2014); 30 MHz (CA_1A_3A) (Cat.6) (Feb 2018); 40 MHz (CA_3A_7A_20A) (Cat.9) (Nov 2015); 60 MHz (CA_1A_3A_7A_20A) (4x4 MIMO, 256 QAM) (Demo)	
France	Free	2021 (?)	10 MHz; Aug 2021; 4.8 MHz, UMTS	15 MHz; Oct 2015	20 MHz; Sep 2013	5 MHz, UMTS +2.6 MHz	N/A	10 MHz; Aug 2016	-	-	-	20 MHz (Cat.4) (Dec 2013); 30 MHz (CA_3A_7A) [4x4 MIMO] (Cat.9) (Oct 2015); 40 MHz (CA_3A_7A_28A) [4x4 MIMO, 256 QAM] (Cat.15) (Dec 2020)	
France	Orange	Jun 2016	15 MHz; Sep 2017	20 MHz; May 2016	20 MHz; Nov 2012	5 MHz, UMTS; 3.7 MHz, GSM	10 MHz; Jul 2013	10 MHz; Apr 2016	-	-	-	4x4 MIMO (Jul 2017); 256 QAM (Jul 2017); 20 MHz (Cat.4) (Jan 2014); 30 MHz (CA_3A_7A) (Cat.6) (Jul 2014); 50 MHz (CA_3A_7A_20A) [4x4 MIMO, 256 QAM] (Cat.16) (Jul 2017)	
France	SFR	May 2017	10 MHz; Aug 2017; 4.8 MHz, UMTS	20 MHz; Jan 2016	15 MHz; May 2013	5 MHz, UMTS; 3.7 MHz, GSM	10 MHz; Jun 2013	5 MHz	-	-	-	20 MHz (Cat.4) (Jan 2016); 25 MHz (CA_7A_20A) (Cat.6) (Oct 2014); 45 MHz (CA_3A_7A_20A) (Cat.9) (May 2016); 55 MHz (CA_1A_3A_7A_20A) (Cat.11) (Jul 2018)	
Germany	O_{2}	Apr 2015	20 MHz; Sep 2018	20 MHz; Sep 2017; 5G NR (DSS)	20 MHz; Jul 2013 +10 MHz	5 MHz; Apr 2020 + 5 MHz, GSM	10 MHz; Jul 2011	10 MHz, 5G NR	N/A	10 MHz + 10 MHz	-	256 QAM (Sep 2018); 64 QAM UL (Jul 2018); EVS (Aug 2018); 20 MHz (Cat.4) (Sep 2016); 30 MHz (CA_7A_20A) (Cat.6) (Sep 2016); 30 MHz (CA_3A_20A) (Cat.6) (Sep 2017); 30 MHz (CA_1A_3A) (Cat.6) (Sep 2018); B8: available in rural areas.	
Germany	Telekom	Jan 2016	20 MHz; Jun 2020; 5G NR (DSS)	20 MHz; Jul 2011; 10 MHz; Oct 2016	20 MHz; Aug 2013	10 MHz; Mar 2017 5 MHz, GSM	10 MHz; Apr 2011	10 MHz, 5G NR	20 MHz; Aug 2021	5 MHz	-	4x4 MIMO (Dec 2017); 256 QAM (Sep 2017); 64 QAM UL (Oct 2017); EVS (May 2017); 20 MHz (Cat.4) (Sep 2013); 40 MHz (CA_3A_7A) (Cat.6) (Nov 2014); 40 MHz (CA_3C_20A) (Cat.6) (Oct 2016); 50 MHz (CA_3A_7A_20A) (Cat.9) (Sep 2017); 50 MHz (CA_3A_7A_20A) [256 QAM] (Cat.11) (Sep 2017); B32: single sites for FWB in rural areas.	
Germany	Vodafone	May 2015	20 MHz; Oct 2017	20 MHz; Sep 2016; 5G NR (DSS) +5 MHz	20 MHz; Aug 2013	5 MHz; Sep 2019 5 MHz, GSM	10 MHz; Dec 2010	10 MHz; Jul 2019; 5G NR (DSS)	20 MHz; Oct 2017	20 MHz; Sep 2016 +5 MHz	-	4x4 MIMO (Oct 2017); 256 QAM (May 2017); 64 QAM UL (Apr 2018); 2CA 64 QAM UL (Apr 2018); EVS (Dec 2016); 20 MHz (Cat.4) (Aug 2013); 30 MHz (CA_7A_20A) (Cat.6) (Apr 2015); 50 MHz (CA_3A_7A_20A) (Cat.9) (Sep 2016); 50 MHz (CA_3A_7A_20A) [256 QAM] (Cat.11) (May 2017); 60 MHz (CA_3A_7A_32A) [4x4 MIMO, 256 QAM] (Cat.18) (Oct 2017) (single sites in selected cities); B8: available in rural areas. B38: pre-commercial; single sites.	
Greece	Cosmote		20 MHz	20 MHz; 15 MHz; Nov 2012	20 MHz; 10 MHz; Jan 2015	10 MHz, GSM	10 MHz; Mar 2015	10 MHz	-	20 MHz	-	256 QAM (Dec 2016); 20 MHz (Cat.4) (Nov 2012); 40 MHz (CA_3A_7A) (Cat.6) (Mar 2015); 50 MHz (CA_3A_7A_20A) (Cat.9) (Oct 2015); 50 MHz (CA_3A_7A_20A) [256 QAM] (Cat.11) (Dec 2016)	
Greece	Vodafone		20 MHz	20 MHz; Jun 2013; 5 MHz, GSM	20 MHz; Feb 2015	15 MHz, GSM	10 MHz	10 MHz	-	20 MHz	-	20 MHz (Cat.4) (Jun 2013); 40 MHz (CA_3A_7A) (Cat.6) (Feb 2015); 50 MHz (CA_3A_7A_20A) (Demo)	
Greece	NOVA		20 MHz; Mar 2023	15 MHz; Mar 2015	20 MHz	10 MHz, GSM	10 MHz	10 MHz	-	N/A	-		
Hungary	Digi / 4iG	May 2019	-	5 MHz; May 2019	N/A	N/A	N/A	-	-	-	-		
Hungary	Yettel	Jan 2019	15 MHz; Nov 2023; 5G NR (DSS)	20 MHz; Jul 2012	20 MHz; May 2016	10 MHz; 5 MHz, GSM	10 MHz; Feb 2015	5 MHz	-	-	-	20 MHz (Cat.4) (Oct 2013); 40 MHz (CA_3A_7A) (Cat.6) (May 2016); 800 MHz: Infrastructure sharing with Magyar Telekom.	
Hungary	Magyar Telekom		15 MHz, 10 MHz	20 MHz; Jan 2012; 10 MHz, GSM	20 MHz, 10 MHz; Oct 2014	10 MHz, GSM	10 MHz; Oct 2014	10 MHz	-	-	-	256 QAM (Nov 2016); 20 MHz (Cat.4) (Oct 2014); 40 MHz (CA_3A_7A) (Cat.6) (Dec 2015); 50 MHz (CA_3A_7A_20A) [256 QAM] (Cat.11) (Nov 2016); 800 MHz: Infrastructure sharing with Telenor.	
Hungary	Vodafone / 4iG		20 MHz; Apr 2023; 5G NR (DSS)	20 MHz; Feb 2017	20 MHz; Nov 2014	10 MHz, GSM	10 MHz; Nov 2014	10 MHz; 5G NR (DSS)	-	25 MHz	-	20 MHz (Cat.4) (Nov 2014); 30 MHz (CA_3A_20A) (Cat.6) (Feb 2017)	
Iceland	Nova		10 MHz ? 10 MHz, UMTS	20 MHz; Apr 2013	20 MHz	5 MHz, GSM	10 MHz ?	-	-	-	-	Infrastructure sharing with Sýn.	
Iceland	Sýn		10 MHz ? 10 MHz, UMTS	20 MHz; Apr 2013	20 MHz	5 MHz, UMTS; 10 MHz, GSM	20 MHz; Apr 2013	-	-	-	-	Infrastructure sharing with Nova.	
Iceland	Síminn		20 MHz, UMTS	20 MHz, 10 MHz; Jan 2014	20 MHz; Jul 2017	5 MHz, UMTS; 9.8 MHz, GSM	N/A	20 MHz	-	-	-	20 MHz (Cat.4) (Apr 2015); 30 MHz (CA_3C) (Cat.6) (Dec 2016); 40 MHz (CA_3A_7A) (Cat.6) (Jul 2017)	
Ireland	3	Aug 2022	15 MHz, Feb 2021; 5 MHz, UMTS	20 MHz, 15 MHz; Jan 2014	35 MHz	5+5 MHz, UMTS; 5 MHz, GSM	10 MHz; Jul 2014	10 MHz	-	-	-	20 MHz (Cat.4) (Jan 2014); 30 MHz (CA_3A_20A) (Cat.6) (Apr 2016); Infrastructure sharing with eir.	
Ireland	eir	Feb 2021	15 MHz; Dec 2020; 5 MHz, UMTS	15 MHz; Sep 2013; 5G NR (DSS)	-	5 MHz, GSM; 5 MHz, UMTS	10 MHz; Sep 2013	10 MHz	-	-	60 MHz	Infrastructure sharing with 3.	
Ireland	Vodafone	Mar 2019	20 MHz 5G NR (DSS)	20 MHz; Dec 2014; 5 MHz, GSM	35 MHz	10 MHz, GSM	10 MHz; Oct 2013	10 MHz	-	30 MHz	-	20 MHz (CA_3A_20A) (Cat.4) (Dec 2014); 20 MHz (Cat.4) (Jul 2015); 30 MHz (CA_3A_20A) (Cat.6) (Jul 2015); 40 MHz (CA_3A_7A) (UL-CA, 64 QAM) (Demo). 50 MHz (CA_3A_7A_20A) (4x4 MIMO, 256 QAM) (Demo).	
Italy	Iliad		10 MHz; May 2018	10 MHz; May 2018	10 MHz; May 2018	5 MHz, UMTS	N/A	10 MHz; 5G NR (DSS)	N/A	-	-	20 MHz (CA_3A_7A) (Cat.4) (May 2018)	
Italy	TIM	Dec 2015	15 MHz	20 MHz; Nov 2012	15 MHz; Nov 2014	9.8 MHz, GSM	10 MHz; Nov 2014	10 MHz, 5G NR	20 MHz; Dec 2016	-	-	256 QAM (Dec 2016); 20 MHz (Cat.4) (Nov 2012); 25 MHz (CA_3A_20A) (Cat.6) (Nov 2014); 25 MHz (CA_7A_20A) (Cat.6) (Nov 2014); 30 MHz (CA_3A_7A) (Cat.6) (Mar 2015); 40 MHz (CA_3A_7A_20A) (Cat.9) (Nov 2015); 50 MHz (CA_3A_20A_32A) [256 QAM] (Cat.11) (Dec 2016); 65 MHz (CA_3A_7A_20A_32A) (256 QAM) (Demo)	
Italy	Vodafone	Jul 2015	15 MHz, Mar 2017; 5G NR (DSS)	20 MHz; Nov 2012	15 MHz; Dec 2014	9.6 MHz, GSM	10 MHz; Dec 2014	10 MHz; 5G NR (DSS)	20 MHz; Nov 2017	-	-	256 QAM (Nov 2017); 4x4 MIMO (Mar 2018); 20 MHz (Cat.4) (Dec 2014); 30 MHz (CA_3A_7A) (Cat.6) (Dec 2014); 30 MHz (CA_3A_20A) (Cat.6) (Dec 2014); 55 MHz (CA_3A_7A_32A) [256 QAM] (Cat.11) (Nov 2017); 50 MHz (CA_3A_20A_32A) [4x4 MIMO, 256 QAM] (Cat.16) (Mar 2018); 55 MHz (CA_3A_7A_32A) [4x4 MIMO, 256 QAM] (Cat.16) (Mar 2018)	
Italy	Wind Tre		15 MHz; Jul 2019; 5 MHz, UMTS	20 MHz; Nov 2012; 5G NR (DSS)	20 MHz; Jan 2017; 5G NR (DSS)	5 MHz, UMTS; 4.6 MHz, GSM	10 MHz; Jan 2014	-	N/A	30 MHz	-	20 MHz (CA_3A_20A) (Cat.4) (Jan 2014); 20 MHz (Cat.4) (Jan 2017)	
Kosovo	IPKO		-	20 MHz; Dec 2014 +5 MHz	-	5 MHz, UMTS; 5 MHz, GSM	-	-	-	-	-		
Kosovo	Vala		-	20 MHz; Apr 2015; 5 MHz, GSM	-	5 MHz, UMTS; 5 MHz, GSM	-	-	-	-	-		
Latvia	Bite		20 MHz, UMTS	20 MHz; May 2015; 5 MHz, GSM	20 MHz; May 2015	10 MHz, GSM	10 MHz; Jul 2015	-	20 MHz	N/A	30 MHz	20 MHz (Cat.4) (May 2015); 40 MHz (CA_3A_7A) (Cat.6) (May 2015)	
Latvia	LMT		20 MHz, UMTS	10 MHz; May 2011; 14.8 MHz, GSM	10 MHz; Nov 2014 +10 MHz	5 MHz, UMTS; 7.2 MHz, GSM	10 MHz; Jul 2015	-	20 MHz	50 MHz	30 MHz	20 MHz (CA_3A_7A) (Cat.4) (Nov 2014)	
Latvia	Tele2		20 MHz, UMTS	20 MHz, 5 MHz; Dec 2013	20 MHz; Jan 2014	11.7 MHz, GSM	10 MHz; Jul 2015	-	20 MHz	N/A	-	256 QAM (Dec 2017); 20 MHz (CA_3A_7A) (Cat.4) (Dec 2013); 30 MHz (CA_3A_20A) (Cat.6) (Dec 2015); 30 MHz (CA_7A_20A) (Cat.6) (Dec 2015); 40 MHz (CA_3A_7A) (Cat.6) (Dec 2015); 50 MHz (CA_3A_7A_20A) (Cat.9) (Dec 2015); 55 MHz (CA_3C_7A_20A) (Cat.11) (Dec 2017)	
Liechtenstein	Salt (7acht)		19.8 MHz, UMTS	20 MHz; Sep 2013; 10 MHz, GSM	20 MHz	10 MHz, GSM	-	-	-	-	-	20 MHz (Cat.4) (Dec 2013)	
Liechtenstein	Swisscom	Jun 2015	19.6 MHz, UMTS	20 MHz; Mar 2015; 10 MHz, 15 MHz, GSM	20 MHz	5 MHz (?); 5 MHz, GSM	-	-	-	-	-	20 MHz (Cat.4) (Mar 2015)	
Liechtenstein	Telecom Liechtenstein (FL1)		19.8 MHz, UMTS	N/A	20 MHz	10 MHz, GSM	20 MHz; Feb 2015	-	-	-	-	20 MHz (Cat.4) (Feb 2015)	
Lithuania	Bite	Feb 2022	19.8 MHz, UMTS	20 MHz; Apr 2015; 5 MHz, GSM	20 MHz; Apr 2015 +10 MHz	11.6 MHz, GSM	10 MHz; Apr 2015	5 MHz	-	50 MHz	20 MHz; Nov 2015 +60 MHz	20 MHz (Cat.4) (Apr 2015); 30 MHz (CA_3A_20A) (Cat.6) (Apr 2015); 40 MHz (CA_3A_7A) (Cat.6) (Apr 2015)	
Lithuania	Telia	Oct 2017	20 MHz; Jul 2018	20 MHz; Apr 2011; 5 MHz, GSM	20 MHz; Dec 2014	5 MHz; Dec 2022; 6.1 MHz, 1.6 MHz, GSM	10 MHz; Oct 2013	10 MHz	-	-	-	256 QAM (May 2017); 20 MHz (Cat.4) (Dec 2014); 30 MHz (CA_3A_20A) (Cat.6) (Dec 2014); 50 MHz (CA_3A_7A_20A) (Cat.9) (Dec 2015); 50 MHz (CA_3A_7A_20A) [256 QAM] (Cat.11) (May 2017)	
Lithuania	Tele2		19.8 MHz, UMTS	20 MHz; Sep 2013; 5 MHz, GSM	20 MHz; Mar 2013	5 MHz, UMTS; 6.6 MHz, GSM	10 MHz; Sep 2013	5 MHz	-	-	-	20 MHz (Cat.4) (Mar 2013); 25 MHz (CA_3A_20A) (Cat.6) (Aug 2015); 50 MHz (CA_3A_7A_20A) (Cat.9) (Dec 2015)	
Luxembourg	Orange		14.85 MHz, UMTS	20 MHz; Oct 2012; 5 MHz, GSM	20 MHz	9.8 MHz, GSM	10 MHz	10 MHz	-	N/A	-	20 MHz (Cat.4) (Jan 2013)	
Luxembourg	POST		14.85 MHz, UMTS	20 MHz; Oct 2013; 5 MHz, GSM	20 MHz	4.6 MHz, 7.4 MHz, GSM	10 MHz	10 MHz	-	N/A	-		
Luxembourg	Tango	Jul 2018	14.85 MHz, UMTS	20 MHz; Oct 2012; 5 MHz, GSM	20 MHz	4.6 MHz, 7.4 MHz, GSM	10 MHz; Dec 2014	10 MHz	-	N/A	-	20 MHz (Cat.4) (Oct 2012); 30 MHz (CA_3A_20A) (Cat.6) (Dec 2014)	
Malta	Epic		19.8 MHz, UMTS	20 MHz, 5 MHz; Nov 2013	30 MHz	15 MHz, GSM	10 MHz	-	-	-	-	20 MHz (Cat.4) (Nov 2015); 25 MHz (CA_3C) (Cat.6) (Jun 2017)	
Malta	GO		19.8 MHz, UMTS	20 MHz; Dec 2015	40 MHz	15 MHz, GSM	10 MHz; Apr 2018	-	-	-	-	20 MHz (Cat.4) (Dec 2015); 30 MHz (CA_3A_20A) (Cat.6) (Apr 2018)	
Malta	Melita		10 MHz; Mar 2018; 9.8 MHz, UMTS	-	N/A	5 MHz, GSM	10 MHz; May 2018	-	-	-	-	256 QAM (May 2018); 20 MHz (CA_1A_20A) (Cat.11) (May 2018)	
Moldova	Moldcell		14.8 MHz, UMTS	25 MHz, GSM	20 MHz; Nov 2012	10 MHz, GSM	10 MHz	-	-	-	-		
Moldova	Orange		14.8 MHz, UMTS	20 MHz; Feb 2016; 5 MHz, GSM	20 MHz; Nov 2012	10 MHz, 5 MHz, GSM	20 MHz; Feb 2016	-	-	-	-	20 MHz (Cat.4) (Feb 2014); 40 MHz (CA_3A_7A) (Cat.6) (Feb 2016); 40 MHz (CA_3A_20A) (Cat.6) (Feb 2016)	
Moldova	Unité		14.8 MHz, UMTS	20 MHz + 5 MHz; Oct 2015	-	5 MHz, UMTS	N/A	-	-	-	-	20 MHz (Cat.4) (Oct 2015); 25 MHz (CA_3C) (Cat.6) (Oct 2015)	
Montenegro	One / 4iG	Sep 2023	20 MHz, UMTS	20 MHz; Nov 2012; 5 MHz, GSM	-	15 MHz, GSM	N/A	-	-	-	-		
Montenegro	Crnogorski Telekom	Sep 2023	15 MHz, 5 MHz, UMTS	20 MHz; Nov 2013; 5 MHz, GSM	10 MHz; Jan 2017	10 MHz, GSM	20 MHz; Jan 2017	-	-	5 MHz	-	4x4 MIMO (Jun 2019); 256 QAM (Jun 2019); 20 MHz (Cat.4) (Jul 2014); 40 MHz (CA_3A_20A) (Cat.6) (Jan 2017); 50 MHz (CA_3A_7A_20A) (Cat.9) (Jan 2017); 50 MHz (CA_3A_7A_20A) [4x4 MIMO or 256 QAM] (Cat.11) (Jun 2019)	
Netherlands	KPN	Oct 2016	20 MHz; Feb 2018	20 MHz; Jun 2014	10 MHz; May 2012	10 MHz, GSM	10 MHz; Feb 2013	10 MHz, 5G NR	15 MHz	20 MHz; Feb 2018 +10 MHz	-	256 QAM (Feb 2018); 20 MHz (Cat.4) (Jun 2014); 30 MHz (CA_3A_20A) (Cat.6) (Sep 2014); 50 MHz (CA_1A_3A_7A_20A) [256 QAM] (Cat.11) (Feb 2018); 60 MHz (CA_3A_7A_20A_38A) [256 QAM] (Cat.11) (Feb 2018)	
Netherlands	Odido	Oct 2017 (T-Mobile); Dec 2016 (Tele2)	20 MHz; Nov 2016	20 MHz; Nov 2013; 10 MHz; Jun 2023	20 MHz; May 2012 +5 MHz +5 MHz	10 MHz; May 2015; 5 MHz, UMTS	10 MHz; Jan 2015	10 MHz, 5G NR	10 MHz	20 MHz; Aug 2017	-	256 QAM (Aug 2017); 20 MHz (Cat.4) (Oct 2014); 20 MHz (Cat.4) (Jan 2015) (Tele2); 30 MHz (CA_7A_20A) (Cat.6) (Nov 2015) (Tele2); 30 MHz (CA_3A_8A) (Cat.6) (Jan 2016); 40 MHz (CA_1A_3A_8A) (Cat.9) (Nov 2016); 45 MHz (CA_1A_3A_8A) [256 QAM] (Cat.11) (Aug 2017); 50 MHz (CA_3A_8A_38A) [256 QAM] (Cat.11) (Aug 2017)	
Netherlands	Vodafone	Nov 2016	20 MHz; Feb 2020	20 MHz; Aug 2013	20 MHz; May 2012 +10 MHz	10 MHz, GSM	10 MHz; Aug 2013	10 MHz	15 MHz	N/A	-	20 MHz (Cat.4) (Sep 2014); 30 MHz (CA_3A_20A) (Cat.6) (Sep 2014)	
North Macedonia	A1	Sep 2025	20 MHz	20 MHz, 15 MHz; Jul 2014 +5 MHz	-	5 MHz, UMTS; 7.5 MHz, GSM	10 MHz, 10 MHz; Jul 2014	10 MHz; Jul 2022	-	-	-	20 MHz (Cat.4) (Jul 2014)	
North Macedonia	Makedonski Telekom	Dec 2019	20 MHz, 10 MHz; Feb 2022; 5G NR (DSS)	20 MHz; Dec 2013 +5 MHz	-	5 MHz, UMTS; 7.5 MHz, GSM	10 MHz; Dec 2013	10 MHz; Jul 2022	-	-	-	20 MHz (Cat.4) (Dec 2013); 30 MHz (CA_3A_20A) (Cat.6) (Nov 2015)	
Norway	Net 1 (ice.net)		20 MHz	20 MHz; Jun 2015	N/A	5 MHz; Jun 2015	10 MHz; Jun 2015	10 MHz	-	N/A	-	20 MHz (Cat.4) (Jun 2015)	
Norway	Tampnet		-	20 MHz; 2013 ?	-	-	15 MHz; 2013 ?	15 MHz	-	N/A	-	Limited offshore coverage in the Norwegian North Sea.	
Norway	Telia	Oct 2016	20 MHz	20 MHz; Oct 2011; 5 MHz, GSM	30 MHz; Dec 2009	14.8 MHz, GSM	10 MHz; Apr 2014	10 MHz	-	N/A	-	20 MHz (Cat.4) (Dec 2009); 40 MHz (CA_3A_7A) (Cat.6) (Feb 2015); 70 MHz (CA_1A_3A_7A_20A) (4x4 MIMO) (Demo). World's first LTE network.	
Norway	Telenor	Jan 2016	19.8 MHz, UMTS	20 MHz, Oct 2012; 10 MHz, GSM	40 MHz; Oct 2012	15.1 MHz, GSM	10 MHz; Mar 2014	10 MHz	-	N/A	-	20 MHz (Cat.4) (Oct 2012); 30 MHz (CA_3A_7A) (Cat.6) (Apr 2015); 30 MHz (CA_3A_20A) (Cat.6) (Apr 2015); 40 MHz (CA_3A_7A) (Cat.6) (Apr 2015); 60 MHz (CA_3A_7C) (Cat.9) (Jan 2016)	
Poland	Cyfrowy Polsat (Plus / Aero2)		5-10 MHz; Oct 2017; 4.8 MHz, UMTS	20 MHz; Sep 2010; 7.5 MHz, 2.4 MHz, GSM	20 MHz; Aug 2016	5 MHz; May 2018; 5 MHz, UMTS; 2.8 MHz, 1.2 MHz, GSM	5 MHz; Mar 2015; License expired in Dec 2018	-	-	40 MHz; May 2011 +10 MHz	-	256 QAM (Oct 2017); 20 MHz (Cat.4) (Nov 2012); 40 MHz (CA_3A_7A) (Cat.6) (Aug 2016); 50 MHz (CA_1A_3A_7A) [256 QAM] (Cat.11) (Oct 2017)	
Poland	Orange	Oct 2016	15 MHz; May 2018	10 MHz, Sep 2013	15 MHz; Feb 2016	4.2 MHz, UMTS; 2.6 MHz, GSM	10 MHz; Feb 2016	-	-	N/A	-	30 MHz (CA_3A_7A) (Cat.6) (Sep 2016); 40 MHz (CA_3A_7A_20A) (Cat.9) (Sep 2016); 45 MHz (CA_1A_3A_7A_20A) (Cat.9) (Mar 2018); 4x4 MIMO, 256 QAM (Cat.11) (Demo)	
Poland	Play		15 MHz; Jan 2015	10-15 MHz; Nov 2013; 0-5 MHz, GSM	20 MHz; Aug 2016	4.2 MHz, UMTS; 0.8 MHz, GSM	5 MHz; Aug 2016	-	-	N/A	-	20 MHz (Cat.4) (Aug 2016); 35 MHz (CA_1A_3A_7A) (Cat.9) (Aug 2016); 35 MHz (CA_1A_7A_20A) (Cat.9) (Aug 2016); 35 MHz (CA_3A_7A_20A) (Cat.9) (Aug 2016)	
Poland	T-Mobile	Nov 2016	20 MHz; Jun 2014	10 MHz; Jun 2014; 7.2 MHz, 2.6 MHz; GSM	15 MHz; Feb 2016	4.2 MHz, UMTS; 4.6 MHz, GSM	10 MHz; Feb 2016	-	-	N/A	-	256 QAM (Jun 2017); 40 MHz (CA_3A_7A_20A) (Cat.9) (Mar 2017); 45 MHz (CA_1A_3A_7A_20A) (Cat.9) (Mar 2018); 40 MHz (CA_1A_3A_7A_20A) [256 QAM] (Cat.11) (Jun 2017)	
Portugal	Meo		20 MHz; Nov 2017	20 MHz; Sep 2012	20 MHz; Mar 2012	10 MHz, GSM	10 MHz; Apr 2012	5 MHz, 5G NR	-	-	-	20 MHz (Cat.4) (Oct 2014); 30 MHz (CA_7A_20A) (Cat.6) (Oct 2014); 40 MHz (CA_3A_7A) (Cat.6) (Oct 2014)	
Portugal	NOS	Dec 2020	15 MHz; 5 MHz; UMTS	20 MHz; Oct 2012	20 MHz; Mar 2012	5 MHz, UMTS; 5 MHz, GSM	10 MHz; Apr 2012	10 MHz, 5G NR	-	-	-	20 MHz (Cat.4) (Oct 2012); 30 MHz (CA_3A_20A) (Cat.6) (Nov 2015); 30 MHz (CA_7A_20A) (Cat.6) (Nov 2015); 40 MHz (CA_3A_7A) (Cat.6) (Nov 2015)	
Portugal	Vodafone	Sep 2015	15 MHz; 5 MHz; UMTS	20 MHz; Oct 2012	20 MHz; Mar 2012	5 MHz, UMTS; 5 MHz, GSM	10 MHz; Apr 2012	10 MHz, 5G NR	-	20 MHz +5 MHz	-	20 MHz (Cat.4) (Oct 2014); 40 MHz (CA_3A_7A) (Cat.6) (Oct 2014); 60 MHz (CA_3A_7A_38A) (256 QAM) (Demo)	
Romania	Digi.Mobil	Oct 2017	15 MHz; Oct 2016	N/A	20 MHz, 20 MHz	5 MHz, GSM	5 MHz; Jan 2022	-	-	20 MHz, 20 MHz; Mar 2015	-	20 MHz (Cat.4) (Oct 2015)	
Romania	Orange	Sep 2015	10 MHz 5G NR (DSS) 4.8 MHz, UMTS	20 MHz; Dec 2012	20 MHz; Sep 2014	5 MHz, UMTS; 5 MHz, GSM	10 MHz; Jan 2014	10 MHz	20 MHz, 20 MHz	-	-	256 QAM (Mar 2018); EVS (Jan 2019); 20 MHz (Cat.4) (Apr 2014); 40 MHz (CA_3A_7A) (Cat.6) (Sep 2014); 50 MHz (CA_3A_7A_20A) (Cat.9) (Mar 2016); 50 MHz (CA_3A_7A_20A) [256 QAM] (Cat.11) (Mar 2018); 800 MHz: Infrastructure sharing with Vodafone.	
Romania	Telekom	Aug 2022	15 MHz; Mar 2023	20 MHz; Apr 2013; 5 MHz, GSM	10 MHz	5 MHz; 5 MHz, GSM	5 MHz	-	-	-	-	20 MHz (Cat.4) (Apr 2014)	
Romania	Vodafone	Nov 2019	10 MHz; Aug 2021 5G NR (DSS) 4.8 MHz, UMTS	20 MHz, 10 MHz; Nov 2012	-	5 MHz, UMTS; 5 MHz, GSM	10 MHz; Sep 2014	-	-	-	-	256 QAM (Oct 2017); 20 MHz (Cat.4) (Apr 2014); 30 MHz (CA_3A_20A) (Cat.6) (Sep 2014); 40 MHz (CA_3C_20A) [256 QAM] (Cat.11) (Oct 2017); 800 MHz: Infrastructure sharing with Orange.	
Serbia	MTS		10 MHz; 5 MHz, UMTS	20 MHz; Apr 2015	-	5 MHz, UMTS; 4.6 MHz, GSM	10 MHz ?	-	-	-	-	20 MHz (Cat.4) (Apr 2015)	
Serbia	Yettel		15 MHz	20 MHz; Mar 2015	-	5 MHz, UMTS; 2.6 MHz, 2 MHz, GSM	10 MHz; May 2017	-	-	-	-	20 MHz (Cat.4) (Mar 2015); 30 MHz (CA_3A_20A) (Cat.6) (May 2017)	
Serbia	A1		10 MHz; 5 MHz, UMTS	20 MHz, 10 MHz; Mar 2015	-	4.2 MHz, GSM	10 MHz; Jan 2016	-	-	-	-	20 MHz (Cat.4) (Mar 2015); 30 MHz (CA_3A_20A) (Cat.6) (Jan 2016)	
Slovakia	O_{2}		20 MHz, UMTS	20 MHz; Dec 2014	N/A	frag- mented, GSM	10 MHz; Dec 2014	10 MHz	-	N/A	-		
Slovakia	Orange		20 MHz, UMTS	15 MHz; Mar 2022	20 MHz, 10 MHz; Jul 2014	frag- mented, GSM	10 MHz; Jul 2014	10 MHz	-	N/A	-	20 MHz (Cat.4) (Jul 2014); 30 MHz (CA_7A_20A) (Cat.6) (Dec 2015); 40 MHz (CA_7C_20A) (Cat.6) (Jul 2019); 40 MHz (CA_7C_20A) [4x4 MIMO, 256 QAM] (Cat.15) (Aug 2020)	
Slovakia	Telekom	Jul 2022	20 MHz; Dec 2020	20 MHz; Nov 2013	20 MHz, 20 MHz; Apr 2014	frag- mented, GSM	10 MHz; Aug 2014	10 MHz	-	50 MHz	-	20 MHz (Cat.4) (Apr 2014); 30 MHz (CA_3A_7A) (Cat.6) (Jun 2015); 40 MHz (CA_7C) (Cat.6) (Nov 2015); 50 MHz (CA_3A_7C), (CA_7C_20A) (Cat.9) (Dec 2016); 50 MHz (CA_3A_7C), (CA_7C_20A) [256 QAM] (Cat.11) (Jun 2018)	
Slovakia	4ka	Oct 2016	N/A	15 MHz; Mar 2015; 5 MHz, GSM	N/A	N/A	N/A	-	-	N/A	-		
Slovenia	A1		15 MHz; Jun 2023	20 MHz; Jul 2012; 10 MHz, GSM	20 MHz; Nov 2014 +15 MHz	5 MHz; Jun 2023; 10 MHz, GSM	10 MHz; Jun 2014	-	-	25 MHz	-	20 MHz (Cat.4) (Aug 2014); 40 MHz (CA_3A_7A) (Cat.6) (Nov 2014)	
Slovenia	Telekom Slovenije	Mar 2017	20 MHz; Mar 2015	20 MHz; 5 MHz; Mar 2013	20 MHz; 15 MHz; Dec 2014	5 MHz; Sep 2014; 10 MHz, GSM	10 MHz; Jun 2014	-	-	25 MHz	-	20 MHz (Cat.4) (Mar 2014); 30 MHz (CA_3A_20A) (Cat.6) (Mar 2015); 40 MHz (CA_3A_7A) (Cat.6) (Dec 2014); 60 MHz (CA_3C_7C) (Cat.11) (Oct 2017); 50 MHz (CA_3A_7C) [4x4 MIMO, 256 QAM] (Cat.16) (Oct 2017) (Demo).	
Slovenia	Telemach		5 MHz, UMTS	10 MHz; Jun 2015; 10 MHz, GSM	N/A	5 MHz, UMTS	10 MHz; Jun 2015	-	-	N/A	-		
Spain	Movistar	Sep 2019	15 MHz, UMTS	20 MHz; Sep 2013	20 MHz; Oct 2014	4.8 MHz, UMTS; 10 MHz, GSM	10 MHz; Jan 2015	10 MHz	-	N/A	-	20 MHz (Cat.4) (Sep 2013); 40 MHz (CA_3A_7A) (Cat.6) (Oct 2014)	
Spain	Orange	Nov 2016	15 MHz, UMTS	20 MHz; Jul 2013	20 MHz; Jul 2013	5 MHz, UMTS; 5 MHz, GSM	10 MHz; Mar 2015	10 MHz	-	10 MHz	-	20 MHz (Cat.4) (Mar 2014); 40 MHz (CA_3A_7A) (Cat.6) (Mar 2014); 45 MHz (CA_3A_7A_20A) (Cat.9) (Sep 2015)	
Spain	Vodafone	Jul 2015	15 MHz, UMTS	20 MHz; May 2013	20 MHz; May 2013	5 MHz, UMTS; 5 MHz, GSM	10 MHz; Jan 2015	10 MHz	-	20 MHz; May 2016	-	256 QAM (Jul 2017); 20 MHz (Cat.4) (May 2013); 40 MHz (CA_3A_7A) (Cat.6) (Oct 2014); 45 MHz (CA_3A_7A_20A) (Cat.9) (Feb 2016); 60 MHz (CA_3A_7A_38A) (Cat.9) (May 2016); 70 MHz (CA_3A_7A_20A_38A) [256 QAM] (Cat.15) (Jul 2017)	
Spain	Yoigo		15 MHz, UMTS	10 MHz; Jul 2013; 4.8 MHz, GSM	N/A	N/A	N/A	-	-	N/A	-		
Sweden	3	Feb 2017	20 MHz 5G NR (DSS)	5 MHz	10 MHz; Apr 2012	5 MHz, UMTS	10 MHz; Apr 2012	N/A	-	40 MHz; Apr 2012 5G NR (DSS)	-	20 MHz (CA_7A_20A) (Cat.4) (Dec 2015); 60 MHz (CA_7A_20A_38C) (Demo).	
Sweden	Net4Mobility (Telenor / Tele2)		Telenor: 19.8 MHz, UMTS	20 MHz, 15 MHz; Jan 2013	20 MHz, 20 MHz; Nov 2010	5 MHz; Nov 2010; 1 MHz, GSM; Telenor: 5 MHz, GSM; Tele2: 9 MHz, GSM	10 MHz; Mar 2011	10 MHz	-	N/A	-	20 MHz (Cat.4) (Oct 2010); 30 MHz (CA_3A_20A) (Cat.6) (Jun 2016); 60 MHz (CA_3A_7A_7A) (Cat.9) (Aug 2016)	
Sweden	Telia	Apr 2017	19.8 MHz, UMTS	20 MHz, 15 MHz; Jan 2013	20 MHz; Dec 2009	10 MHz, GSM	10 MHz; Mar 2011	10 MHz, 5G NR	-	N/A	-	20 MHz (Cat.4) (Oct 2012); 40 MHz (CA_3A_7A) (Cat.6) (May 2016); World's first LTE network.	
Switzerland	Salt		15 MHz; Jul 2018; 4.8 MHz, UMTS	20 MHz; May 2013; 5 MHz, GSM ^{†}	20 MHz; Nov 2013	5 MHz, UMTS	10 MHz; May 2014	10 MHz, 5G NR	10 MHz; SDL (B75)	N/A	-	20 MHz (Cat.4) (Nov 2013); 40 MHz (CA_3A_7A) (Cat.6) (Dec 2014)^{†} only on legacy sites without UMTS to maintain CSFB capability.	
Switzerland	Sunrise	Jun 2017	10 MHz; Mar 2019	20 MHz; Jun 2013	20 MHz; Jun 2013 +5 MHz	10 MHz; Dec 2017; 5 MHz, UMTS	10 MHz; Jun 2013	5 MHz + 10 MHz SDL (B67)	15 MHz; SDL (B75)	N/A	-	20 MHz (Cat.4) (Nov 2013); 40 MHz (CA_3A_7A) (Cat.6) (Jan 2014)	
Switzerland	Swisscom	Jun 2015	20 MHz; 10 MHz; Sep 2015; 5G NR (DSS)	20 MHz; Nov 2012; 10 MHz; Dec 2017	20 MHz; Nov 2012	10 MHz; Aug 2020; 5 MHz, UMTS	10 MHz; Nov 2012	15 MHz; Aug 2020	50 MHz; SDL (B75)	45 MHz	-	4x4 MIMO (Dec 2017); 256 QAM (Dec 2017); 20 MHz (Cat.4) (Jun 2013); 40 MHz (CA_3A_7A) (Cat.6) (Jun 2014); 60 MHz (CA_1A_3A_7A) (Cat.9) (Sep 2015); 70 MHz (CA_1A_3A_7A_20A) [4x4 MIMO, 256 QAM] (Cat.16) (Dec 2017)	
Ukraine	Kyivstar	Dec 2020	20 MHz; Jul 2024	20 MHz; Jul 2018; 10 MHz, 5 MHz, GSM	15 MHz; Apr 2018	5 MHz; Jul 2020; 1.2 MHz, GSM	-	-	-	-	40 MHz; Jun 2022	4x4 MIMO (Apr 2018); 256 QAM (Apr 2018); 40 MHz (CA_3A_7A_8A) [4x4 MIMO, 256 QAM] (Cat.15) (Nov 2018) § NTN: 5 MHz (2025).	
Ukraine	Lifecell	Feb 2022	10 MHz; Mar 2022; 10 MHz, UMTS	15 MHz; Jul 2018	10 MHz; Mar 2018 +5 MHz	3 MHz; Nov 2020; 2 MHz, GSM	-	-	-	-	-	4x4 MIMO (Mar 2018); 256 QAM (Mar 2018)	
Ukraine	Vodafone	Jan 2025	20 MHz, UMTS	20 MHz; Jul 2018; 5 MHz, GSM	10 MHz; Mar 2018	3 MHz; Jul 2020; 2 MHz, GSM	-	-	-	35 MHz	-	45 MHz (CA_1A_3A_7A_8A) [4x4 MIMO] (Cat.15) (Sep 2021)	
United Kingdom	3	Sep 2015 (B20 only)	10 MHz; Aug 2017; 4.6 MHz, UMTS	15 MHz; Dec 2013	N/A	N/A	5 MHz; Sep 2015	10 MHz	20 MHz; Sep 2019	N/A	-	25 MHz (CA_1A_3A) (Cat.6) (Nov 2018)	
United Kingdom	EE	Nov 2016	20 MHz; Sep 2018	20 MHz, 10 MHz, 10 MHz; Oct 2012; 5 MHz, GSM	20 MHz, 15 MHz, 15 MHz; Oct 2014	N/A	5 MHz; Nov 2016	10 MHz, 5G NR +20 MHz; SDL (B67)	N/A	N/A	-	4x4 MIMO (Jun 2016); 256 QAM (Sep 2017); 2CA 64 QAM UL (Sep 2017); 20 MHz (Cat.4) (Jul 2013); 30 MHz (CA_3C) [4x4 MIMO] (Cat.9) (Jun 2016); 30 MHz (CA_3C) [4x4 MIMO, 256 QAM] (Cat.11) (Sep 2017); 40 MHz (CA_3A_7A) (Cat.6) (Oct 2014); 55 MHz (CA_3A_7C) (Cat.9) (Sep 2016); 85 MHz (CA_1A_3C_7C) [4x4 MIMO, 256 QAM] (Cat.19) (Sep 2018)	
United Kingdom	O_{2}	Mar 2017	10 MHz; Dec 2017; 5G NR (DSS)	5 MHz; Sep 2016	N/A	10 MHz; Sep 2021; 5 MHz, UMTS; 2.4 MHz, GSM	10 MHz; Aug 2013	10 MHz, 5G NR	N/A	25 MHz	20 MHz; Apr 2018; 20 MHz; Nov 2018	8x8 MIMO (Jun 2019) (?); 4x4 MIMO (Apr 2018); 15 MHz (CA_3A_20A) (Cat.4) (Sep 2016); 20 MHz [4x4 MIMO] (Cat.6) (Apr 2018); Infrastructure sharing with Vodafone.	
United Kingdom	Vodafone	Jul 2017	15 MHz; Apr 2016; 5G NR (DSS)	5 MHz; Jul 2016	20 MHz; Oct 2014	10 MHz; Sep 2021; 7.4 MHz, GSM	10 MHz; Aug 2013	N/A	20 MHz	20 MHz; Oct 2016 +5 MHz	-	64x64 MIMO (Jun 2017); 4x4 MIMO (Oct 2016); 256 QAM (Jun 2017); 20 MHz (Cat.4) (Oct 2014); 20 MHz (CA_1A_20A) (Cat.4) (Oct 2016); 30 MHz (CA_7A_20A) (Cat.6) (Oct 2014); 40 MHz (CA_1A_7A_20A) (Cat.9) (Jun 2017); 45 MHz (CA_1A_7A_20A) [4x4 MIMO, 256 QAM] (Cat.15) (Jun 2017); Infrastructure sharing with O_{2}. B3: available on limited sites only. B38: available on single sites in some city centres.	
Russia	See List of LTE networks in Asia.												
Turkey	See List of LTE networks in Asia.												

== Deployments in the 3400–3800 MHz range ==
Country	Operator	ƒ (MHz)	B	Launch date Cat.3 ≤ 100 Mbit/s	Launch date Cat.4 ≤ 150 Mbit/s	Launch date Cat.6 ≤ 300 Mbit/s	Notes
Ireland	Imagine Communications	3500; 3700	42; 43	? 2016			
Italy	GO Internet	3500	42	Sep 2015			
Italy	OpNet	3500	42	Dec 2014			
Italy	Fastweb	3500	42	Oct 2016 ?			20 MHz in use
Slovakia	Slovak Telecom	3700	43	Jul 2018			40 MHz in use FWB (Note: Fixed Wireless Broadband)
Slovakia	Slovanet	3500	43	Nov 2015			20 MHz in use FWB; 10 MHz remain unused
Slovakia	O2	3700	43	?			20 MHz in use FWB; 20 MHz remain unused
Slovakia	SWAN	3700	43	Apr 2016	Sep 2019		20 MHz in use FWB
United Kingdom	3 (UK Broadband)	3500	42	Feb 2012			20 MHz FWB (↓↑) 3480 – 3500 MHz

== Deployments at 410 MHz and 450 MHz ==
Country	Operator	ƒ (MHz)	B	VoLTE	Launch date Cat.3 ≤ 100 Mbit/s	Notes
Czech Republic	Nordic Telecom	410	87		Apr 2019	3 MHz
Denmark	Net 1 (Cibicom)	450	31		Jun 2015 ?	5 MHz
Åland Islands	Boldyn Networks (Edzcom)	450	31		Apr 2016	5 MHz; Network uses frequencies of Ålcom.
Finland	Boldyn Networks (Edzcom)	450	31		Nov 2014	5 MHz
Hungary	MVM Net	450	31		Apr 2016	for government use
Norway	Net 1 (ice.net)	450	31		Jun 2015	5 MHz
Sweden	Net 1	450	31		Jun 2015 ?	5 MHz

== Commercial deployments (old table format) ==
Country or territory	Operator	ƒ (MHz)	B	VoLTE	Launch date Cat.3 ≤ 100 Mbit/s	Launch date Cat.4 ≤ 150 Mbit/s	Launch date Cat.6 ≤ 300 Mbit/s	Launch date Cat.9 ≤ 450 Mbit/s	Launch date Cat.11 ≤ 600 Mbit/s	Notes
Europe	T-Mobile / Inmarsat	2100	65		Mar 2019					15 MHz; European Aviation Network; A2G In-Flight Connectivity Solution; MSS via S-Band
Bosnia and Herzegovina	BH Telecom	1800 ?	3 ?		Apr 2019					
Bosnia and Herzegovina	HT Eronet	?	?		May 2019					
Bosnia and Herzegovina	m:tel	?	?		Apr 2019					
Crimea (Ukraine)	Sevmobile; Sevtelecom	1800	3		May 2016					
Crimea (Ukraine)	Volna Mobile	2600	7		Jun 2016					
Crimea (Ukraine)	Win Mobile; K-Telecom	2600	7		Oct 2015					
Gibraltar	Gibtelecom	800	20		Feb 2016					
Gibraltar	Gibtelecom	2600	7		Feb 2016					
Greenland	Nanoq Media	2500	41		Dec 2013					
Greenland	Tusass A/S	800	20		Dec 2013					15 MHz
Greenland	Tuullik (GTV)	700	28		?					
Guernsey; Jersey	Airtel-Vodafone	800	20		Jul 2015					10 MHz
Guernsey; Jersey	Airtel-Vodafone	1800	3		Jul 2015					
Guernsey; Jersey	Jersey Telecom	800	20		Jun 2015; Feb 2015		Jun 2015; Feb 2015			10 MHz; CA of 30 MHz (CA_3A_20A).
Guernsey; Jersey	Jersey Telecom	1800	3		Jun 2015; Feb 2015		Jun 2015; Feb 2015			20 MHz; CA of 30 MHz (CA_3A_20A). CA of 40 MHz (CA_3A_7A).
Guernsey; Jersey	Jersey Telecom	2600	7		Jun 2015; Feb 2015		Jun 2015; Feb 2015			20 MHz; CA of 40 MHz (CA_3A_7A).
Guernsey; Jersey	Sure	800	20		? 2016		? 2016			10 MHz; CA of 30 MHz (CA_3A_20A).
Guernsey; Jersey	Sure	1800	3		May 2015		? 2016			20 MHz; CA of 30 MHz (CA_3A_20A).
Isle of Man	Manx Telecom	800	20		Jul 2014					10 MHz; CA of 30 MHz (CA_3A_20A).
Isle of Man	Manx Telecom	1800	3		Jul 2014					20 MHz; CA of 30 MHz (CA_3A_20A).
Isle of Man	Sure	800	20		Mar 2015					15 MHz
Isle of Man	Sure	1800	3		Mar 2015	?	?			40 MHz
Isle of Man	Sure	2100	1		?	?				20 MHz
Monaco	Monaco Telecom	800	20		Jan 2015	Oct 2015	Jan 2015	Oct 2015	May 2017 (Cat.16)	20 MHz; 4x4 MIMO, 256 QAM; CA of 30 MHz (CA_7A_20A). CA of 60 MHz (CA_3A_7A_20A).
Monaco	Monaco Telecom	1800	3		?	?	?	Oct 2015	May 2017 (Cat.16)	20 MHz; 4x4 MIMO, 256 QAM; CA of 30 MHz (CA_7A_20A). CA of 60 MHz (CA_3A_7A_20A).
Monaco	Monaco Telecom	2600	7		Oct 2013	Jan 2015	Jan 2015	Oct 2015	May 2017 (Cat.16)	20 MHz; 4x4 MIMO, 256 QAM; CA of 30 MHz (CA_7A_20A). CA of 60 MHz (CA_3A_7A_20A).
Northern Cyprus	KKTCell	?	?		Sep 2023					
Transnistria	Interdnestrcom	800	20	Dec 2017	Apr 2012					10 MHz; Available in Transnistria and Bender.

== See also ==
- LTE
- LTE frequency bands
- List of LTE networks
- List of UMTS networks
- List of HSPA+ networks
- List of CDMA2000 networks
- UMTS frequency bands
- List of mobile network operators of Europe
- Mobile Network Codes in ITU region 2xx (Europe)
