= Eurosender =

European digital services company

- Industry: Logistics
- Founded: 2014; 11 years ago
- Founders: Tim Potočnik and Jan Štefe
- Headquarters: Slovenia and United Kingdom
- Area served: Europe
- Website: www.eurosender.com

Eurosender is an online platform for booking door-to-door logistics services in Europe. It provides postal, courier and freight forwarding services. The company was founded in 2014 by Slovenian entrepreneurs Tim Potočnik and Jan Štefe.

== Services ==
Eurosender developed a system that automatically calculates final prices for every individual shipping route. They act as a bulk buyer that aggregates demand from businesses and end-consumers and are able to negotiate lower prices with the logistics service providers. Since its start, Eurosender has partnered with many major European couriers, including DHL, DPD, GLS and Kuehne, and Nagel.

The company increased revenue by 200 percent in 2017.

== Partnerships ==
In May 2016, German multinational insurance group ERGO Group invested 300,000 EUR in Eurosender while becoming an integrated provider of package insurance for deliveries processed through the platform.

In September 2017, Eurosender announced a partnership with Parcelly, a London-based service for collecting parcels.

In December, the company partnered with Post Luxembourg, a Luxembourgish telecom and postal provider.
