= Novatium =

Informational technology company of India

Novatium Solutions (P) Ltd
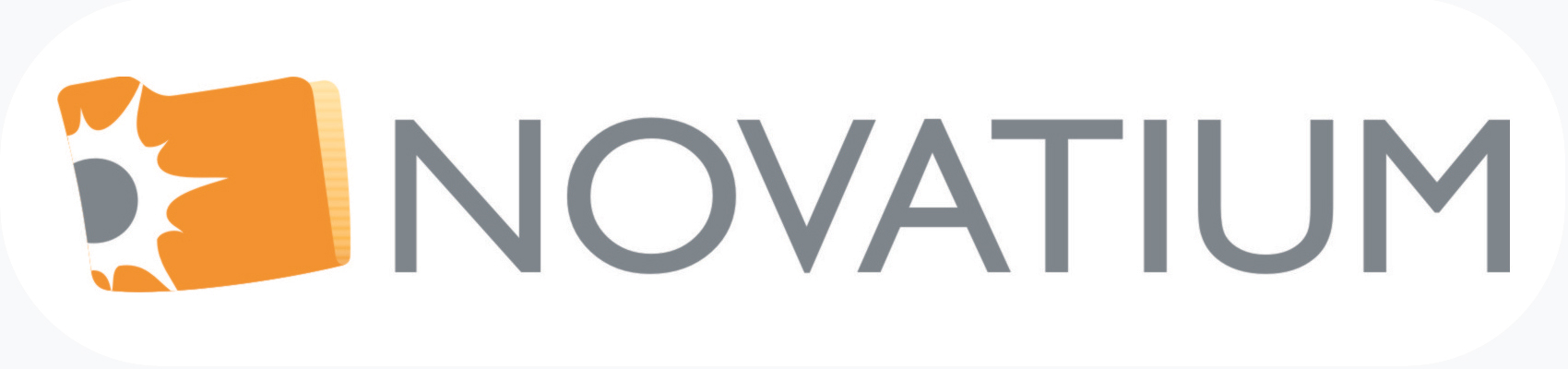
- Type: Private
- Industry: Utility computing services
- Founded: 2004
- Headquarters: Chennai, India
- Key people: Rajesh Jain, MD, Netcore Solutions; Ray Sata, Chairman, Analog Devices Inc. Dr. Ashok Jhunjhunwala, IIT Madras; Alok Singh, CEO; Shirish B Purohit; Krishna "kittu" Kolluri; Ben Mathias
- Number of employees: 100+

Novatium Solutions Pvt Ltd is a privately held Indian company based in Chennai, India which provides computing services and what it calls managed utility computing services. Its chief executive officer is Alok Singh. The company was founded by Rajesh Jain in 2004.

== History ==
Novatium began operations in 2004, and has developed thin embedded devices capable of operating on Windows, Linux, Macintosh, Android and Solaris platform without any change in device. The company has partnered with Tata Teleservices Limited to launch Novatium Navigator with Tata Photon plus. Thus, Novatium is India's first cloud computing on wireless broadband service. The services include high speed computing experience with an emphasis on internet, gaming, digital entertainment, online education, telephony and business productivity. Bharti Airtel, an Asian integrated telecom service provider, also entered into a strategic partnership with Novatium to help expand the broadband market in India.

== Products ==
Novatium provides computing devices and has four products, Novatium Navigator, Novatium Navigator +, Novatium Neon, Novatium cNergy. Novatium has arranged with Bharat Sanchar Nigam Limited, Mahanagar Telephone Nigam Limited, Bharti Airtel and Tata Teleservices to connect the device into the Novatium Desktop.

Novatium also manufactured and purveyed the Nova NetPC circa 2007, which was priced at $100 at that time and was described as being "just within reach of India's growing middle class". The Nova NetPC involved users subscribing to a computing service, and the computer had no hard drive disks.

== See also ==
- Netcore Cloud
- IYogi
