= Ålcom =

Telecommunication company in the Åland Islands

- Founded: 1989
- Headquarters: Mariehamn, Finland
- Area served: Åland
- Key people: Tom Bengtsson (CEO and CFO)
- Number of employees: 30
- Website: www.alcom.ax

Ålcom is a local provider of 3G UMTS, 4G LTE and 5G mobile; fixed telephony, broadband, ISP services and IPTV in the autonomous Finnish region of Åland. Ålcom mobile subscribers also have full access to Elisa's mobile network when on domestic roaming in mainland Finland. Ålcom is also a full member of the Finnet (fi) group of telephone cooperatives.

In 2016, Ålcom partnered with Ukko Mobile to extend Ukko Mobile's LTE 450MHz coverage also in Åland. At the same time, Ålcom took a minority stake in Ukko Mobile.

== See also ==
- List of mobile network operators in Europe
