= Post Luxembourg =

Post and telecommunications company in Luxembourg

POST Luxembourg
- Type: Government-owned corporation
- Industry: Communications
- Founded: 20 August 1842 (original); 10 August 1992 (corporatisation)
- Headquarters: 20, rue de Reims, Luxembourg City, Luxembourg
- Area served: Luxembourg
- Key people: Claude Strasser, Director-General
- Services: Mail, telecommunications, financial services
- Revenue: ▲€862.0m (2019)
- Operating income: ▲€183.0m (2019)
- Net income: ▲€38.0m (2019)
- Website: post.lu

POST Luxembourg, formerly known as Entreprise des Postes et Télécommunications (French pronunciation: [ɑ̃tʁəpʁiz de pɔst e telekɔmynikasjɔ̃], "Postal and Telecommunications Company"; Luxembourgish: Lëtzebuerger Post), is a mail and telecommunications company based in Luxembourg.

== History ==
The company is a government-owned corporation, which originated from Luxembourg's state-owned PTT agency founded in 1842 as "Administration des Postes". They issued their first postage stamp in 1852, and became founding members of the Universal Postal Union in 1874.

The first vehicle used for postal delivery went into operation in 1910. An airmail service was introduced in 1928. During the German occupation of Luxembourg during World War II, Luxembourg's postal service was abolished and integrated into Germany's Reichspost.

The service was subsequently corporatised with the founding of P&T Luxembourg in 1992. It also sells financial services and holds a monopoly on issuing postage stamps in the Grand Duchy.

It comes under the remit of the Minister for Communications, who reports to the Prime Minister in the latter's capacity as Minister of State.

P&T owns shares in sixteen other companies, including controlling stakes in eBRC data centres (100%), Editus.lu (100%), Eltrona, HotCity, Infomail (45%), Intech, Michel Greco (60%), Netcore (100%), POST Telecom (100%), POST PSF Consulting (100%), Victor Buck Services (Majority), Visual Online (51%).

On September 30, 2013, P&TLuxembourg and LuxGSM merged into a single brand, POST Luxembourg. The LUXGSM network was therefore renamed POST.
