= List of LTE networks in Asia =

This is a list of commercial Long-Term Evolution (LTE) networks in Asia, grouped by their frequency bands.

Some operators use multiple bands and are therefore listed multiple times in respective sections.

== General information ==
- For technical details on LTE and a list of its designated operating frequencies, bands, and roaming possibilities, see LTE frequency bands.

Legend:	in use	partially in use	not in use	in use for 5G NR only

Note: This list of network deployments does not imply any widespread deployment or national coverage.

== Commercial deployments ==
Country or Territory	Operator	VoLTE	B1 2100 MHz	B3 1800 MHz	B5 850 MHz	B7 2600 MHz	B8 900 MHz	B20 800 MHz	B28 700 MHz	B31 450 MHz	B40 2300 MHz	B41 2500 MHz	CA (Note: Carrier Aggregation) schemes	References & Notes
Afghanistan	AWCC		10 MHz, UMTS	10 MHz; May 2017	N/A	-	6,8 MHz, GSM	-	-	-	-	-		
Afghanistan	Etisalat		10 MHz, UMTS	10 MHz; Feb 2019	N/A	-	6,8 MHz, GSM	-	-	-	-	-		
Afghanistan	Afghan Telecom (Salaam)		10 MHz, UMTS	10 MHz; Apr 2020	N/A	-	6,8 MHz, GSM	-	-	-	-	-		
Armenia	VEON (Beeline)		15 MHz, UMTS	20 MHz; Sep 2016	N/A	-	(?)	-	-	5 MHz; May 2016	-	-	25 MHz (CA_3A_20A) (Cat.6) (Apr 2020); 450 MHz: FWB (Note: Fixed Wireless Broadband)	
Armenia	U!com	Dec 2017	15 MHz, UMTS	20 MHz; Sep 2016	N/A	10 MHz; Sep 2016	10 MHz, GSM	10 MHz; Sep 2016	-	N/A	-	-	20 MHz (Cat.4) (Sep 2016); 30 MHz (CA_3A_20A) (Cat.6) (Sep 2016)	
Armenia	MTS	Oct 2023	15 MHz, UMTS	2,6 MHz, GSM	N/A	20 MHz; Dec 2011	(?)	-	-	N/A	-	-	20 MHz (Cat.4) (Dec 2014)	
Azerbaijan	Azercell		(?)	15 MHz; Jun 2012; 2,4 MHz, GSM	(?)	-	8,2 MHz, GSM	-	-	-	-	-		
Azerbaijan	Azerfon (Nar Mobile)		(?)	15 MHz; Apr 2015; 2,4 MHz, GSM	(?)	-	8 MHz, GSM	-	-	-	-	-	4x4 MIMO (Nov 2017)	
Azerbaijan	Bakcell	May 2022	(?)	15 MHz; May 2015; 2,4 MHz, GSM	(?)	-	8 MHz, GSM	-	-	-	-	-	4x4 MIMO (Nov 2017)	
Azerbaijan	Baktelecom		-	-	-	-	-	-	-	-	? MHz; Mar 2018	-	FWB	
Bahrain	Batelco	Jun 2017	15 MHz, 5 MHz, UMTS	20 MHz; Feb 2013; 5 MHz, GSM	N/A	N/A	11,8 MHz, GSM	10 MHz	-	-	-	50 MHz, 5G NR	20 MHz (Cat.4) (Sep 2013)	
Bahrain	stc	Oct 2017	15 MHz, 5 MHz, UMTS	20 MHz; Jan 2014; 5 MHz, GSM	N/A	N/A	5,6 MHz, 5,6 MHz, GSM	10 MHz; Jul 2017	-	-	-	40 MHz, 5G NR	20 MHz (Cat.4) (May 2016); 30 MHz (CA_3A_20A) (Cat.6) (Jul 2017)	
Bahrain	Zain	Dec 2019	15 MHz, 5 MHz, UMTS	20 MHz; Apr 2013; 5 MHz, GSM	N/A	N/A	7,6 MHz, 4,4 MHz, GSM	10 MHz	-	-	-	50 MHz, 5G NR		
Bangladesh	Banglalink		5 MHz; Feb 2018; 5 MHz, UMTS	15 MHz; Feb 2018; 0,6 MHz, GSM	N/A	-	5 MHz, GSM	-	-	-	40 MHz; Sep 2022	-		
Bangladesh	Banglalion		-	-	N/A	-	-	-	-	-	-	20 MHz; Nov 2015; B38 +15 MHz		
Bangladesh	Grameenphone		10 MHz, UMTS	10 MHz; Feb 2018; 9,6 MHz, GSM	N/A	-	7,4 MHz, GSM	-	-	-	-	-		
Bangladesh	Ollo (BIEL)		-	-	N/A	20 MHz; Dec 2015 - May 2019	-	10 MHz; Dec 2015 - May 2019	-	-	-	-		
Bangladesh	Qubee		-	-	N/A	-	-	-	-	-	20 MHz; Jul 2018 +15 MHz	-		
Bangladesh	Robi Airtel		5 MHz; Apr 2021; 5 MHz, UMTS	15 MHz; Feb 2018; 2,4 MHz, GSM	N/A	-	5 MHz; Feb 2018; 2,4 MHz, GSM	-	-	-	-	60 MHz; Oct 2023	20 MHz (CA_3A_8A) (Cat.4) (Apr 2018)	
Bangladesh	Teletalk		10 MHz, UMTS	10 MHz; Dec 2018	N/A	-	5,2 MHz, GSM	-	-	-	-	-		
Cambodia	CamGSM (Cellcard)		15 MHz, UMTS	15 MHz; Nov 2015	N/A	-	9,3 MHz, GSM	-	-	-	-	-		
Cambodia	Kingtel		-	-	N/A	-	-	-	-	-	-	15 MHz; Sep 2015		
Cambodia	Viettel (Metfone)		10 MHz, UMTS	10 MHz, 5 MHz; May 2018	N/A	-	8 MHz, 6,8 MHz, GSM	-	-	-	-	-	15 MHz (CA_3A_3A) (Cat.4) (May 2018)	
Cambodia	SEATEL	Jul 2015	-	-	5 MHz; Jul 2015	-	-	-	-	-	-	-		
Cambodia	Smart Axiata		10 MHz; Sep 2016; 10 MHz, UMTS	20 MHz; Jan 2014; 5 MHz, GSM	N/A	-	9,3 MHz, GSM	-	-	-	-	-	4x4 MIMO (Aug 2017); 256 QAM (Aug 2017); 20 MHz (Cat.4) (Jan 2014); 30 MHz (CA_1A_3A) (Cat.6) (Sep 2016); 30 MHz (CA_1A_3A) [4x4 MIMO, 256 QAM] (Cat.11) (Aug 2017)	
China	China Mobile	Aug 2015	B34; 2000 MHz; 15 MHz; Nov 2016 B39; 1900 MHz; 30 MHz; Dec 2013 +5 MHz +5 MHz	20 MHz; Apr 2018 5 MHz, GSM	N/A	N/A	10 MHz; Aug 2018 1 MHz; NB-IoT; Jun 2017 4 MHz, GSM	-	30 MHz; 5G NR	-	50 MHz; Dec 2013	60 MHz; Dec 2013 +100 MHz; 5G NR +15 MHz +15 MHz	B39: 5 MHz GB to B1 and B3; NB-IoT [B8] (Jun 2017); 8x8 MIMO (Nov 2016); 20 MHz (Cat.4) (Dec 2013); 40 MHz (CA_41C) (Cat.6) (Dec 2014); 60 MHz (CA_41C_41A) (Cat.9) (Mar 2015); 20 MHz [8x8 MIMO] (Cat.18) (Nov 2016); 20 MHz [8x8 MIMO, 256 QAM] (Cat.18) (Sep 2017) (Demo)	
China	China Telecom	Jan 2019	20 MHz; Mar 2015 DSS; 5G NR; Nov 2025	20 MHz; Mar 2015	10 MHz; Jul 2016 DSS; 5G NR; Sep 2023	N/A	N/A	-	-	-	20 MHz; Feb 2014	20 MHz; Feb 2014 - Dec 2018	NB-IoT [B5] (Jun 2017); 20 MHz (Cat.4) (Mar 2015); 40 MHz (CA_3A_41A) (Cat.7) (Sep 2014); 40 MHz (CA_1A_3A) (Cat.6) (Aug 2016); 50 MHz (CA_1A_3A_5A) (Cat.9) (Jul 2017)	
China	China Unicom	Mar 2016	20 MHz; Dec 2020 DSS; 5G NR; Nov 2022 5 MHz, UMTS	20 MHz, 10 MHz; Mar 2015	N/A	N/A	10 MHz; Jun 2017 DSS; 5G NR; Nov 2022	-	-	-	20 MHz; Mar 2014	20 MHz; Mar 2014 - Dec 2018	NB-IoT [B3,B8] (Jun 2017); 4x4 MIMO, 256 QAM (Aug 2017); 20 MHz (Cat.4) (Mar 2014); 30 MHz (CA_3A_41A) (Cat.6) (Aug 2014) (Trial); 40 MHz (CA_3A_40A) (Cat.6) (Dec 2015); 50 MHz (CA_3C_40A) (Cat.9) (Dec 2015); 50 MHz (CA_3C_40A) [4x4 MIMO, 256 QAM] (Cat.15) (Aug 2017); B1: 5 MHz W-CDMA carrier retained for 4G devices without VoLTE capability.	
Georgia	MagtiCom	May 2018	15 MHz, UMTS	20 MHz, 10 MHz; Feb 2015	N/A	-	13,2 MHz, GSM	5 MHz; Jun 2016	-	-	-	-	20 MHz (Cat.4) (Feb 2015); 25 MHz (CA_3A_20A) (Cat.6) (Jun 2016); 30 MHz (CA_3C) [4x4 MIMO] (Cat.9) (Sep 2018)	
Georgia	Mobitel (Beeline)		10 MHz, UMTS	10 MHz, GSM	N/A	-	5,5 MHz, GSM	10 MHz; Feb 2015	-	-	-	-		
Georgia	Silknet (Geocell)		15 MHz, UMTS	20 MHz, 10 MHz; Mar 2015	N/A	-	11,8 MHz, GSM	-	-	-	40 MHz; 10 MHz; Dec 2014	-	4x4 MIMO (Sep 2018); 30 MHz (CA_3C) [4x4 MIMO] (Cat.9) (Sep 2018); 70 MHz (CA_3A_40D) [4x4 MIMO] (Cat.16) (Nov 2020)	
Hong Kong (SAR)	3	May 2014	15 MHz; Mar 2018	10 MHz; May 2012 +5 MHz	N/A	15 MHz; May 2012	5 MHz; Jun 2016; 5 MHz, UMTS	-	10 MHz	-	20 MHz, 10 MHz; Oct 2016	-	2600 MHz: 20 MHz shared with csl. 75 MHz (CA_1A_3A_7A_8A_40A) (Cat.15) (Mar 2018)	
Hong Kong (SAR)	China Mobile	Sep 2015	10 MHz	10 MHz, 10 MHz (?) 2013	N/A	20 MHz; Apr 2012	5 MHz, GSM	-	10 MHz	-	20 MHz, 10 MHz; Dec 2012	-	45 MHz (CA_7A_40C) (Demo); 30 MHz (CA_40C) [8x8 MIMO, 256 QAM] (Demo)	
Hong Kong (SAR)	csl (Genius)	May 2014	15 MHz, UMTS	20 MHz; Aug 2012	N/A	20 MHz; May 2011; 20 MHz; May 2012	5 MHz, UMTS; 5 MHz, GSM	-	10 MHz	-	-	-	256 QAM (May 2017); 20 MHz (Cat.4) (May/Jun 2013); 40 MHz (CA_3A_7A) (Cat.6) (Dec 2014); 60 MHz (CA_3A_7A_7A) (Cat.9) (Jan 2015); 60 MHz (CA_3A_7A_7A) [256 QAM] (Cat.11) (May 2017); 2600 MHz: One 20 MHz spectrum block shared with 3.	
Hong Kong (SAR)	SmarTone	May 2014	15 MHz; Aug 2018; 5 MHz, UMTS	10 MHz, 10 MHz; Jan 2013	10 MHz, UMTS +2.5 MHz	10 MHz; Sep 2015	5 MHz; Aug 2012	-	5 MHz	-	-	-	4x4 MIMO (Dec 2016); 256 QAM (Dec 2016); 15 MHz (CA_3A_8A) (Cat.4) (Jul 2014); 20 MHz (CA_3A_7A) (Cat.4) (Jul 2014); 35 MHz (CA_3A_7A_8A) (Cat.9) (Jan 2016); 40 MHz (CA_1A_3A_7A_8A) [4x4 MIMO, 256 QAM] (Cat.15) (Dec 2016); 55 MHz (CA_3A_7A_8A_255A) (Cat.16) (Aug 2018)	
India	Airtel	Sep 2017	5-10 MHz; May 2019	5-20 MHz; Jan 2016 GSM	5 MHz; July 2021 (4 circles)	N/A	5 MHz; Jan 2019 GSM	N/A	-	-	30-40 MHz; Apr 2012	-	20 MHz (Cat.4) (Sep 2016); 25 MHz (CA_3A_40A) (Cat.6) (Sep 2016)	
India	BSNL Mobile		5 MHz; Apr 2019 UMTS	-	-	N/A	5-6.2 MHz; GSM	N/A	-	-	-	-		
India	Jio	Jun 2016	-	10 MHz; Jun 2016	5-15 MHz; Jun 2016	N/A	-	N/A	-	-	40 MHz; Jun 2016	-	Spectrum Sharing with RCOM in 5 circles. Available to RCOM customers.	
India	Vi	Feb 2018	5-10 MHz; Oct 2016 UMTS	10 MHz; Dec 2015 GSM	N/A	N/A	3 MHz; Mar 2020 GSM	-	-	-	10 MHz; Nov 2017 (3 circles)	10-30 MHz; Jan 2019		
Indonesia	3		15 MHz, UMTS	5 MHz; Jul 2015; 5 MHz, GSM	N/A	-	N/A	-	-	N/A	-	-		
Indonesia	hinet		N/A	N/A	N/A	-	N/A	-	-	N/A	20 MHz; Nov 2016 - Nov 2022 +10 MHz	-		License revoked on 15 Nov 2022.
Indonesia	Indosat		15 MHz, UMTS	20 MHz; Jul 2015	N/A	-	5 MHz; Dec 2014; 5 MHz, UMTS; 2,5 MHz, GSM	-	-	N/A	-	-	20 MHz (Cat.4) (Dec 2015); 25 MHz (CA_3A_8A) (Cat.6) (Dec 2015)	
Indonesia	Net1		N/A	N/A	N/A	-	N/A	-	-	5 MHz; Jan 2018 - Nov 2021	-	-		License revoked on 30 Nov 2021.
Indonesia	Smartfren	Jul 2016	N/A	N/A	15 MHz; Aug 2015	-	N/A	-	-	N/A	20 MHz; Jul 2015 +10 MHz	-	20 MHz (Cat.4) (Aug 2015); 30 MHz (CA_5A_40A) (Cat.6) (Aug 2015)	
Indonesia	Telkomsel	Jun 2020	15 MHz, UMTS	20 MHz; Dec 2016; 2,5 MHz, GSM	N/A	-	5 MHz; Dec 2014; 5 MHz, UMTS; 2,5 MHz, 2,5 MHz, GSM	-	-	N/A	20 MHz; Dec 2017 +10 MHz	-	4x4 MIMO (Dec 2016); 256 QAM (Dec 2016); 20 MHz (Cat.4) (Dec 2016); 20 MHz [4x4 MIMO, 256 QAM] (Cat.11) (Dec 2016)	
Indonesia	XL		15 MHz, UMTS	20 MHz; Jul 2015; 2,5 MHz, GSM	N/A	-	5 MHz; Dec 2014; 2,5 MHz, GSM	-	-	N/A	-	-	20 MHz (Cat.4) (Nov 2015); 20 MHz [4x4 MIMO] (Cat.6) (in deployment)	
Israel	Cellcom		10 MHz, UMTS	10 MHz; Aug 2014; 10 MHz, GSM	10 MHz, UMTS	20 MHz	-	-	10 MHz	-	-	-		
Israel	Partner		10 MHz, UMTS	20 MHz; Jul 2014	N/A	20 MHz	10 MHz, UMTS; 8 MHz, GSM	-	10 MHz	-	-	-		
Israel	Pelephone		10 MHz, UMTS	15 MHz; Aug 2014; 5 MHz, GSM	N/A	20 MHz	-	-	10 MHz	-	-	-		
Israel	Xfone (We4G)		10 MHz, UMTS	5 MHz; Apr 2018	N/A	-	-	-	-	-	-	-		
Japan	KDDI (au)	Dec 2014	20 MHz; Sep 2012	20 MHz	15 MHz; Sep 2012; B18; 850 MHz	10 MHz; B11; 1500 MHz	N/A	40 MHz; B42; 3500 MHz	10 MHz; Oct 2015	-	-	40 MHz; Oct 2013	4x4 MIMO (Sep 2017); 256 QAM (Sep 2017); 20 MHz (CA_1A_18A) (Cat.4) (May 2014); 30 MHz (CA_1A_18A) (Cat.6) (Apr 2015); 40 MHz (CA_1A_18A_28A) (Cat.9) (Oct 2015); 60 MHz (CA_1A_41C) (Cat.9) (May 2016); 40 MHz (CA_41C) [4x4 MIMO, 256 QAM] (Cat.15) (Sep 2017); B18: Access for B26 devices via MFBI (Note: Multi-Frequency Band Indicator)	
Japan	NTT DoCoMo	Jun 2014	15 MHz; Dec 2010; 5 MHz, UMTS	20 MHz; Sep 2013	15 MHz; Nov 2012; B19; 850 MHz	15 MHz; Nov 2012; B21; 1500 MHz	N/A	40 MHz; Jun 2016; B42; 3500 MHz +40 MHz	10 MHz; Jan 2015	-	-	-	4x4 MIMO (Mar 2017); 256 QAM (Mar 2017); 64 QAM UL (May 2018); 64 QAM 2CA UL (2019); 20 MHz (CA_1A_19A) (15+5) (Cat.4) (Sep 2013); 25 MHz (CA_1A_19A) (15+10) (Cat.6) (Sep 2015); 30 MHz (CA_1A_21A) (15+15) (CA_3A_19A) (20+10) (Cat.6) (Mar 2015); 35 MHz (CA_1A_3A) (15+20) (Cat.6) (Sep 2015); 40 MHz (CA_1A_19A_21A) (15+10+15) (Cat.9) (Sep 2015); 50 MHz (CA_1A_3A_19A) (15+20+15) (Cat.9) (Mar 2016); 55 MHz (CA_1A_42C) (15+40) (Cat.9) (Jun 2016); 60 MHz (CA_3A_42C) (20+40) (Cat.9) (Jun 2016); 75 MHz (CA_1A_3A_42C) (15+20+40) [256 QAM] (Cat.15) (Oct 2017); 70 MHz (CA_1A_19A_42C) (CA_1A_21A_42C) (15+15+40) [256 QAM] (Cat.15) (Oct 2017); 60 MHz (CA_3A_42C) (20+40) [4x4 MIMO, 256 QAM] (Cat.18) (May 2018); 75 MHz (CA_1A_3A_42C) (15+20+40) [4x4 MIMO, 256 QAM] (Cat.16) (May 2018); 90 MHz (CA_1A_3A_19A_42C) (15+20+15+40) (Cat.16) (May 2018); 90 MHz (CA_1A_3A_19A_42C) (15+20+15+40) [4x4 MIMO, 256 QAM] (Cat.18) (2019)	
Japan	Rakuten Mobile		N/A	20 MHz; Apr 2020	N/A	N/A	N/A	N/A	3 MHz; Oct 2023				4x4 MIMO (Apr 2020); 256 QAM (Apr 2020); 20 MHz [4x4 MIMO, 256 QAM] (Cat.11) (Apr 2020)	
Japan	SoftBank	Dec 2014	20 MHz; Sep 2012	15 MHz; Mar 2012	N/A	10 MHz; Apr 2017; B11; 1500 MHz	15 MHz; Jul 2014	40 MHz; May 2018; B42; 3500 MHz +40 MHz	10 MHz	-	-	20 MHz, 10 MHz; Feb 2012; AXGP (WCP)	4x4 MIMO (May 2018); 256 QAM (Oct 2016); 30 MHz (CA_41C) (Cat.6) (Sep 2014); 25 MHz (CA_1A_8A) (Cat.6) (Aug 2015); 35 MHz (CA_1A_3A_8A) (Cat.9) (Sep 2015); 35 MHz (CA_1A_3A_8A) [256 QAM] (Cat.11) (Oct 2016); 75 MHz (CA_3A_41A_42C) [4x4 MIMO, 256 QAM] (Cat.18) (May 2018); 40 MHz (CA_42C) [4x4 MIMO, 256 QAM] (Cat.15) (Demo); 80 MHz (CA_42C_42C) [4x4 MIMO, 256 QAM] (Cat.19) (Demo)	
Jordan	Orange		10 MHz, 5 MHz, UMTS	10 MHz; May 2015	N/A	10 MHz; Jan 2018	12,5 MHz, GSM	-	-	-	-	-	256 QAM (Jan 2018); 20 MHz (CA_3A_7A) (Cat.4) (Jan 2018); 20 MHz (CA_3A_7A) [256 QAM] (Cat.11) (Jan 2018)	
Jordan	Umniah		10 MHz, UMTS	10 MHz; Mar 2016; 10 MHz, GSM	N/A	-	-	-	-	-	-	-		
Jordan	Zain		20 MHz, UMTS	20 MHz; Feb 2015	N/A	-	12,5 MHz, 5 MHz, GSM	-	-	-	-	-	20 MHz (Cat.4) (Feb 2015)	
Kuwait	stc	Jun 2015	15 MHz, UMTS	10 MHz; Dec 2011; 4,6 MHz, GSM	N/A	-	10,2 MHz, GSM	-	-	-	-	-		
Kuwait	Ooredoo	Aug 2017	15 MHz, UMTS	15 MHz; Jul 2013; 4,2 MHz, GSM	N/A	-	10,2 MHz, GSM	10 MHz; Jun 2015	-	-	-	-	25 MHz (CA_3A_20A) (Cat.6) (Jun 2015)	
Kuwait	Zain	Jul 2016	15 MHz, UMTS	10 MHz; Nov 2012; 4,2 MHz, GSM	N/A	-	13,8 MHz, GSM	-	-	-	-	-		
Kyrgyzstan	Beeline (Sky Mobile)		(?)	(?)	-	-	(?)	10 MHz; May 2016	-	-	40 MHz (Bishkek)	-		
Kyrgyzstan	MEGA	Apr 2023	10 MHz; Mar 2016; 10 MHz, UMTS	10 MHz; Mar 2016 (?) MHz, GSM	-	-	5 MHz, UMTS (?) MHz, GSM	10 MHz; Mar 2016	-	-	40 MHz; 20 MHz	-	20 MHz (CA_1A_3A) (Cat.4) (Dec 2016)	
Kyrgyzstan	Nur (O!)		(?)	(?)	-	20 MHz; May 2014	5 MHz, UMTS (?) MHz, GSM	10 MHz; Mar 2016	-	-	-	-	20 MHz (Cat.4) (May 2014)	
Kyrgyzstan	Saima		(?)	(?)	-	(?) MHz; Dec 2011	(?)	N/A	-	-	-	-	FWB	
Laos	Laotel (LTC)		15 MHz, UMTS	20 MHz, 10 MHz; Apr 2015	-	-	6 MHz, 2 MHz, GSM	-	-	-	-	-	30 MHz (CA_3C) (Cat.6) (Jan 2018)	
Laos	Unitel		10 MHz, 5 MHz, UMTS	15 MHz; Jun 2015	-	-	5,8 MHz, 2 MHz, GSM	-	-	-	-	-		
Lebanon	Alfa	Sep 2018	10 MHz, UMTS	15 MHz; May 2013	-	-	12,5 MHz, GSM	15 MHz; Aug 2016	-	-	-	-	30 MHz (CA_3A_20A) (Cat.6) (Aug 2016)	
Lebanon	touch	Apr 2026	10 MHz, UMTS	15 MHz; May 2013	-	-	12,5 MHz, GSM	15 MHz; Sep 2016	-	-	-	-		
Macau (SAR)	3	Aug 2017	5 MHz	10 MHz; Dec 2015	-	-	5 MHz	-	-	-	-	-		
Macau (SAR)	China Telecom		15 MHz +5 MHz	20 MHz; Nov 2015; 10 MHz	5 MHz	5 MHz	-	-	20 MHz, 5G NR	-	-	-		
Macau (SAR)	CTM	Apr 2017	20 MHz; 5 MHz	20 MHz; Oct 2015 +5 MHz	-	-	10 MHz	-	20 MHz, 5G NR	-	~~20 MHz~~; Oct 2015- Nov 2020	-		
Malaysia	Altel		N/A	N/A	N/A	20 MHz; Apr 2014	5 MHz	-	5 MHz	-	-	-		
Malaysia	Celcom		15 MHz ?	20 MHz; Jun 2013	N/A	20 MHz; Apr 2013 +10 MHz	10 MHz, GSM	-	10 MHz	-	30 MHz	-	2600 MHz: Frequency sharing with Altel.	
Malaysia	Digi	Oct 2016	15 MHz ?	10 MHz; Oct 2015; 10 MHz, GSM	N/A	10 MHz; Jul 2013	5 MHz; Jul 2017	-	10 MHz	-	-	-	20 MHz (CA_3A_7A) (Cat.4) (Nov 2015)	
Malaysia	Maxis		15 MHz ?	20 MHz; Apr 2013	N/A	20 MHz; Jul 2013	10 MHz, GSM	-	10 MHz	-	-	-	20 MHz (Cat.4) (Nov 2015); 30 MHz (CA_3A_7A) (Cat.6) (Nov 2015); 2600 MHz: Frequency sharing with REDTone.	
Malaysia	Telekom Malaysia (UniFi)		N/A	N/A	10 MHz; Aug 2014	N/A	N/A	-	5 MHz	-	20 MHz; Dec 2016 +10 MHz	20 MHz	20 MHz (Cat.4) (Dec 2016); 30 MHz (CA_40C) (Cat.6) ((?) 2017); 30 MHz (CA_5A_40C) (Cat.6) ((?) 2017); FWB	
Malaysia	U Mobile	May 2017	15 MHz ?	15 MHz; Aug 2016	N/A	10 MHz; Dec 2013	5 MHz	-	-	-	-	-	25 MHz (CA_3A_7A) (Cat.6) (Aug 2016)	
Malaysia	Yes 4G	Jun 2016	N/A	N/A	N/A	N/A	N/A	-	-	-	10 MHz; Jun 2016 +20 MHz	20 MHz; Jun 2016; B38		
Mongolia	G-Mobile		10 MHz, UMTS	10 MHz; Dec 2017	-	-	-	-	-	4.5 MHz, CDMA	-	-		
Mongolia	MobiCom		10 MHz, 10 MHz, UMTS	20 MHz; May 2016	-	-	12,5 MHz, GSM	-	10 MHz; Nov 2017	-	-	-	30 MHz (CA_3A_28A) (Cat.6) (Nov 2017)	
Mongolia	Skytel		10 MHz, UMTS	10 MHz; Jun 2018	7 MHz, 10 MHz, CDMA	-	-	-	-	-	-	-		
Mongolia	Unitel		15 MHz, UMTS	20 MHz; Apr 2016; 5 MHz, GSM	-	-	12,2 MHz, GSM	-	10 MHz; Nov 2016	-	40 MHz; Jan 2017	-		
Myanmar	ACS		N/A	N/A	N/A	-	N/A	-	-	-	-	20 MHz; May 2018; B38		
Myanmar	MPT		5 MHz; Oct 2016; 10 MHz, UMTS	20 MHz; May 2017	10 MHz, CDMA; 2000	-	10 MHz, GSM	-	-	3,8 MHz, CDMA; 2000	-	-	4x4 MIMO (Dec 2017); 20 MHz (Cat.4) (Jun 2017); 20 MHz [4x4 MIMO] (Cat.6) (Jun 2017); 30 MHz (CA_1A_3A_8A) [4x4 MIMO] (Cat.9) (Demo)	
Myanmar	Mytel	Oct 2018	15 MHz; Mar 2018	15 MHz	N/A	-	5 MHz; Mar 2018 +2.5 MHz	-	-	N/A	-	-		
Myanmar	Ooredoo	Sep 2018	10 MHz; May 2016; 5 MHz, UMTS	10 MHz; Jun 2017 +10 MHz	N/A	-	5 MHz, UMTS; 2.5 MHz, GSM	-	-	N/A	-	-	4x4 MIMO (Feb 2018); 256 QAM (Feb 2018); LTE-LAA (Feb 2018); 20 MHz (CA_1A_3A) [4x4 MIMO, 256 QAM] (Cat.6) (Feb 2018); 50 MHz (CA_1A_255C) [4x4 MIMO, 256 QAM] (Cat.11) (Feb 2018); 50 MHz (CA_3A_255C) [4x4 MIMO, 256 QAM] (Cat.11) (Feb 2018)	
Myanmar	ATOM Myanmar	Jan 2019	5 MHz; Jul 2016; 10 MHz, UMTS	10 MHz; Jun 2017 +10 MHz	N/A	-	5 MHz, 2.5 MHz, GSM	-	-	N/A	-	-		
Nepal	Ncell	Sep 2022	10 MHz, UMTS	20 MHz; Jun 2017	-	-	5 MHz; Jul 2021; 3 MHz, GSM	-	-	-	-	-		
Nepal	Nepal Telecom	Feb 2022	10 MHz, UMTS	20 MHz; Jan 2017	-	-	9,6 MHz, GSM	10 MHz; Jul 2021	-	-	30 MHz	-		
Nepal	Smart		-	10 MHz; Oct 2017; 2 MHz, GSM	-	-	3 MHz, 2 MHz, GSM	-	-	-	-	-		
Pakistan	Telenor	Feb 2019	5 MHz, UMTS	5 MHz; Dec 2018; 3,8 MHz, GSM	10 MHz; Aug 2016	-	4,8 MHz, GSM	-	-	-	-	-	15 MHz (CA_3A_5A) (Cat.4) (Dec 2018)	
Pakistan	Jazz	Feb 2022	10 MHz; Nov 2024	15 MHz; Dec 2014; 6 MHz, 3,8 MHz, GSM	N/A	-	5 MHz; Mar 2019; 4,8 MHz, 2,6 MHz, GSM	-	-	-	-	-	M-MIMO (Jul 2021); 256 QAM (Jul 2021); 20 MHz (CA_3A_8A) (Cat.4) (Mar 2019)	
Pakistan	Zong	Oct 2023	5-10 MHz; Sep 2014; 5-0 MHz, UMTS	15 MHz; Sep 2014; 1 MHz, GSM	N/A	-	7,6 MHz, GSM	-	-	-	-	-	M-MIMO (Jul 2022); 20 MHz (Cat.4) (Sep 2014)	
Pakistan	Ptcl		-	-	N/A	-	-	20 MHz; Sep 2018; B39; 1900 MHz; 20 MHz, TD- SCDMA	-	-	-	-	20 MHz (Cat.4) (Sep 2018)	
Pakistan	Ufone	Oct 2023	5 MHz, UMTS	10 MHz; Feb 2019; 4,9 MHz, GSM	N/A	-	5 MHz, UMTS; 2,6 MHz, GSM	-	-	-	-	-		
Philippines
Philippines	Dito	Mar 2021	20 MHz; Jul 2020	-	-	-	-	-	10 MHz; Jul 2020	-	-	20 MHz; Jul 2020	4x4 MIMO (Mar 2021); 64 QAM (Mar 2021)	
Philippines	Globe	May 2020	10 MHz, UMTS	10 MHz; Oct 2012; 7,5 MHz, 5 MHz, 5 MHz, 2,5 MHz, GSM	N/A	N/A	5 MHz, UMTS; 10 MHz, 7,5 MHz, GSM	-	15 MHz; Jun 2016 +2,5 MHz	10 MHz	15 MHz; Mar 2017 +15 MHz	40 MHz, 20 MHz; Sep 2014	2500 MHz: FWB; 75 MHz (CA_40A_41A_41C) (Cat.11) (Mar 2017)	
Philippines	Net1		N/A	N/A	N/A	N/A	N/A	-	N/A	5 MHz; Mar 2019 +5 MHz	N/A	N/A		
Philippines	Smart (PLDT) (Ultera)	Aug 2019	20 MHz; Aug 2012; 5 MHz, UMTS	15 MHz, 15 MHz; Sep 2012; 3x5 MHz, GSM	10 MHz; Sep 2012	N/A	5 MHz, UMTS; 7,5 MHz, GSM	-	15 MHz; Jun 2016 +2,5 MHz	N/A	15 MHz; Jun 2016 +15 MHz; 30 MHz, WiMAX	15 MHz; Apr 2014 +61 MHz	2500 MHz: FWB; 4x4 MIMO (Aug 2017); 256 QAM (Aug 2017); 20 MHz (CA_1A_5A) (CA_3A_5A) (Cat.4) (Aug 2014); 35 MHz (CA_1A_3A_5A) (Cat.9) (Apr 2016); 50 MHz (CA_1A_3A_5A_28A) [4x4 MIMO, 256 QAM] (Cat.11) (Aug 2017); 55 MHz (CA_1A_3C_5A_28A) [4x4 MIMO, 256 QAM] (Cat.11) (Mar 2018)	
Qatar	Ooredoo	May 2016	15 MHz, UMTS	20 MHz; Dec 2015; 5 MHz, GSM	N/A	20 MHz; Apr 2013	5 MHz, UMTS, 6 MHz, GSM	10 MHz; Apr 2013	-	-	-	-	4x4 MIMO (Mar 2017); 256 QAM (Mar 2017); 20 MHz (Cat.4) (Jan 2014); 30 MHz (CA_7A_20A) (Cat.6) (Dec 2014); 50 MHz (CA_3A_7A_20A) (Cat.9) (Dec 2015); 40 MHz (CA_3A_7A) [4x4 MIMO, 256 QAM] (Cat.15) (Mar 2017); 50 MHz (CA_3A_7A_20A) [4x4 MIMO, 256 QAM] (Cat.16) (Jun 2017)	
Qatar	Vodafone	Apr 2020	15 MHz, UMTS	20 MHz; Jun 2014; 5 MHz, GSM	N/A	20 MHz; May 2015	5 MHz, UMTS, 6 MHz, GSM	10 MHz; Jun 2014	-	-	-	-	20 MHz (CA_3A_20A) (Cat.4) (May 2015); 20 MHz (Cat.4) (Aug 2015); 50 MHz (CA_3A_7A_20A) (Cat.9) (Aug 2015); 50 MHz (CA_3A_7A_20A) [4x4 MIMO, 256 QAM] (Cat.15) (Demo)	
Russia	VimpelCom (Beeline)	Apr 2015	15 MHz; Jan 2021	(?) MHz; Nov 2016 (?) MHz, GSM	N/A	10 MHz; May 2013	(?) MHz; Feb 2023 (?) MHz, UMTS, GSM	5 MHz; Aug 2014 +2,5 MHz	7,5 MHz	N/A	-	-	4x4 MIMO (Aug 2020); 15 MHz (CA_7A_20A) (Cat.4) (Sep 2014); 20 MHz (Cat.4) (Nov 2016); B7: Frequency sharing (10+10 MHz) with MTS. Joint infrastructure operation with MTS, MegaFon and Tele2.	
Russia	MegaFon	Sep 2016	15 MHz, UMTS	(?) MHz; Feb 2015 (?) MHz, GSM	N/A	20 MHz, 20 MHz; Jan 2012 (Yota); Apr 2012 (MegaFon)	(?) MHz, GSM	5 MHz; Aug 2014 +2,5 MHz	7,5 MHz	N/A	-	20 MHz; Sep 2012; B38 +5 MHz	4x4 MIMO (Aug 2017); 256 QAM (Aug 2017); 20 MHz (Cat.4) (Feb 2014); 40 MHz (CA_7C) (Cat.6) (Feb 2014); 60 MHz (CA_3A_7C) (Cat.9) (Aug 2017); 60 MHz (CA_3A_7C) [256 QAM] (Cat.11) (Aug 2017); 60 MHz (CA_3A_7C) [4x4 MIMO, 256 QAM] (Cat.16) (Aug 2017); B38: (↓↑) 2575 – 2595 MHz, 2570 – 2575 MHz unused (GB); available in Moscow region only. Joint infrastructure operation with VimpelCom.	
Russia	Motiv	May 2018	N/A	5 MHz; Nov 2014 (?) MHz, GSM	N/A	N/A	N/A	N/A	N/A	N/A	-	(?) MHz; May 2018; B38	Available in Yekaterinburg, Kurgan, Yugra and Yamal-Nenets regions.	
Russia	MTS	Apr 2018	10 MHz; Feb 2019; 5 MHz, UMTS	10-20 MHz; Jan 2015 (?) MHz, GSM	N/A	10 MHz; May 2013	(?) MHz, GSM	5 MHz; Jan 2015 +2,5 MHz	7,5 MHz	N/A	-	20 MHz; Sep 2012; B38 +5 MHz	4x4 MIMO (Aug 2017); 256 QAM (Aug 2017); LTE-LAA (May 2018); 20 MHz (CA_3A_7A) (Cat.4) (Jun 2015); 20 MHz (Cat.4) (Nov 2015); B7: Frequency sharing (10+10 MHz) with VimpelCom. 30 MHz (CA_3A_38A) (Cat.6) (Sep 2016); 40 MHz (CA_7A_38A) [4x4 MIMO, 256 QAM] (Cat.16) (Aug 2017); 80 MHz (CA_3A_46C_46A) [4x4 MIMO, 256 QAM] (Cat.16) (May 2018); 75 MHz (CA_1A_3A_3A_7A_38A) [4x4 MIMO, 256 QAM] (Cat.20) (Demo); B38: (↓↑) 2595 – 2615 MHz, 2615 – 2620 MHz unused (GB); available in Moscow region only. B1 in remote settlements only. Joint infrastructure operation with VimpelCom.	
Russia	Tattelecom		N/A	(?) MHz; Jun 2014 (?) MHz, GSM	N/A	N/A	N/A	N/A	N/A	N/A	-	-	Available in Tatarstan.	
Russia	Tele2 (Rostelecom)		15 MHz, UMTS	(?) MHz; Dec 2014 (?) MHz, GSM	N/A	10 MHz; Jun 2013	(?) MHz, GSM	5 MHz; Jun 2013 +2,5 MHz	7,5 MHz	5 MHz; May 2016	(?) MHz; Apr 2021	-	Joint infrastructure operation with VimpelCom.	
Russia	Vainakh Telecom		N/A	(?)	N/A	N/A	(?)	N/A	N/A	N/A	(?) MHz; Sep 2013	-	Available in Chechnya.	
Saudi Arabia	Mobily	?	20 MHz, UMTS	20 MHz, Jan 2013	N/A	N/A	10 MHz, GSM	10 MHz	-	-	N/A	20 MHz; Sep 2011	4x4 MIMO (Aug 2016); 20 MHz [4x4 MIMO] (Cat.6) (Aug 2016)	
Saudi Arabia	stc	Apr 2016	10 MHz; Mar 2018; 10 MHz, UMTS	20 MHz, Feb 2013; 15 MHz, GSM	N/A	N/A	15 MHz, GSM	-	20 MHz	-	40 MHz, Feb 2014	N/A	20 MHz (Cat.4) (Feb 2014); 60 MHz (CA_3A_40C) (Cat.9) (2015 ?)	
Saudi Arabia	Zain	May 2016	10 MHz; Jun 2015; 10 MHz, UMTS	10 MHz, Sep 2011; 10 MHz, GSM	N/A	N/A	5 MHz, May 2016; 5 MHz, GSM	10 MHz	-	-	N/A	20 MHz, Sep 2011	20 MHz (CA_1A_3A) (Cat.4) (Jun 2015); 25 MHz (CA_1A_3A_8A) (Cat.9) (May 2016)	
Singapore	M1	Apr 2015	19,8 MHz, UMTS	20 MHz; Jun 2011	-	20 MHz; Jun 2011	5 MHz ?	-	10 MHz	-	-	-	20 MHz (Cat.4) (Apr 2014); 40 MHz (CA_3A_7A) (Cat.6) (Dec 2014)	
Singapore	Singtel	May 2014	15 MHz, 5 MHz, UMTS	20 MHz, 10 MHz; Dec 2011	-	20 MHz; Dec 2011	10 MHz; Jul 2015	-	20 MHz	-	-	15 MHz	4x4 MIMO (Jul 2017); 256 QAM (Apr 2017); 20 MHz (Cat.4) (May 2013); 40 MHz (CA_3A_7A) (Cat.6) (Jun 2014); 60 MHz (CA_3C_7A_8A) (Cat.9) (Jan 2017); 50 MHz (CA_3C_7A) (CA_3A_7A_8A) [256 QAM] (Cat.11) (Apr 2017); 50 MHz (CA_3A_7A_8A) [4x4 MIMO] (Cat.15) (Jul 2017); 40 MHz (CA_3A_7A) [4x4 MIMO, 256 QAM] (Cat.15) (Jul 2017); 60 MHz (CA_3C_7A_8A) [4x4 MIMO, 256 QAM] (Cat.18) (May 2018); 80 MHz (CA_1A_3C_7A_38A) [4x4 MIMO, 256 QAM] (Cat.19) (Demo)	
Singapore	StarHub		15 MHz; Apr 2016; 5 MHz, UMTS	20 MHz; Sep 2012 +5 MHz	-	20 MHz; Oct 2013	5 MHz ?	-	15 MHz	-	-	20 MHz; Aug 2017	4x4 MIMO (Apr 2018); 256 QAM (Apr 2016); 20 MHz (Cat.4) (Jul 2014); 40 MHz (CA_3A_7A) (Cat.6) (Jan 2015); 55 MHz (CA_1A_3A_7A) (Cat.11) (Apr 2016); 50 MHz (CA_1A_3A_7A) [4x4 MIMO, 256 QAM] (Cat.16) (Apr 2018); 70 MHz (CA_1A_3A_7A_38A) [4x4 MIMO] (Cat.16) (Apr 2018)	
Singapore	SIMBA Telecom	Mar 2020	N/A	N/A	-	N/A	10 MHz, Mar 2020	-	N/A	-	40 MHz; Mar 2020	10 MHz; Mar 2020; B38	4x4 MIMO (Mar 2020); 256 QAM (Mar 2020); 40 MHz (CA_40C) (Cat.11) (Mar 2020); 50 MHz (CA_38A-40C) (Cat.11) (Mar 2020)	
South Korea	KT	Oct 2012	15 MHz; Jan 2015; 5 MHz, UMTS	20 MHz, Jan 2012 +10 MHz	N/A	-	10 MHz; Sep 2013	-	-	-	-	-	LTE-LAA (Jun 2015); 20 MHz (CA_3A_8A) (Cat.4) (Sep 2013); 20 MHz (Wideband) (Cat.4) (Sep 2013); 20 MHz (CA_1A_8A) (Cat.4) (Jan 2015); 30 MHz (CA_3A_8A) (Cat.6) (Jun 2014); 30 MHz (CA_1A_3A) (Cat.6) (Jan 2015); 40 MHz (CA_1A_3A_8A) (Cat.9) (Jan 2015); 160 MHz (CA_1A_3A_8A_; 255C_255C_255C) (Cat.18) (Jun 2015)	
South Korea	LG U^{+}	Aug 2012	20 MHz; Jul 2012	-	10 MHz, Jul 2011	20 MHz; Dec 2013	N/A	-	-	-	-	-	256 QAM (Mar 2016); LTE-LAA (Jun 2015); 20 MHz (CA_1A_5A) (Cat.4) (Jul 2013); 20 MHz (Wideband) (Cat.4) (Dec 2013); 30 MHz (CA_1A_7A) (CA_5A_7A) (Cat.6) (Jun 2014); 40 MHz (CA_1A_5A_7A) (Cat.9) (Jan 2015); 40 MHz (CA_1A_5A_7A) [256 QAM] (Cat.11) (Mar 2016); 160 MHz (CA_1A_5A_7A_; 255C_255C_255C) (Cat.18) (Jun 2015)	
South Korea	SK Telecom	Aug 2012	15 MHz; Jun 2013; 5 MHz, UMTS	20 MHz, Jul 2012	10 MHz, Jul 2011 +5 MHz	20 MHz, 10 MHz; Jun 2017	N/A	-	-	-	-	-	4x4 MIMO (Jun 2017); 256 QAM (Jun 2016); LTE-LAA (Jun 2015); 20 MHz (CA_1A_5A) (CA_3A_5A) (Cat.4) (Jun 2013); 20 MHz (Wideband) (Cat.4) (Sep 2013); 50 MHz (CA_1A_3A_7A) (CA_3A_5A_7A) (Cat.11) (Jun 2014); 40 MHz (CA_1A_3A_5A) (Cat.9) (Jan 2015); 40 MHz (CA_1A_5A_7A) [256 QAM] (Cat.11) (Jun 2016); 70 MHz (CA_1A_3A_5A_7A_7A) [256 QAM] (Cat.15) (Jun 2017); 60 MHz (CA_1A_3A_5A_7A) [4x4 MIMO, 256 QAM] (Cat.15) (Jun 2017); 50 MHz (CA_1A_3A_7A) [4x4 MIMO, 256 QAM] (Cat.16) (Jun 2017); 60 MHz (CA_1A_3A_5A_7A) [4x4 MIMO, 256 QAM] (Cat.16) (Mar 2018); 160 MHz (CA_1A_5A_7A_; 255C_255C_255C) (Cat.18) (Jun 2015)	
Sri Lanka	Dialog	Apr 2017	15 MHz, UMTS	15 MHz; Apr 2013; 10 MHz, GSM	-	-	7.5 MHz, GSM	-	-	-	20 MHz; Dec 2012 +40 MHz +15 MHz	-	FWB; 75 MHz (CA_40C_40C) [4x4 MIMO, 256 QAM] (Cat.16) (Demo)	
Sri Lanka	Hutch		20 MHz, UMTS	15 MHz; Oct 2018	-	-	5 MHz; Feb 2020; 10 MHz, GSM	-	-	-	-	-		
Sri Lanka	Lanka Bell		-	-	-	-	-	-	-	-	20 MHz; Feb 2014 +5 MHz	-	FWB	
Sri Lanka	Mobitel (SLT)	Jun 2016	10 MHz; Feb 2018; 5 MHz, UMTS	10 MHz; Jan 2013; 5 MHz, 5 MHz, GSM	-	-	5 MHz, Oct 2017; 2.5 MHz, GSM	-	-	-	-	20 MHz; Jan 2014; B38; 2600 MHz +20 MHz	B38: FWB; 40 MHz (CA_38C) [4x4 MIMO, 256 QAM] (Cat.15) (Demo)	
Taiwan	Asia Pacific Telecom (Gt)	May 2015	N/A	-	-	N/A	10 MHz; Jul 2017	-	10 MHz; Dec 2014	-	-	20 MHz; Sep 2018 +30 MHz	4x4 MIMO (Feb 2019); 256 QAM (Feb 2019); 30 MHz (CA_8A_38A) (CA_28A_38A) (Cat.11) (Feb 2019)	
Taiwan	Chunghwa	Nov 2017	20 MHz; Jan 2019	20 MHz, 10 MHz; May 2014	-	20 MHz, 10 MHz; Mar 2016	10 MHz; Dec 2014	-	N/A	-	-	N/A	256 QAM (Jul 2017); 20 MHz (Wideband) (Cat.4) (Dec 2014); 25 MHz (CA_3A_8A) (Cat.6) (Dec 2014); 30 MHz (CA_7A_8A) (Cat.6) (Mar 2016); 45 MHz (CA_3A_7A_8A) (Cat.9) (Mar 2016); 55 MHz (CA_3A_7A_7A_8A) [256 QAM] (Cat.11) (Jul 2017); 60 MHz (CA_3A_3A_7A_7A) [256 QAM] (Cat.11) (Apr 2018); 65 MHz (CA_3A_3A_7A_7A_8A) [4x4 MIMO, 256 QAM] (Cat.16) (Demo)	
Taiwan	FarEasTone	Jun 2015	15 MHz; Jan 2019	20 MHz; Aug 2014	-	20 MHz; Mar 2016	N/A	-	15 MHz; Jun 2014	-	-	25 MHz	4x4 MIMO (Nov 2017); 256 QAM (Nov 2017); 20 MHz (CA_3A_28A) (Cat.4) (Aug 2014); 20 MHz (Wideband) (Cat.4) (Mar 2016); 40 MHz (CA_3A_7A_28A) (Cat.9) (Mar 2016); 40 MHz (CA_3A_7A) [4x4 MIMO, 256 QAM] (Cat.15) (Demo)	
Taiwan	Taiwan Mobile	Dec 2015; Jan 2016	20 MHz; Jan 2019 +5 MHz	15 MHz; Sep 2014	-	20 MHz; Apr 2016	10 MHz; Aug 2014	-	20 MHz; Jun 2014	-	-	N/A	4x4 MIMO (Jun 2017); 256 QAM (Apr 2019); 20 MHz (CA_3A_28A) (Cat.4) (Sep 2014); 20 MHz (Wideband) (Cat.4) (Feb 2015)/ (Apr 2016); 30 MHz (CA_3A_28A) (CA_7A_8A) (Cat.6) (May 2015); 30 MHz (CA_7A_8A) [4x4 MIMO] (Cat.9) (Jun 2017); 30 MHz (CA_7A_8A) [4x4 MIMO, 256 QAM] (Cat.11) (Apr 2019)	
Thailand	AIS	Mar 2016	10 MHz; Jan 2016; 5 MHz, UMTS	20 MHz; Jan 2016	N/A	N/A	5 MHz; May 2017; 5 MHz, GSM	-	20 MHz, 5G NR	-	-	100 MHz, 5G NR	4x4 MIMO (Mar 2016); 256 QAM (Mar 2016); 64 QAM UL (Mar 2017); LTE-LAA (Aug 2017); 20 MHz (CA_1A_3A) (Cat.4) (Jan 2016); 25 MHz (CA_1A_3A) (Cat.6) (Mar 2016); 30 MHz (CA_1A_3A_8A) (Cat.9) (Jul 2016); 30 MHz (CA_1A_255A) (CA_3A_255A) [4x4 MIMO, 256 QAM] (Cat.11) (Mar 2016); 50 MHz (CA_1A_255C) (CA_3A_255C) [4x4 MIMO, 256 QAM] (Cat.16) (Aug 2017)	
Thailand	DTAC / True	Oct 2015; May 2016	20 MHz; May 2013; 10 MHz, UMTS	15 MHz; Dec 2015; 5 MHz, GSM	15 MHz, UMTS	N/A	10 MHz; Dec 2015 +5 MHz	-	20 MHz; Dec 2020 (5G NR)	-	60 MHz; Jun 2018	90 MHz, 5G NR	4x4 MIMO (Jul 2017); 20 MHz (CA_1A_3A) (CA_3A_8A) (Cat.4) (Dec 2015); 30 MHz (CA_1A_3A_8A) (Cat.9) (Jul 2016); 30 MHz (CA_1A_3A_8A) [4x4 MIMO] (Cat.11) (Jul 2016)	
Turkey	Turkcell	Apr 2016	20 MHz; Apr 2016; 10 MHz, UMTS	20 MHz; Apr 2016; 9,8 MHz, GSM	N/A	20 MHz; Apr 2016 +5 MHz	12,4 MHz, GSM	10 MHz; Apr 2016	-	-	-	10 MHz	4x4 MIMO (Apr 2016); 256 QAM (Apr 2016); 20 MHz (Cat.4) (Apr 2016); 30 MHz (CA_3A_20A) (Cat.6) (Apr 2016); 50 MHz (CA_3A_7A_20A) (Cat.9) (Apr 2016); 60 MHz (CA_1A_3A_7A) (Cat.9) (Apr 2016); 60 MHz (CA_1A_3A_7A) [256 QAM] (Cat.11) (Apr 2016); 60 MHz (CA_1A_3A_7A) [4x4 MIMO, 256 QAM] (Cat.18) (May 2018)	
Turkey	Türk Telekom	Apr 2016	15 MHz, UMTS	20 MHz, 15 MHz; Apr 2016	N/A	10 MHz; Apr 2016	10 MHz; Apr 2016 or GSM	10 MHz; Apr 2016	-	-	-	15 MHz; Apr 2016	256 QAM (Apr 2016); 20 MHz (Cat.4) (Apr 2016); 55 MHz (CA_3C_7A_20A) (Cat.11) (Apr 2016); 55 MHz (CA_3C_7A_20A) [256 QAM] (Cat.15) (Apr 2016)	
Turkey	Vodafone	Apr 2016	15 MHz; Aug 2021; DSS^{†} with UMTS	10 MHz; Apr 2016	N/A	15 MHz; Apr 2016	5-10 MHz; Jan 2018; 7,4- 2,4 MHz, GSM	10 MHz; Apr 2016	-	-	-	10 MHz; Apr 2016	4x4 MIMO (Apr 2016); 256 QAM (Apr 2016); 35 MHz (CA_3A_7A_20A) (Cat.9) (Apr 2016); 35 MHz (CA_3A_7A_20A) [4x4 MIMO, 256 QAM] (Cat.11) (Apr 2016)	^{†} Dynamic Spectrum Sharing
UAE	du	Oct 2014	10 MHz, UMTS	20 MHz; Aug 2012; 15 MHz, GSM	N/A	-	4,8 MHz, 4,6 MHz, GSM	10 MHz; Mar 2015	-	-	-	-	20 MHz (Cat.4) (Aug 2012); 30 MHz (CA_3A_20A) (Cat.6) (Mar 2015)	
UAE	Etisalat	Jul 2016	15 MHz, UMTS	20 MHz, 20 MHz; Sep 2011	N/A	20 MHz; Sep 2011	24,6 MHz, GSM	20 MHz; Sep 2014	-	-	-	-	256 QAM (Oct 2015); 20 MHz (Cat.4) (Jun 2013); 40 MHz (CA_3A_7A) / (CA_3A_20A) (Cat.6) (Nov 2014); 60 MHz (CA_3A_7A_20A) (Cat.9) (Oct 2015); 60 MHz (CA_3A_7A_20A) [256 QAM] (Cat.11) (Oct 2015); 80 MHz (CA_3A_3A_7A_20A) [256 QAM] (Cat.15) (Oct 2015)	
Vietnam	VNPT Vinaphone		15 MHz, UMTS	20 MHz; Nov 2016	N/A	-	8,4 MHz, GSM	-	-	-	-	-		
Vietnam	Viettel		5 MHz, 2019; 10 MHz, UMTS	20 MHz; Apr 2017	N/A	-	8,2 MHz, GSM	-	-	-	-	-		

== Deployments in the 3400–3800 MHz range ==
Country	Operator	ƒ (MHz)	B	Launch date Cat.3 ≤ 100 Mbit/s	Launch date Cat.4 ≤ 150 Mbit/s	Launch date Cat.6 ≤ 300 Mbit/s	Notes
Azerbaijan	Sazz	3500; 3700	42; 43	Jun 2018			
Bahrain	Batelco	3500	42	Feb 2014	?	Sep 2016	FWB
Iran	Mobinnet	3500	42	Jan 2017			60 MHz in use
Iran	MTN Irancell	3500	42	Aug 2016			60 MHz in use
Jordan	Umniah	3500	42	Mar 2016	Mar 2016		20 MHz
Pakistan	Wi-Tribe	3500	42	June 2017 (?)			

== Commercial deployments (old table format) ==
Country	Operator	ƒ (MHz)	B	VoLTE	Launch date Cat.3 ≤ 100 Mbit/s	Launch date Cat.4 ≤ 150 Mbit/s	Launch date Cat.6 ≤ 300 Mbit/s	Notes
Abkhazia	A-Mobile	800	20		Jun 2014			
Abkhazia	Aquafon	800	20		Aug 2014			
Azerbaijan	Nakhtel	(?)	(?)		Nov 2016			Available in Nakhchivan.
Bhutan	BT (B-Mobile)	1800	3		Oct 2013			
Bhutan	Tashicell	700	28		Apr 2016			
Brunei	DST	1800	3		Nov 2013			
Iraq	Goran Net	2300	40		2015			Available in Kurdistan.
Iraq	Newroz Telecom	2300	40		2015			Available in Kurdistan.
Iraq	Regional Telecom (Fastlink)	2600	7		Jun 2013			Available in Kurdistan.
Iraq	Tishknet	2500	41		Dec 2015			Available in Kurdistan.
Kazakhstan	Beeline	800	20		Jul 2016	N/A		10 MHz; Available in Almaty.
Kazakhstan	Beeline	1800	3		Jul 2016			10 MHz in use Available in Uralsk and Aksay.
Kazakhstan	Beeline	2100	1		Jul 2016			10 MHz in use Available in Almaty
Kazakhstan	Kcell	800	20		Sep 2016			
Kazakhstan	Kcell	1800	3		Sep 2016			
Kazakhstan	Kazakhtelecom (Altel) / Tele2	800	20		Apr 2017	N/A	Apr 2017	
Kazakhstan	Kazakhtelecom (Altel) / Tele2	1800	3		Dec 2013 / Mar 2016	Apr 2017	Apr 2017	
North Korea	Kangsong NET	?	?		Sep 2023			
Maldives	Dhiraagu	1800	3		Oct 2014	Sep 2015	Sep 2015	20 MHz; CA of 40 MHz (CA_3A_7A).
Maldives	Dhiraagu	2600	7		Sep 2015	Sep 2015	Sep 2015	20 MHz; CA of 40 MHz (CA_3A_7A).
Maldives	Ooredoo	700	28	Apr 2019	Apr 2013	(?)	Jan 2017 (?)	20 MHz; Provider formerly branded as Wataniya.
Oman	Omantel	1800	3		Jan 2013			
Oman	Omantel	2300	40		Jul 2012			
Oman	Ooredoo	800	20		Mar 2016			
Oman	Ooredoo	1800	3		Feb 2013			
Oman	Ooredoo	2300	40		Sep 2014			
South Ossetia	MegaFon	(?)	(?)		Mar 2013			
Syria	MTN	1800	3		Oct 2018			20 MHz
Syria	Syriatel	1800	3		Aug 2017			20 MHz
Tajikistan	Babilon Mobile	1800	3		Oct 2012			Available in Dushanbe, Khujand, Qurghonteppa.
Tajikistan	Babilon Mobile	2100	1		Oct 2012			Available in Kulob.
Tajikistan	MegaFon	800; 1800; 2300; 2600	20; 3; 40; 7	Dec 2020	Jun 2016			
Tajikistan	Tcell	800	20		Apr 2014			Available in metropolitan areas.
Tajikistan	ZET-Mobile	800	20		?			
Tajikistan	ZET-Mobile	2100	1		?			
Timor-Leste	Telkomcel	1800	3		Sep 2017			
Timor-Leste	Telemor	1800	3		Aug 2017			
Timor-Leste	Timor Telecom	1800	3		Sep 2017			
Turkmenistan	Altyn Asyr (TMCELL)	2600	7		Sep 2013			Available in Ashgabat and Türkmenbaşy.
Uzbekistan	Beeline	2600	7	Oct 2023	Sep 2014			10 MHz Available in Tashkent.
Uzbekistan	Super iMAX (EVO)	2300	40		Apr 2015			Available in metropolitan areas.
Uzbekistan	UCell	700	28		?			
Uzbekistan	UCell	1800	3		?			
Uzbekistan	UCell	2600	7	Oct 2023	Nov 2014	Nov 2014		Available in Tashkent, Samarkand, Bukhara, Navoi and Zarafshan.
Uzbekistan	Uzmobile GSM	1800	3	Jan 2024	Jun 2016			
Uzbekistan	Mobiuz (UMS)	800	20	Jun 2023	Jun 2016			10 MHz; Available in Tashkent and Samarkand.
Yemen	AdenNet	?	?		Jun 2018 ?			((WP:SPS))

== See also ==
- LTE
- LTE frequency bands
- List of LTE networks
- List of UMTS networks
- List of HSPA+ networks
- List of CDMA2000 networks
- UMTS frequency bands
- List of mobile network operators of the Asia Pacific region
- Mobile Network Codes in ITU region 4xx (Asia)
