= Post Telecom =

Mobile phone operator in Luxembourg

LuxGSM S.A., now known as POST, is a Luxembourgish mobile phone network operator. It has 250,000 subscribers, making it the largest network in Luxembourg. From 2004 until 2009, LuxGSM was the national partner of Vodafone, and its customers had access to Vodafone's network whilst roaming. However, the agreement ended in early 2009, with Tango replacing LuxGSM as the partner network for Luxembourg of Vodafone.

It is 100% owned by P&TLuxembourg, a government-owned corporation that provides mail and telecommunication services.

LuxGSM competes with Tango, Orange Luxembourg (formerly VOX mobile) and Join Experience.

On September 30, 2013, P&TLuxembourg and LuxGSM merged into a single brand, POST Luxembourg. The LUXGSM network was therefore renamed POST.
