= Telemach =

Telemach is a brand of United Group.

It may refer to:

- Telemach (Bosnia and Herzegovina)
- Telemach (Montenegro)
- Telemach (Croatia)
- Telemach (Slovenia)
