= Edzcom =

Finnish telecom company

Edzcom Oy
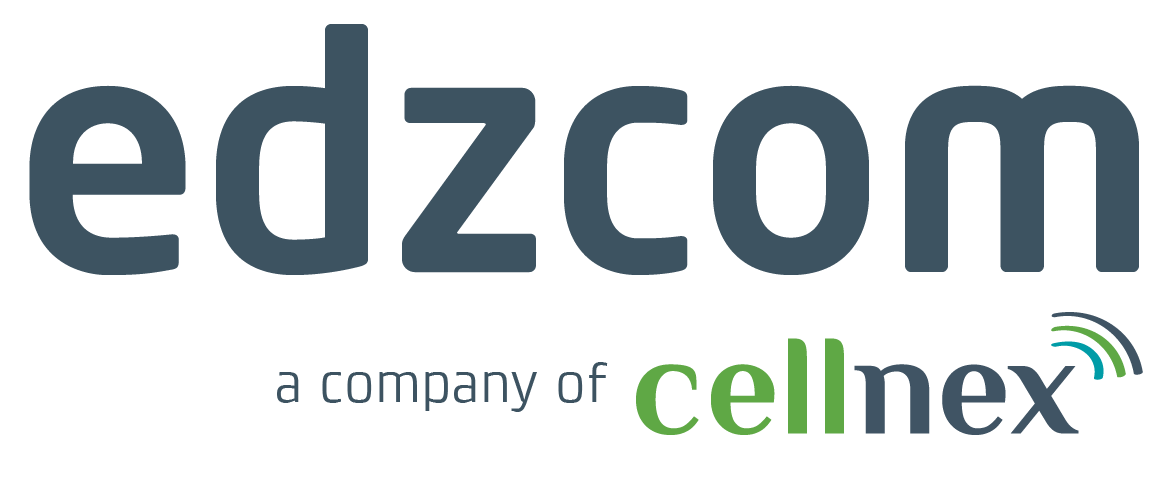
- Edzcom's logo, used since January 2022
- Industry: Private Network; Heavy Industries
- Founded: 2014; 12 years ago
- Headquarters: Gräsantörmä 2, Espoo, 02200, Finland
- Area served: Europe
- Parent: Independent (2014-20); Cellnex Telecom (2020-24); Boldyn Networks (2024–present)

Edzcom Oy (formerly Ukkoverkot and Ukko Mobile until 30 March 2020) is the Nordic integrator of Edge Connectivity. Until January 2022, the firm has brought 40 implementations of private network for many enterprises such as Kalmar, Finavia, Steveco, Kone, etc.

Even after being acquired by Cellnex Telecom in July 2020, it continued to provide and operate private networks to enterprise customers. Since then, Edzcom had extended to UK's and French market, and had been developing across Europe as a Cellnex company.

On March 1, 2024, Edzcom was among the assets of Cellnex Private Networks acquired by Boldyn Networks.

== See also ==
- Net 1
- Cellnex Telecom
- Boldyn Networks
