= Netcore =

Global marketing technology company

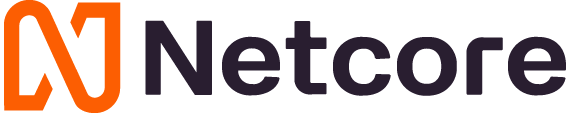
- Type: Private
- Industry: Marketing Technology
- Founded: December 9, 1997; 28 years ago
- Founder: Rajesh Jain
- Headquarters: Mumbai, India
- Area served: Worldwide
- Number of employees: 1,000–5,000
- Website: www.netcore.ai

Netcore is a marketing technology company. Its products include a customer engagement platform, email marketing, agentic marketing, marketing automation, personalization, and customer data tools. It was founded by Rajesh Jain in 1997 as Netcore Solutions.

== History ==
Netcore was founded on December 9, 1997. Originally known as Netcore Solutions, the company was rebranded as Netcore Cloud Pvt. Ltd. three years ago.

In 1997, Netcore started as a provider of end-to-end Linux-based messaging, collaboration, and archiving services. By 2006, Netcore introduced MOBILITY SMS SOLUTION, an SMS marketing platform for enterprises. In 2009, the company launched an enterprise-grade email marketing platform.

In 2012, Netcore developed mobility voice solution, which offered IVR, Missed Call, and Outbound Dialing (OBD) services. In 2015, Netcore introduced Netcore SMARTECH, a cross-channel marketing automation platform.

Between 2016 and 2017, the company expanded to Southeast Asia, Africa, and the United States, while also launching a new brand identity. In 2019, Netcore integrated analytics, chatbots, AI, and machine learning into its services. In the same year, the company acquired Boxx.ai by for approximately $500,000.

In 2020, Netcore acquired Quinto.ai and Hansel.io for undisclosed amounts. In March 2022, the company bought Unbxd.ai for approximately $100 million. In 2024, Netcore won Gold for the Innovative Customer Experience Management Solution and the Best Email Marketing Platform at the ET Martech+ 2024 Awards.

In 2022 Netcore acquired a 90% stake in U.S.-based Unbxd for $100 million.

In 2026, Netcore Cloud rebranded as Netcore.ai, adopting the new name as part of its transition to an agentic marketing platform.
