= Net 1 =

Nordic telecommunications company

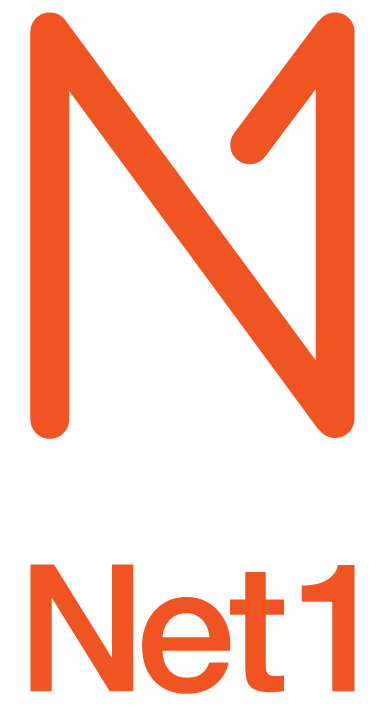
- The stylised orange "N" is in use for Net1 Denmark and Sweden since 2010, Net1 Indonesia from 2017 as well as for Net1 Philippines since 2019.
- Industry: Telecommunications
- Founded: 2003; 23 years ago (as Nordisk Mobiltelefon)
- Headquarters: Stockholm, Sweden
- Area served: Denmark, Indonesia, Philippines, Norway, Sweden
- Key people: Amit Vithlani (CEO, Net 1 International); J.D. Fouchard (Chairman of the board, Net 1 International); Maria Sandgren (CEO, Net 1 Sweden); Ingvild Ragna Myhre (Chairman, ice.no); Eivind Helgaker (Managing Director, ice.no); Larry Ridwan (CEO, Net 1 Indonesia); Beatriz Padilla (CEO, Net 1 Philippines)
- Website: net1.dk (Denmark) net1.co.id (Indonesia) net1.no (Norway) net1.ph (Philippines) net1.se (Sweden)

Net 1 is a Nordic telecommunications company operating 4G LTE mobile broadband networks in Norway, Sweden and Denmark since 2015, in Indonesia since 2017, and in the Philippines since 2019. Since February 2019, the Swedish operations of Net 1 are owned by Teracom, while the Danish operations of Net 1 are owned by Cibicom A/S since 2020. The Norwegian operations are owned by Ice group.

== History ==
Ice Norway's new logo, introduced in 2018.

Nordisk Mobiltelefon was founded in 2003, and in 2005 received a ten-year licence from the Swedish Post and Telecom Authority (PTS) to operate a digital CDMA2000 450 MHz mobile telephone network in Sweden, using the analogue NMT-450 band inherited from Telia. The NMT-450 and CDMA2000 networks greatly exceeded the range of GSM and its geographical coverage, and is extensively used by the logging industry and users in remote rural areas. Nordisk Mobiltelefon was co-founded by Arnfinn Röste. During 2008, the company introduced Ice.net which is the brand name that was used commercially until 2010 (in Denmark and Sweden).

In February 2009 Nordisk Mobiltelefon went bankrupt, and U.S. based industrial group Access Industries subsequently took over the network on 10 March 2009, and continued to operate it under the Ice brand.

In Sweden and Denmark, the brand name Net 1 replaced the Nordisk Mobiltelefon name in May 2010. In Norway it remains ice, of which the latter introduced a new logo and branding in 2018.

In 2015, Ice group acquired Network Norway, which made Ice the third mobile network operator (MNO) in Norway, following Tele2's exit from the Norwegian market that same year. Since then, Ice has implemented and continues to extend its own 4G LTE network, with national roaming on Telia Norge's network outside of Ice group's own mobile phone network. That same year, Net 1 acquired a minority stake in the Indonesian CDMA2000 mobile telephone operator Sampoerna Telekomunikasi Indonesia (id) and on 27 June 2017, the Net 1 Indonesia branding was introduced to replace Sampoerna's previous Ceria branding, after Sampoerna acquired a 4G LTE licence in the 450 MHz band (LTE band 31) for Aceh, Lombok, Maluku, Serang and South Sulawesi. The operating license of Net 1 Indonesia was revoked on 30 November 2021.

In December 2018, Ice Group transferred its ownership of the non-Scandinavian operations to Net 1 International, who today handles operations for Net 1 Indonesia and Net 1 Philippines.

Teracom subsequently acquired the Swedish operations of Net 1 from Access Industries on 25 February 2019, and gradually rebranded it to Teracom Mobil during 2020–2022, at the same time completely exiting from the consumer sector to focus purely on the B2B and B2G sectors. Teracom Mobil's 450 MHz (LTE band 31) licence is valid from 5 March 2020 until 31 December 2044.

In March 2019, the Net 1 brand was officially launched in the Philippines. This is after Net 1 International entered a partnership with Citadel Holdings, Inc. to operate the internet service provider Broadband Everywhere (BE), which was subsequently renamed to Net 1 Philippines. The company currently holds the franchise to operate two frequencies in the Philippines: 450 MHz (awarded in 2006) and 3.5 GHz. The Net 1 network in the Philippines currently offers coverage in six provinces in Luzon: Bataan, Batangas, Bulacan, Cavite, Laguna, and Pampanga.

== Upgrade to 4G LTE ==
In 2015, the networks in Norway, Sweden and Denmark were upgraded from CDMA to 4G LTE using the same 450 MHz frequencies (LTE band 31). The Norwegian subsidiary also holds other frequency licenses for its mobile phone network. The new LTE networks maintain the same extensive geographic coverage as the former NMT-450 and CDMA2000 networks, while greatly increasing speeds overall.
