= Telecommunications in Guernsey =

The telecommunications in Guernsey relate to communication systems in Bailiwick of Guernsey, which is a British Crown Dependency off the coast of Normandy, France.

== Internet ==
Guernsey broadband consumers pay lower prices than nations like Bermuda, but higher prices than in the UK or the Isle of Man.

Sure all owns all physical broadband lines in Guernsey and JT obtains services through wholesale agreements. From early 2022, Sure is undertaking a rollout of fibre-optic broadband as part of the States of Guernsey. This is an investment of £37.5 million into the island's infrastructure. Sure's goal is near-complete fibre coverage by end 2026. Despite increasing speeds, Sure's infrastructure falls behind in speeds compared to neighbouring Jersey. The States of Guernsey did not invest heavily in fibre optics like the States of Jersey. As such, Guernsey has average broadband speeds of 36.8 Mbit/s.

Internet connectivity to the rest of the world is provided by undersea cables linked to Jersey, the UK and France. In 2016, a ship – believed to be the King Arthur owned by Mediterranea di Navigazione – dragging its anchor on the seabed in the English Channel cut the three main internet cables to Jersey and Guernsey. As a result, all communications traffic had to travel via cables to France.

== Mobile telephones ==
Guernsey is part of the UK's National Telephone Numbering Plan, which means the island shares the UK's international dialling code +44. The area code for Guernsey (landlines) is 01481.

In 2020, Sure retains the majority mobile market share of 55%, compared with 24% for Airtel-Vodafone and 21% for JT, the island's other mobile operators. In 2020, there were 71,622 mobile subscriptions, of which 2,845 were mobile only.

Mobile data prices are lower in Guernsey than other similarly sized countries, such as Bermuda and Malta, but slightly higher than the major operators in the UK. In 2020, the following mobile usage statistics were recorded: 121.9 million mobile minutes, 27.6 million SMS messages and 5.91 million GB of data used.

== Mass media ==
=== Radio ===
==== Radio broadcast stations ====
- BBC Radio Guernsey 93.2 MHz FM, 1116 kHz MW AM, DAB+ and bbc.co.uk/guernsey.
- Island FM 104.7 MHz FM, DAB+ and https://islandfm.com.

==== Radio receiver adoption and usage ====
Not available

=== Television ===
==== Television broadcast stations ====
- ITV Channel Television.
- Sub Opt from BBC One of Spotlight Channel Islands.

==== Satellite television ====
- BSkyB

==== Television set adoption and usage ====
Not available

=== Internet service providers (ISPs) ===
- JT Group Limited which owns most of the telecommunications infrastructure in Jersey
- Newtel Solutions
- Sure
- Airtel-Vodafone (data-based only)

== Postal services ==
=== Postal operator ===
- Guernsey Post

=== Regulation ===
- Guernsey Competition Regulatory Authority
