= COVID-19 pandemic in Guernsey =

COVID-19 pandemic in the Bailiwick of Guernsey
- Disease: COVID-19
- Pathogen: SARS-CoV-2
- Location: Bailiwick of Guernsey
- First outbreak: Wuhan, Hubei, China
- Index case: Imported from Tenerife, Spain
- Arrival date: 9 March 2020 (6 years, 7 months and 3 weeks ago)
- Confirmed cases: 2456
- Active cases: 304
- Recovered: 2131
- Deaths: 17 confirmed as being due to COVID-19
- Fatality rate: 1.7%

Government website
- covid19.gov.gg

The COVID-19 pandemic in the Bailiwick of Guernsey was a part of the worldwide pandemic of coronavirus disease 2019 (COVID-19) caused by severe acute respiratory syndrome coronavirus 2 (SARS-CoV-2). The Bailiwick has been successful in limiting and preventing the spread of the virus through a rigorous system of testing, tracing and isolating suspected and confirmed cases and requiring arrivals to self-isolate for 14 (or in some cases only 7) days. (Note: As of January 2021, arrivals who refuse to be tested on the first and thirteenth days of their self-isolation period must isolate for 21 days.) The States of Guernsey co-ordinates the pandemic response (Note: Guernsey is a self-governing jurisdiction and does not form part of the UK.) which has been praised for its transparency and clarity and held up as an exemplar of good communication.

Initially, the objective was to "flatten the curve", which refers to slowing the infection rate to decrease the risk of health services being overwhelmed and allow for the better management of cases until a vaccine or specific antiviral treatment was available. In early February 2020, preventative measures were recommended including hand washing, good respiratory hygiene, social distancing and avoiding non-essential travel. The Bailiwick's first case was identified on 9 March 2020 in Guernsey. Soon after, emergency legislation was enacted and arrivals were ordered to self-isolate. (Note: All Emergency Powers legislation determined by the HSC and enacted by the CCA was later debated and approved by the island's legislative body, the States of Deliberation.) On 25 March 2020, following the first known instance of on-island transmission, a lockdown order was imposed. By late April 2020, the Bailiwick entered a six-stage phased release from lockdown and, by mid-May 2020, the States sought elimination of the virus. From late June 2020 to January 2021, life within the Bailiwick effectively returned to normal with no restrictions on gatherings and no requirements for people to socially distance or use face coverings.

On 23 January 2021, a second lockdown was imposed following the identification of four unexplained cases in the community, which resulted in a second wave of community-seeded infections, greater in volume than the first.

The pandemic and the measures taken to contain its spread have caused socio-economic disruption in the Bailiwick, including an initial economic downturn compared to that seen during the 2008 financial crisis, triggering the COVID-19 recession. It resulted in the postponement or cancellation of cultural, political and sporting events including the island's annual Liberation Day celebrations and its first island-wide election, and temporary closures of schools and colleges. During lockdown restrictions, initial fears of supply shortages resulted in panic buying and concerns were raised over worsening mental health and an increase in domestic abuse. Measures were implemented by the States to mitigate the various wider impacts of the pandemic.

== Background and preparations ==
On 31 December 2019, China reported a cluster of pneumonia cases in its city of Wuhan. On 7 January 2020, the Chinese health authorities confirmed that this cluster was caused by a novel infectious disease. The World Health Organization (WHO) issued technical briefings on 10 and 11 January, warning about a strong possibility of human-to-human transmission and urging precautions. On 20 January, the WHO and China confirmed that human-to-human transmission had occurred.

By March 2020, more than 170 countries and territories had been affected, with major outbreaks in China, Italy, South Korea and Iran. On 11 March 2020 the WHO characterised the spread of COVID-19 as a pandemic. The case fatality ratio for COVID-19 was lower than SARS of 2003, but the transmission was significantly greater, with a significant total death toll.

Previously, in November 2019, the States had successfully conducted an exercise of the Channel Islands Strategic Pandemic Influenza Plan, a simulation flu pandemic exercise led by Public Health. The exercise was prompted by pandemic outbreak being moved to the top of the island's risk register following public health advice from the WHO.

The States first acknowledged the emergence of a novel coronavirus, referred to then as 2019-nCoV Novel Coronavirus (Wuhan Virus), on 23 January when there were 571 known cases of infection worldwide and asserted in a media statement that they were "in a good position to respond to the developing 2019-nCoV situation". On 30 January, the WHO declared the outbreak a Public Health Emergency of International Concern, warning that "all countries should be prepared for containment." Testing started soon after and self-isolation requirements were imposed on arrivals to the island from several countries badly affected by the pandemic. On 23 February it was reported that 12 local patients had been tested with all results returning negative. On 25 February, a group of children at a local school were sent home to self-isolate after returning from a ski trip to northern Italy; one symptomatic student was tested but the result came back negative.

== Timeline of outbreak ==
=== March 2020 ===
The first confirmed case in Guernsey was identified on 9 March. The person had contracted the virus on holiday in Tenerife before returning home. The patient sought help promptly, and their family was placed in compulsory quarantine at home. Three days later, on 12 March, the island's most senior politician Gavin St Pier described the pandemic as "the most significant public health challenge since the end of the second world war". On 20 March, a second case was confirmed. The patient had returned from France before immediately entering a compulsory 14-day period of self-isolation during when they became symptomatic. Following the identification of a second case, further cases were quickly identified. A day later, on 21 March, fifteen new cases were confirmed in the space of 24 hours. On 22 March, three further cases were confirmed, as the States of Guernsey identified four clusters among ten cases; three groups were on separate ski trips to France and one group was on a ski trip in Austria and Germany. It was also announced that around 1000 people were in compulsory self-isolation, about 1.5% of the local population. On 23 March, no new cases were confirmed, and the States of Guernsey reaffirmed that a lockdown in the Bailiwick was not yet appropriate, warning of the likely economic and psychological consequences of such measures, and repeated the request for people to observe social distancing measures and practice good hygiene.

Highlighted in orange are the known sources of infection of COVID-19 cases confirmed in Guernsey

The first case confirmed to have been transmitted within the Bailiwick was identified on 24 March, as the local total rose by three to 23 confirmed cases. At 7pm, the States of Guernsey announced in a live broadcast that a lockdown period would begin from 00:01 on 25 March for two weeks during which restrictions would be placed on people's freedom of movement, enforceable by law. More cases continued to be identified as the total number of cases reached 60 on 30 March, by which date testing had begun in the Bailiwick of Guernsey, allowing results to be returned in less than 24 hours and prompting the adoption of a broader testing programme. The first COVID-19 related death in the Bailiwick was confirmed a day later; the individual was 80 years old and died in the afternoon on the day prior. Eighteen more cases were confirmed—the most in a day so far—bringing the total cases to 78, and at 16:00, Lieutenant Governor Vice Admiral Ian Corder, addressed the island, praising the 'discipline and stoicism' of islanders.

=== April to May 2020 ===
At the start of April, a number of cases were identified across two care homes. A second death was confirmed on 3 April as the cases surpassed one hundred, totalling 114. The number of recoveries was reported for the first time that day, at 13. Following a steady increase in cases, as well as two further deaths of individuals in their 80s, on 7 April the lockdown period was extended for another two weeks. On 9 April it was announced that at the two care homes confirmed to have been hit by the pandemic, 29 residents and 31 staff had tested positive. The next day, on 10 April, the total number of confirmed cases reached 200.

By 15 April, the number of confirmed cases stood at 228, rising by only 28 over the previous five days, prompting director of Public Health Dr. Brink to say the island was "starting to see a flattening of the curve" and that its position was "as good as can be expected" and that the success of the lockdown measures in reducing transmission had "exceeded" her expectations. On 17 April, the States expressed satisfaction that the "curve" had been flattened and announced the start of a phased resumption of business activity, which would eventually see a lifting of the lockdown restrictions, when appropriate. No new cases were found on 19 and 20 April, the first days without new cases since 19 March.

There were no new cases for seven consecutive days from the start of May, with the number of total cases stagnating at 252 and the number of active cases dropping to 15 as of 7 May; the number of deaths remained at 13 throughout this period also. By 11 May, the number of active cases had dropped to just 12. On 15 May, following fifteen consecutive days with no new deaths or cases, the CCA announced that the third phase of the lockdown exit strategy would begin from midnight the next day, a week earlier than anticipated. Following 22 days with no new cases or deaths, on 22 May the CCA announced that the start of phase four of the exit strategy would be brought forward to 30 May—six weeks earlier than initially forecast. On 27 May, the island's twenty-seventh successive day with no new cases, it was announced that there were no known active cases in the Bailiwick.

=== June to December 2020 ===
On 11 June, Dr. Brink revealed that extensive community testing had found no evidence of the virus in the Bailiwick, prompting the start of phase five of the lockdown exit strategy from 20 June.

Following 129 days with no active cases, on 7 September, a person on their seventh day of self-isolation after arriving from the UK tested positive for COVID-19. Several further isolated-arrivals tested positive in the following weeks, until on 20 October 2020 it was announced that a case with an 'unknown source' had been identified. By 23 October, a cluster of seven related cases were identified, and between 80 and 100 people had entered self-isolation as a result. Dr. Brink emphasised that the cluster was being "closed down" and that there was no evidence of widespread community seeding and St Pier's successor as Chief Minister, Peter Ferbrache, gave assurances that "life will continue as normal" and that Guernsey was "a long, long way" from reintroducing lockdown restrictions.

From late June and for the remainder of 2020, life within the Bailiwick returned almost entirely to normal with no restrictions on gatherings and no requirements for people to socially distance or use face coverings.

=== January to August 2021 ===
On 23 January 2021, it was announced that four cases were identified the previous evening, the sources of which were not known. None of the individuals had recently travelled outside the island and were not contacts of any known cases or recent arrivals. By 25 January 2021, the number of active cases on the island reached 52, 48 of which were identified as being related to the four cases identified two days earlier.

On 5 February 2021, the first positive case in Alderney was confirmed. As of 31 July 2021, 29 positive cases were reported in Alderney.

On 19 July 2021, a traveller in self-isolation was confirmed to be the first case in Sark.

On 14 August, a further two COVID-19 cases were confirmed in Sark.

== Overview of response ==
=== Strategy ===
As a self-governing jurisdiction not forming part of the UK, Guernsey independently co-ordinated its pandemic response in accordance with WHO guidelines. The underlying principle of the States of Guernsey's strategy to deal with the pandemic, as explained by Dr. Nicola Brink, the Director for Public Health, is to "test, trace, and quarantine", with the ultimate goal of "flattening the curve", which refers to decreasing the peak of the epidemic curve through a number of measures. This slowing of the rate of infection decreases the risk of health services being overwhelmed, allows for the better treatment of current cases, and delays additional cases until a vaccine become available. On 15 May, following fifteen days with no new cases and a clear flattening of the curve, Deputy Heidi Soulsby (President of the HSC) revealed that the island was in a position to pursue elimination of the virus (removing the presence of a virus from a specific geographical location) in the Bailiwick.

The response was led by the Civil Contingencies Authority (CCA), a senior cross-committee body made up of several committee Presidents and chaired by the head of the Policy and Resources Committee (P&R) (the island's most senior politician). The CCA is advised by the Policy and Resources Committee (the States of Guernsey's senior committee), the Committee for Health and Social Care (HSC), and Public Health Services (overseen by HSC). Under authority from the CCA, the HSC set the legal regulations and directions under which the Bailiwick has operated during the pandemic. The Coronavirus Political Executive Group was also established to include political representation from all principal States committees to make decisions on matters which do not engage the CCA.

=== Healthcare and treatment ===
The Committee for Health and Social Care announced, on 19 March, its plans for the island's only hospital—the Princess Elizabeth Hospital (PEH)—to respond to the development of the spread of COVID-19 on the island. Measures taken included the suspension of elective surgery from 23 March, training staff to "increase resilience in the provision of critical care", and limiting in-patients to one visitor at a time. On 23 March the States of Guernsey made the decision to close the hospital to visitors with exceptions for people in end of life care and occupants of the maternity and children's wards. In order to combat the pandemic, agency nurses due to return to the UK stayed in Guernsey to work the hospital.

On 27 March, the hospital's Day Care Unit completed its two-week conversion into an Intensive Care Unit (ICU) in preparation for accommodation potential coronavirus patients. It was also reported that Guernsey "started with more intensive care beds than the UK per head of population" and was "already in a good position for ventilators". On 27 March, the hospital adopted a new streaming system, whereby patients entering the Emergency Department must first meet with a streaming nurse who will question the patient about their travel history, self-isolation and possible contact with COVID-19-positive patients. All nurses and staff in the dedicated unit were required to wear protective equipment.

On 30 March, the medical director of Health and Social Care, Dr Peter Rabey, gave assurances that the Princess Elizabeth Hospital was "well prepared" for an increase in patients with COVID-19 and said that Guernsey had more ventilators per head of population than the UK. On 31 March, it was announced that patients going to the hospital presenting symptoms related to COVID-19 would not have to pay for a check-up nor pay for their treatment. On 2 April, it was announced that the Chest and Heart unit at the hospital would, from the next day, function as the designated doctors' surgery for anyone instructed to book an appointment after phoning their local surgery and presenting symptoms of an upper respiratory tract infection. On 5 April, it was announced that HSC would be spending between £15 million and £20 million to update the Princess Elizabeth Hospital's "ageing and increasingly vulnerable" health record system, expected to be installed over 18 months, to aid the response to COVID-19.

=== Economic support ===
On 19 March the States of Guernsey announced that it had made available a £5 million 'hardship fund' for any islanders (excluding those already eligible to receive national social security benefits) struggling financially from the impact of the pandemic. The States also set up a government-funded health insurance scheme to cover the medical bills of any Bailiwick residents who fall ill while visiting the UK, providing they can prove they cannot afford private health insurance. The States also announced on 23 March that it would be amending population law to protect non-residents who might find themselves without employment as a result of the pandemic and would otherwise be forced to leave the island.

On 24 March the Policy and Resources Committee announced two new schemes to support businesses and the self-employed, with both schemes totalling an estimated £41 million. The payroll co-sharing scheme—lasting for an initial period of 13 weeks—covered 80% of employee wages, based on the Guernsey minimum wage of £8.50 per hour (equating to £238 for a 35-hour week), with the remaining 20% expected to be covered by businesses themselves. The grants scheme allowed small businesses (of fewer than 10 people) and the self-employed to be awarded a £3000 grant to be utilised in "whichever way they deem appropriate". The committee predicted that around 1,700 businesses would qualify for the scheme with roughly 10,500 total employees. On 15 April, it was announced that the payroll support scheme would be extended to cover all businesses and self-employed persons, noting a gap in support for those persons in the initial scheme. It was reported that, as of that same day, £2.2 million had been shared amongst 700 businesses with many more applications awaiting processing.

On 19 March, the States of Guernsey also published advice to businesses including a number of financial 'easements' such as deferrals on social insurance payments and commercial tax on real property, and rent reliefs on government-owned property. On 20 March, the finalised emergency financial measures were approved including £30 million to support businesses, a £40 million loan guarantee scheme for locally-trading firms and a £25 million temporary overdraft for local airline Aurigny. On 24 March the Guernsey Financial Services Commission (GFSC) approved time extensions for businesses to file their financial returns in light of operational issues suffered as a result of the pandemic.

President of the Policy and Resources Committee, Gavin St Pier, confirmed on 27 March that local banks had been given flexibility by their regulator—the Bank of England—to give more loans to individuals and businesses and encouraged anyone in need to contact them and arrange a loan. On 30 March, a £40m loan guarantee scheme was launched by the States of Guernsey in partnership with the governments of the other Crown Dependencies of Jersey and the Isle of Man, and operated by Barclays, HSBC, Lloyds and RBSI and NatWest International, to provide further support for businesses. The scheme enables businesses to take out new loans and overdrafts of up to £500,000, with 80% of the total amount provided to be underwritten by the States of Guernsey.

On 15 April, a centralised COVID-19 Response Appeal was launched by the States of Guernsey to raise funds to support healthcare workers, those undergoing financial hardship, and for the provision of PPE. Another fund was also established by the States, and the two centralised funds and support appeals raised over £150,000. Another independent local fundraiser to support healthcare workers and community care staff generated over £4,000.

=== Testing and surveillance ===
Dr. Nicola Brink, the Director for Public Health, explained the process of dealing with suspected cases as follows: detection of a possible case; immediate quarantine; and contact tracing, to identify those at risk of transmission from that possible case and test, monitor and isolate them to stop the spread of the disease. Guernsey employed a high rate of testing, several times more per capita than many other jurisdictions. The testing process was described as 'quick and simple', with those unable to drive or be driven to the screening facility able to make arrangements to be tested at home. Those who were contacted directly by the States and ordered to self-isolate were subject to regular welfare checks, originally conducted by Public Health Services before being taken over by third sector volunteers. Positive cases were re-tested 14 days later or 48 hours after any symptoms had been resolved (whichever was latest). Acknowledging that there are various definitions of 'recovery' for the coronavirus, Dr. Brink clarified that the States of Guernsey were using "the virological definition with a repeat test on day 14 to show the virus has gone".

Without testing facilities available locally, samples were initially sent to be tested in the UK until the Bailiwick had developed its own. Due to the increased demand on UK laboratories to conduct tests, the time taken for results to be received was significantly increased on several occasions beyond the standard time of 48 hours. In a letter sent to the UK's Prime Minister, Boris Johnson, on 20 March, St Pier demanded a guarantee that testing support would be provided to the Crown Dependencies from the UK until Guernsey had established its own testing facility; the response from Johnson obliged, confirming that Colindale Public Health Laboratory would provide testing facilities until Guernsey could do so itself. On 30 March, it was announced that local testing facility was in use, meaning results would be available far quicker than tests conducted off-island. As a result, Public Health announced that from 31 March they will conduct a broader community testing programme, testing individuals with respiratory problems at local doctors' surgeries.

On 5 May, the States announced it would be allocating funds raised by the public through the local support appeal to purchase vital equipment in order to expand Guernsey's testing capacity up to around 400 tests per day. On 15 May, Dr. Brink revealed that the States had ordered 10,000 antibody testing kits recently approved by Public Health England, with the aim of expanding testing to anyone displaying relevant symptoms as well as known contacts of positive cases to potentially learn more about asymptomatic cases. In July, new equipment was ordered which, arriving in late September, would allow the island to conduct up to 2,000 tests per day.

Hospital workers were prioritised for testing should they display any of the relevant symptoms and that workers would be withdrawn from work if they were feeling even slightly unwell and rapidly tested. Dr. Brink also announced that once antibody testing—which can identify individuals immune to the disease—becomes available, hospital workers would again be prioritised.

=== Vaccination ===
The first batch of 975 doses of the Pfizer–BioNTech COVID-19 vaccine arrived in Guernsey on 12 December front-line workers and residential or care home staff started receiving their first dose of the vaccine on 17 December 2020. On 8 January 2021, it was announced that the States had set a target of 40,000 vaccinations by the end of March 2021, being 18,500 Pfizer and 22,000 AstraZeneca doses, with most to be administered at the Beau Sejour leisure centre.

== Timeline of response ==
=== February to March 2020: Early measures ===
On 6 February, the States of Guernsey published information advising islanders returning from Mainland China to self-isolate for 14 days upon their arrival in the Bailiwick "to reduce the risk of the infection being introduced to the island's community", referencing Public Health England's self-isolation guidelines. A day later, the States expanded the list of 'affected areas' from which return required self-isolation to include Mainland China, Hong Kong, Japan, Macau, Malaysia, the Republic of South Korea, Singapore, Taiwan, and Thailand. On 10 February, the States of Guernsey confirmed that seven local residents had been tested for the novel coronavirus, though asked that islanders "avoid speculation or worry". On 25 February, the States of Guernsey updated their self-islation information for returning residents, defining Group A and Group B areas. Residents returning from Group A areas (Mainland China, Iran, South Korea and some parts of Italy) were required to self-isolate for 14 days upon arrival, while those returning from Group B areas were required to self-isolate only if they had symptoms.

Early advice given to the public by the States of Guernsey, forming the foundations of the 'containment' phase of the response consisted of behaviour changing publicity encouraging hand-washing for at least twenty seconds, avoiding touching your own face, and practising respiratory hygiene as well as advising social distancing and keeping at least 2 metres (6.6 ft) from others, especially those showing symptoms. The States of Guernsey also published advice on supporting others in the community, encouraging the public to telephone elderly or vulnerable family members, friends and neighbours, offer to shop for those in self-isolation and to avoid non-essential off-island travel. The Health Improvement Commission also published advice and resources with guidance on exercises to keep families healthy and active during self-isolation, recommending two 20- to 30-minute sessions per day to maintain physical and mental wellbeing. They also clarified that while individuals may go outside to exercise alone while social distancing, they should stay at home where possible.

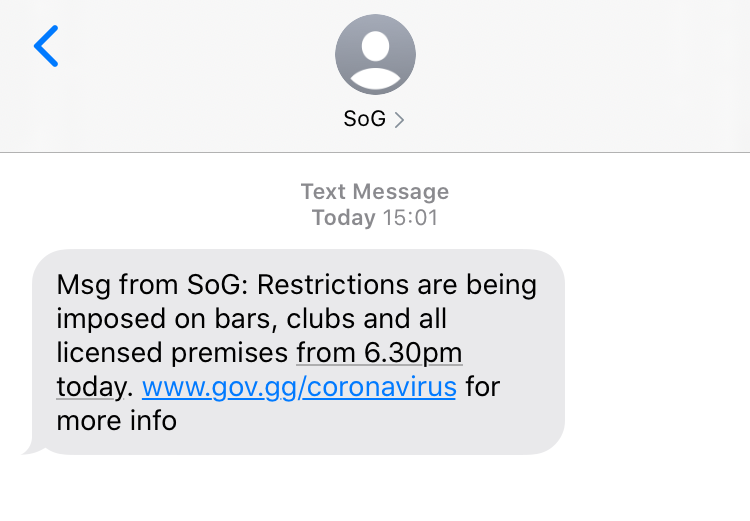
The States of Guernsey utilised technology to send mass SMS messages for the first time to provide regular updates on their response to the pandemic.

The first case in the Bailiwick was confirmed on 9 March, after which the CCA enacted the Emergency Powers (Coronavirus) (Bailiwick of Guernsey) Regulations 2020, coming into effect on 18 March: the first of a number of emergency powers regulations introduced in the States of Guernsey's response to the pandemic. The statutory instrument enables the Medical Officer of Health to implement emergency measures enforceable by law, the first of which mandated that anyone arriving in the Bailiwick from anywhere self-isolate for 14 days upon arrival from midnight on 19 March. The regulations also grant law enforcement officers power to detain individuals whom they suspect may have the coronavirus and present a risk of spreading it to others until the Medical Officer of Health can advise further. On 18 March the States utilised for the first time the databases of Sure, JT and Airtel-Vodafone to send a mass SMS message with information about self-isolation to numbers used in the Bailiwick. The technology is reserved for critical emergencies or public health threats.

On 20 March the States of Guernsey imposed restrictions on all bars, clubs and premises licensed to serve alcohol stipulating that all nightclubs and bars which do not serve hot food must close, and alcohol may only be served to seated customers at pubs and restaurants if it is ancillary to prepared or plated food. Deputy Gavin St Pier also urged both customers and licensees to respect the spirit, not the letter of the law, and not to look for ways around the restriction, advising those tempted to "Think again. Watch Netflix and get a takeaway". Restaurants and premises serving food as well as local gyms initially remained open for business subject to strict regulations ensuring customers were able to physically distance themselves from one another.

=== March to April 2020: First lockdown ===
Following the confirmation of a case resulting from on-island transmission on 24 March, the States of Guernsey announced in a live broadcast that it was implementing a 'lockdown' for an initial period of two weeks from 00:01 on 25 March, whereby restrictions would be placed on people's freedom of movement, enforceable under the statutory instrument, the Emergency Powers (Coronavirus) (Control of Events, Gatherings and Meetings) (Bailiwick of Guernsey) Regulations, 2020.

The measures require people to stay at home except for shopping for basic necessities, medical requirements, two hours of exercise per day, and travelling to and from work for 'essential' jobs which 'absolutely cannot be done from home'. Other measures include the closure of all non-essential shops, businesses and community spaces, and the banning of public gatherings of more than two people (excluding people from the same household). Weddings, baptisms and other religious ceremonies were also banned, while funerals would continue but with only immediate family permitted to attend. Gavin St Pier drew comparisons with the restrictions to those imposed during the occupation of the Channel Islands during world war two, commenting "These measures introduce the most far reaching deprivation of personal liberties since the second world war". On 29 March, the States of Guernsey issued detailed revisions to the lockdown measures for businesses and the self-employed following some confusion over which sectors were still able to work.

On 26 March, the States of Guernsey announced 'shielding' measures for extremely vulnerable individuals, advising them to stay at home for 12 weeks and minimise all physical contact with others. With the number of cases reaching 91 on 1 April, the response was reported to be moving to the 'delay' phase of the strategy. The States of Guernsey also clarified that leaving the house to escape domestic abuse was acceptable as it would be considered an essential reason, and published guidance for victims of domestic abuse and recommended an app which allows the user's smartphone to become a safety device, sending their location to designated contacts when activated by shaking the phone. St Pier also appealed for islanders to complete a voluntary online form in order to gather information on "how the community are feeling", and asked islanders to send questions to the States via email to be answered at the next press conference.

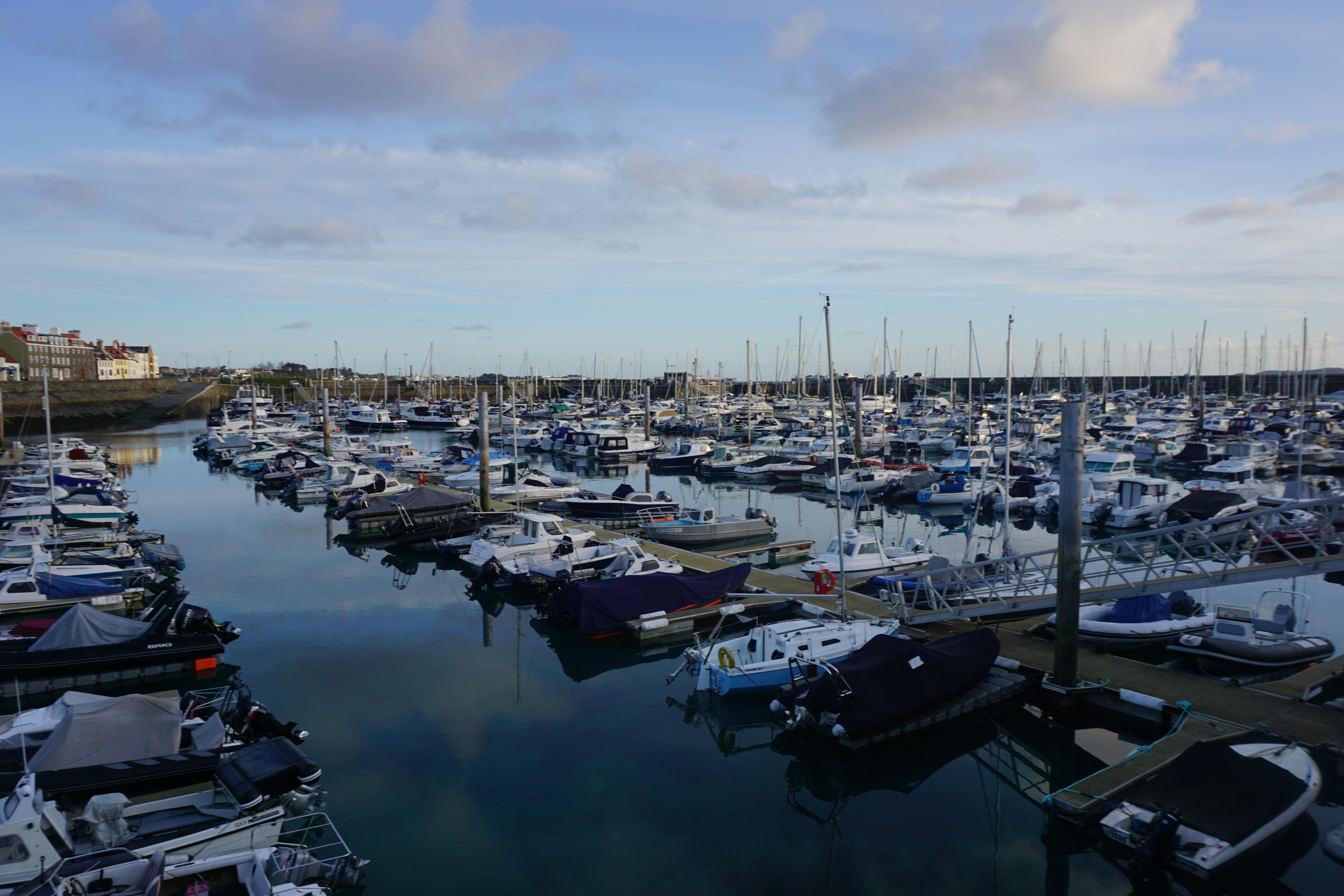
Pleasure boating was classed as a non-essential activity and therefore prohibited during the first lockdown.

On 2 April, the CCA approved several further emergency powers regulations, described by St Pier as being "largely designed to plan ahead to enable us to better manage issues that will emerge as a result of the need for us to all keep our distance from each other". They include regulations which modified certain requirements stipulated in the Mental Health (Bailiwick of Guernsey) Law 2010 per advice by the HSC following concerns over its functioning during the pandemic; Parochial matters regulations which enabled parishes to continue conducting business in the absence of ratepayers' meetings which are now impossible under lockdown restrictions; regulations which modified procedures in relation to deaths and cremations to prevent the spread of COVID-19; and regulations concerning the registration of health professionals which allowed HSC to temporarily hire retired or non-practising medical professionals (who would ordinarily be required to be registered in the UK) should they consider it necessary and proportionate to do so.

On 5 April, the Overseas Aid and Development Commission (OA&DC) (constituted as a committee of the States of Guernsey) agreed to suspend all grants anticipated for projects in 2021 in order to save and return over £1 million to the States of Guernsey to support the response to the pandemic. Following confirmation of two clusters of cases in separate care homes in Guernsey with tens of staff and residents being diagnosed with COVID-19, the States of Guernsey published an 'urgent public request' for former care home workers or volunteers to help out in care homes and community care facilities, as well as designating a separate programme designed specifically for responding to the pandemic within the care home sector in the Bailiwick.

=== April 2020 to January 2021: Phased release from lockdown ===
On 17 April, the CCA announced that it was satisfied that the curve had been flattened and revealed its plans for a phased resumption of business activity and exit from lockdown. The so-called 'exit strategy' is broken down into six phases, each with gradual easing of the restrictions on freedom of movement and on businesses and eventually a lifting of the stay-at-home order the implementation of an economic recovery plan. The strategy will be constantly monitored using testing, contact tracing and quarantine of potential patients alongside specific criteria which would trigger the reintroduction of lockdown measures if appropriate. Dr. Brink emphasised that the adaptive nature of the States of Guernsey's response would mean "slowly coming out of lockdown", and noted the success of the lockdown measures in reducing transmission in the Bailiwick, saying the situation was "as good as can be expected" and that it had "exceeded" her expectations. Following the early implementation of phase three, St Pier reaffirmed that the Bailiwick could progress through each phase quicker than expected should the island "maintain its success" in controlling and eliminating the disease.

==== 8 April to 19 June 2020: Phases 1–4 ====
On 7 April, the States of Guernsey confirmed in a live media briefing that the lockdown measures would remain in place for at least another 14 days, though changes were made to restrictions on businesses, taking effect from midnight on 8 April, to allow non-essential retailers to carry out home deliveries, providing strict social distancing and hygiene measures are followed and no more than two employees are on the premises; These changes were recognised as phase one of the phased lockdown exit strategy announced ten days later. Recognising the high proportion of deaths and cases coming from care homes across the island, the States decided on 9 April to stop all care home visits "for the foreseeable future". All hospital visits to COVID-19 wards or patients are not permitted, and hospices will stop routine visits; 'end of life' visits will be assessed individually. An expanded testing programme was implemented from 8 April also, which included wider criteria to allow for more people to be tested.

The second phase of the exit strategy was implemented from midnight on 25 April, permitting a limited set of businesses to re-open including gardening, building and other trades with no household contact, building wholesale and supply vehicle servicing, maintenance and repairs and property sales, rentals and business transactions. The relevant businesses may only re-open if they notify Environmental Health and operate in accordance with strict social distancing and hygiene measures, with Dr. Brink adding that it would "certainly not be business as usual" for those returning to work. More than 1,100 local businesses applied to re-open under the phase two restrictions. Further easing of lockdown restrictions as part of phase two were announced on 1 May, to take effect the next day, whereby households would be able to meet up with one other household, and congregate with those in that household, providing social distancing measures are observed. People were also permitted to partake in outdoor activities with one other person from outside their household, again only if social distancing measures are observed, which includes boating, fishing and personal training. Following seven consecutive days during which no new cases were identified, on 7 May the States brought forward an easement originally intended to be implemented in phase three by extending the daily exercise period from two hours to four.

The third phase was expected to begin once there had been a four-week period during which there are new threatening clusters, only a low number of new infections and hospital admissions remain stable or decline. However, following fifteen consecutive days with no new deaths or cases, on 15 May, the States of Guernsey decided to implement phase three from midnight the following day—a week earlier than previously anticipated. Eased restrictions in phase three allowed for food takeaway services to re-open, private prayer to be permitted at places of worship, indoor and building work within homes to recommence, and for some offices to be re-opened where remote work was not feasible. All, however, still require social distancing measures to be adhered to. Additionally, two household bubble (combined households as permitted in phase two) are allowed to merge to create a bigger four household bubble; households cannot change or swap households they have already joined with however.

By 22 May, the Bailiwick had gone twenty-two consecutive days with no new cases or deaths, prompting the HSC to announce the start of phase four from 30 May—six weeks earlier than previously expected. The changes to restrictions implemented in phase four will allow restaurants and cafes, hairdressers and beauticians, cinemas, gyms and sports venues to re-open in accordance with strict social distancing measures. Additionally, all schools are scheduled to re-open from 8 June, and the HSC said there would be a possibility of "some social gatherings" with "possible" restrictions on the number of people in attendance. Non-essential travel on and off island will also be permitted, but arrivals must still observe the 14 days self-isolation upon their return.

==== 20 June 2020 to 23 January 2021: Phase 5 ====
Phase five, nicknamed the 'Bailiwick bubble', began on 20 June. The announcement was made on 11 June, following 42 days with no new cases in the islands and Dr. Brink revealing that the extensive community testing programme had shown no evidence of the virus in the Bailiwick. In phase five, social distancing requirements have been lifted, allowing many business including pubs and restaurants to resume normal business activity at full capacity. Self-isolation restrictions remain in place for certain circumstances including those imposed on arrivals to the Bailiwick. Public venues and nightclubs are allowed to reopen, and contact sports are permitted, making the Bailiwick the first place in Britain to permit football, rugby and netball matches to take place. The strict border restrictions remain in place due to the continuing spread of the virus in surrounding jurisdictions.

Phase five was later split into three sub-phases. The second of these sub-phases, phase 5b, was introduced on 17 August 2020 with the implementation of Group A, B and C categorisation for countries to determine the rules applying to arrivals from those countries: Those travelling from a Group A country within the previous 14 days were required to isolate for 14 days; those travelling from a Group B country ere given the choice to isolate for just seven-days with a follow-up test before release; and those travelling from a Group C country were not required to isolate or be tested (this category was exclusively limited to countries that had established a direct 'air link' with the island).

Phase 5c came into effect on 28 October 2020, discarding the A, B and C country categorisation in favour of categories numbered 1 to 4. In this phase, anyone travelling to the Bailiwick is required to use the States of Guernsey's 'Travel Tracker', which requires all arrivals to the Bailiwick (excluding intra-island flights) to register and, dependent upon their recent travel history, undergo testing and isolate for either 7 or 14 days. On 23 December 2020, the CCA announced that 'exit tests' would be enforced for all arrivals to the Bailiwick on their thirteenth day of self-isolation. If this test is refused, those individuals will have their mandatory isolation period extended to 21 days. The new measures were implemented in response to a reportedly more transmissible variant of the virus being spread throughout the UK. In January 2021, tighter restrictions on arrivals were implemented, with prospective travellers needing to obtain an Essential Travel Permit ahead of their journey and local residents no longer having an automatic right to return.

=== January to March 2021: Second lockdown ===
On the morning of 23 January 2021, following the identification of four new cases with no known origin, the States of Guernsey released advice that all gatherings and events should be cancelled immediately and social-distancing measures should be observed. Care homes and the hospital were advised not to admit any visitors. A press conference was scheduled for noon that day, at which it was announced that a second lockdown order was to be imposed immediately, with nearly identical regulations and restrictions as the first lockdown, and with further guidance to be provided over the following few days. The lockdown was announced as being indefinite, with a first review after two weeks.

On 5 February 2021, it was confirmed that the lockdown would continue until at least 10 February, when an update would be provided on the plan to exit the second lockdown. Chief Minister Peter Ferbrache stated that he expected the lockdown to end "much quicker" than the first.

On 13 February 2021, legislation was announced to make the use of face masks mandatory in the Bailiwick on all public transport and in indoor public spaces.

On 22 March, Guernsey entered the third stage of its exit from the second lockdown, which comprised the lifting of all internal restrictions in the Bailiwick and a return to life as normal within the islands.

=== April 2021 onwards: Planned lifting of border restrictions ===
From 30 April, restrictions on non-essential travel were lifted, subject to restrictions based on the country or region from which a traveller is arriving. Travellers arriving from locations with fewer than 100 cases per 100,000 population are tested on arrival and day 7, between which they must self-isolate, before entering a phase of enhanced passive follow up protocols for a further 7 days.

From 14 May, less stringent arrival measures were introduced for arrivals from a 'Category 2' location, meaning those travelling from locations with fewer than 30 cases per 100,00 population who test negative on arrival do not have to self-isolate, but must conform with a passive follow up protocol, which includes restrictions on access to care homes and non-emergency hospital treatment.

From 1 July, borders reopened completely for the first time since March 2020, subject to Phase 1 of the vaccination programme being completed (both doses) and possible testing requirements or proof of vaccination.

== Reaction ==
Gary Burgess, a reporter for ITV News, reported that the States of Guernsey's response had been "held up by many as an exemplar of good communications during the coronavirus pandemic". Burgess highlighted in particular the clarity and sense of transparency in the response, citing the twice or thrice weekly press conferences given by senior figures of the CCA at which journalists may ask as many as questions as they wish on behalf of all islanders, the States of Guernsey publishing data on locations of outbreaks, numbers of patients being treated in hospital and the number of recoveries as well as insights into the extensive contact tracing process.

At the height of the lockdown restrictions imposed in March and April, a community movement began to display images and designs of rainbows displayed across the island as "a symbol positivity and hope".

Compliance with lockdown and isolation rules in the island was very high. By 30 June, out of a population of around 65,000, 59 people had been "given formal advice" by the police and 5 were recommended for prosecution of breach of emergency rules, a compliance to the lockdown rules of 99.9%.

In recognition of her role in co-ordinating the Bailiwick's response to the pandemic, Dr. Brink was appointed MBE in the Queen's 2020 Birthday Honours for services to public health in Guernsey.

== Impact ==
=== Economic impact ===
The pandemic and the measures taken to prevent its spread had a severe impact on both the local and global economy. Frequently described as an 'unprecedented' economic challenge to the Bailiwick, the initial economic downturn resulting from the pandemic and, in particular, the lockdown measures, was described as being worse than that seen during the 2008 financial crisis, triggering the COVID-19 recession. Island Global Research found that, across all three Crown Dependencies, 49% of professional services workers suffered a fall in demand or were forced to close entirely, while 12% reported increased demand. Additionally, 29% of economically active respondents in Guernsey had suffered a loss in work or worked fewer hours the week commencing 6 April. Modelling by the States of Guernsey suggested GDP losses of around £330 million over 2020—roughly 9% to 10% of the island's economy—and St Pier posited that without an economic recovery plan it could take around seven years for the economy to return to levels before the pandemic.

The States of Guernsey estimated the cost of the pandemic to the government in 2020 alone as being between £170 million and £190 million to account for lost government revenue, funding the various financial assistance support programmes and the increased expenditures to manage the crisis, and will likely have an impact in 2021 and beyond. Up to £100 million of that will potentially be covered by the island's sovereign wealth fund (a core investment reserve often referred to as the States' 'rainy day fund'), though St Pier revealed that the States' investments had suffered an 11% decline in the first quarter of 2020, and so they would not be liquidating investments until they had risen again in value. To provide liquidity and cash-flow, the Policy and Resources Committee would instead be seeking a loan of up to £500 million to cover lost income and business support while payments to the States are being deferred. At the 2020 budget announcement in November it was estimated that the island's government would be £120 million worse off than had been predicted for 2020.

Gavin St Pier distinguished the economic crisis triggered by the pandemic from that of 2007–08, arguing that the austerity approach adopted to recover from the recession a decade earlier would be inappropriate to respond to "a completely different economic experience" and instead suggested that significant financial investment and support from the States will be more effective to achieve "a V-shaped economic recovery and experience". Deputy Lyndon Trott said it was "critical" that the States of Guernsey borrow in order to finance its economic recovery strategy, positing that the alternative of austerity, spending cuts and tax increases "would prolong the recessionary period as well as hinder competitiveness and impact on hard-working people and families."

==== Consumer behaviour ====
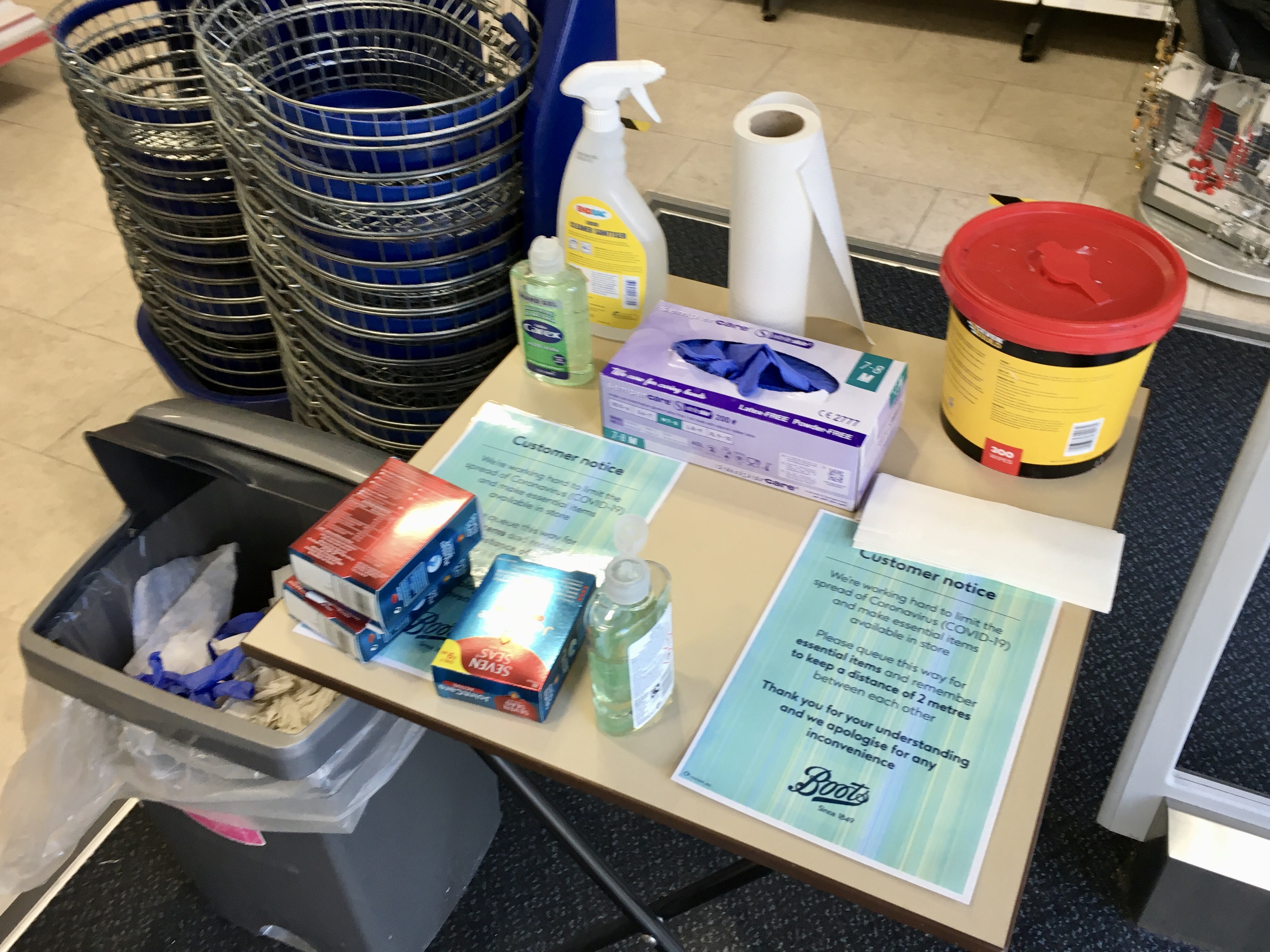
A table inside the entrance to Boots, in the high street, with hand sanitizer and disposable gloves which customers are required to use

In early March, some members of the public resorted to panic buying at supermarkets and food stores across the Bailiwick, resulting in long queues and shortages of toilet paper, pasta and fresh produce. Stores have limited the purchase of essential products to three items, placed security guards in aisles and used tape to enforce social distancing at tills. Addressing the public's panicked response, on 22 March the States of Guernsey gave assurances that the island has "no current issues with the supply of essential goods" and implored people to remain considerate of others and stop panic buying, telling those who continue to do so "to just get a grip and not be so selfish". Similarly, the States issued a statement requesting people stop stockpiling medicine following a surge in people buying painkillers and other medicine in bulk and reports of people pressuring pharmacists to dispense prescriptions in advance. A study by Island Global Research on the impact of the pandemic in the Crown Dependencies found that, for the week commencing 23 March 79% of respondents in Guernsey were able to get all or most of the essential grocery items they wanted when shopping.

On 2 April, Guernsey Electricity revealed that it had seen a 10% reduction in energy usage since the lockdown imposed on 25 March, describing the drop as 'remarkable' and citing the closure of businesses as well as an increase in temperatures as likely causes. With workers and families spending more time at home during lockdown (and the stages of phased release), the quantity of kerbside recycling increased by 30%, general household rubbish increased by 20%, while general waste collected from businesses was reduced by half. The States of Guernsey postulated that a near doubling in household glass recycling collected was indicative of islanders drinking more at home. On 21 May, the Channel Islands Co-op revealed that they had seen a reduction in people using their large stores during lockdown, following a brief period of business due to panic buying earlier on during the pandemic.

==== Employment ====
The pandemic and the measures implemented to prevent its spread significantly impacted work and employment in the Bailiwick, resulting in liquidations, unemployment and the furloughing of staff. In an open letter to islanders, Deputy Lyndon Trott cited forecasts suggesting up to 2,000 local workers could become unemployed.

Locally based company Specsavers—the largest private employer in the Bailiwick—announced on 2 April that it was anticipating cuts of 5% to company staff due to the significant impact of the pandemic on the company's sales and revenue, resulting in around 20 redundancies in Guernsey. On 6 April, Channel Island Lines announced that it was ceasing operations with immediate effect, rendering eighty people unemployed (including 12 in Guernsey). The company cited "very difficult trading conditions" caused by the pandemic as the reason for the collapse. On 15 April, local airline Aurigny announced it had furloughed 170 members of staff to 70% of their normal basic pay, and that retained staff had been asked to accept 80% of their previous pay. The measures were expected to save the company £450,000 per month. On 20 May, the CEO of Condor Ferries said there was a risk of "significant job redundancies" due to the pandemic.

On 1 April, it was confirmed that 1,100 people had enquired about the States of Guernsey hardship fund, with over 2000 emails requesting further information; the funds were intended to support those who have been made redundant, have a severely reduced household income, are unable to remote work and in mandatory self-isolation, or are unable to work because they are caring for a dependent child who cannot be otherwise cared for.

Due to the significant increase in demand for medical equipment, some local companies enjoyed a surge in business such as Intersurgical Guernsey, a local company which produces medical equipment essential for the treatment of patients with COVID-19, who increased their output by 36% from about 350,000 products a week to more than 500,000, and took on 12 extra staff including some who had previously been made redundant as a result of the pandemic.

==== Construction ====
On 12 April, it was reported that construction appeared to be the local industry worst-affected by the pandemic, producing over 600 claims for business support to the States of Guernsey financial support schemes. Speaking on behalf of the States, Paul Whitfield revealed plans to introduce when appropriate a "modicum of return to work in a safe way and still manage that curve" as part of the recovery strategy.

==== Finance ====
The financial sector—Guernsey's largest industry—was affected the least by the pandemic, with many staff able to remote work, though the vice-president of the Guernsey Chamber of Commerce, Elaine Gray, commented that the sector had suffered an immediate drop in cash flow and that there had still been redundancies and pay cuts across financial services businesses.

==== Food and hospitality ====
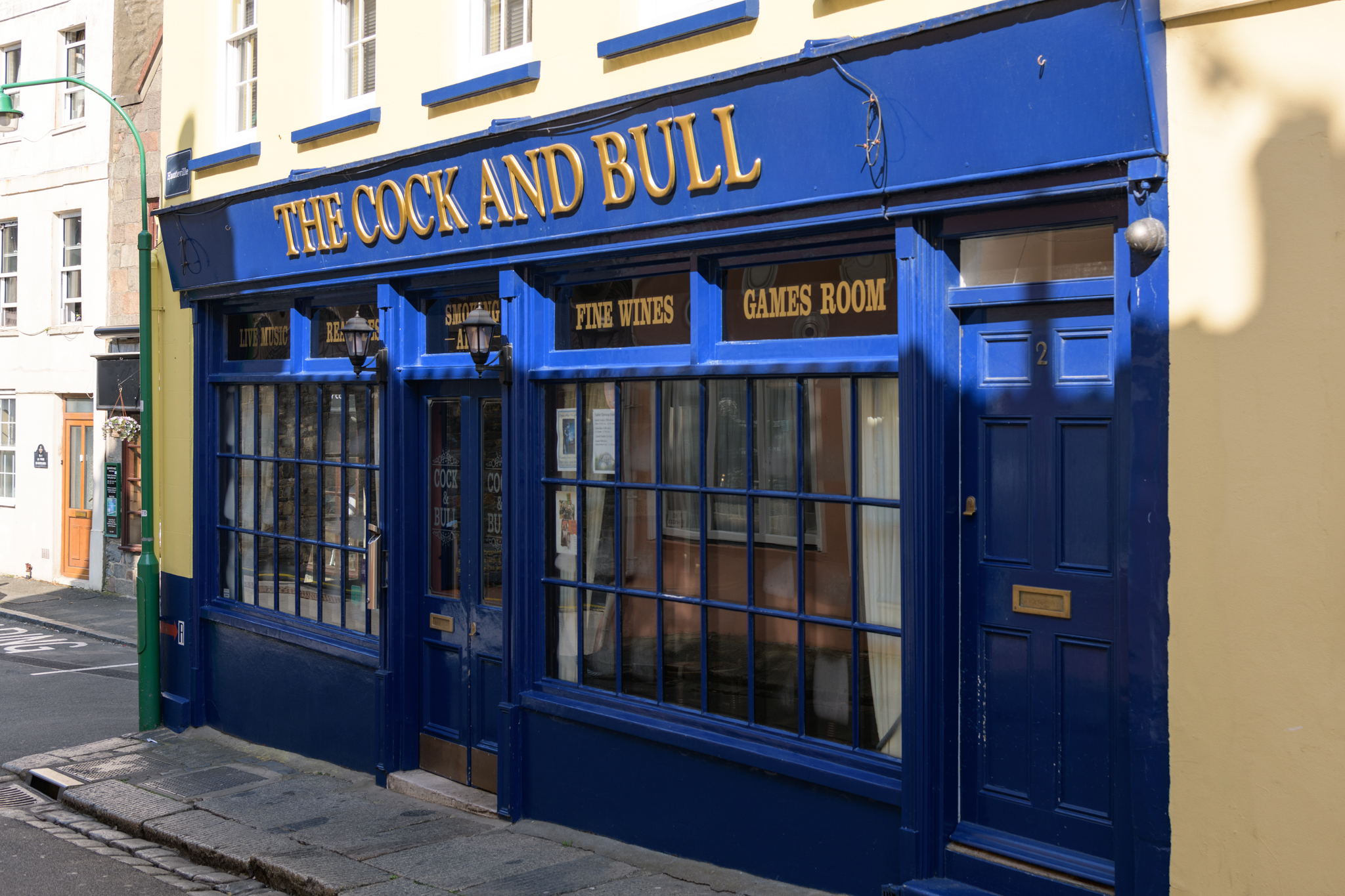
Local pubs and licensed premises not serving food (including the Cock and Bull, pictured) were forced to close on 20 March; all food-serving establishments were closed soon after.

Chief Executive Paul Whitfield described the hospitality industry as having suffered "significantly" as a result of the pandemic. On 23 March, Liberation Group—which owns a number of local pubs, bars and restaurants—closed all of its sites. On 29 March, following a clarification of the strict lockdown measures implemented four days prior, all restaurants, cafes and kiosks—many of which had made arrangements to provide food delivery services in order to stay open through the lockdown—were ordered to shut. On 15 May, the Guernsey Press reported that hoteliers were expecting their worst financial year since the occupation.

==== Retail ====
On 31 March, Sandpiper CI—Guernsey's largest retailer—announced that its purchase of the Guernsey Pub Company, owners of Randalls Brewery, had fallen through due to the impact of the pandemic, with the sale and purchase agreement terminating on 1 April.

==== Property market ====
It was reported on 6 April that property sales and lettings had not "dramatically dropped", and that despite house viewings including those by surveyors and conveyancers being cancelled due to the lockdown measures, estate agents were remaining optimistic while it was too early to estimate the impact of the pandemic on property in Guernsey.

==== Tourism ====
Tourism and visitors, another large part of Guernsey's economy, was significantly impacted by the pandemic. On 11 March it was announced that Guernsey Harbours had cancelled the arrival of a cruise ship scheduled to arrive on 20 March as a precautionary measure. Subsequently, on 19 March individual operators cancelled all cruise trips until the start of May, including nine scheduled to visit the island in April and three in May.

=== Political impact ===
The pandemic resulted in changes to the usual functioning of the States of Guernsey, with the CCA being given power to independently enact emergency legislation to co-ordinate and enforce the response strategy. As a result, there were several concerns over a lack of scrutiny of decisions being made by the CCA—a body designed for "short-term emergencies"—due to the States of Deliberation not sitting as normal, prompting the States to consider temporary changes to its system of government. The matter was resolved on 14 April when the States of Deliberation met virtually to vote retrospectively on the various emergency powers legislation enacted by the CCA, all of which were approved. In another virtual meeting on 15 April, the States of Deliberation decided to postpone Guernsey's first island-wide election, planned to take place in June 2020, until June 2021. The election was later brought forward to October 2020.

=== Social impact ===
==== Crime ====
Guernsey Police revealed that there was an overall reduction in the number of crimes reported and committed during the lockdown period, though there have been a number of people arrested for traffic offences. However, there were a higher number of domestic abuse incidents in Guernsey since the implementation of lockdown restrictions, accompanied by more calls to the police and domestic abuse charities; Guernsey Police consistently clarified that leaving the house to escape domestic abuse constitutes an essential journey. On 3 April, a woman of Asian descent was verbally racially abused by a man in a car park at a Waitrose store on the Rohais.

==== Events ====
Following government advice on social distancing and limiting contact with others, a number of local events were cancelled or postponed including Liberation Day celebrations and the Guernsey Literary festival. On 20 May, organisers confirmed that Sark's annual sheep racing weekend was cancelled due to the pandemic.

A study by Island Global Research on the impact of the pandemic in the Crown Dependencies found that, for the week commencing 23 March 87% of respondents in Guernsey were forced to postpone or cancel social plans or events due to the pandemic. Following churches across the island being closed, effectively cancelling weekly congregations, BBC Radio Guernsey announced that it would be hosting wireless congregations every Sunday. On 23 March the Royal Court issued several changes to its procedures in response to the pandemic to allow for social distancing measures. A 'basic provision' of marriage services was provided.

==== Education ====
The pandemic resulted, temporarily, in the near-total closure of schools in the Bailiwick, as happened to educational systems worldwide. On 19 March, Public Health announced that all schools in the Bailiwick would be closed from 23 March until at least the end of the Easter break, with the intention to re-open once on-island testing was introduced, but this was later extended to 31 May (though the decision would be subject to constant review). Exceptions were made for children whose parents were categorised as critical workers as well as children and young people with special educational needs who were allowed to attend school providing social distancing measures were observed. St Pier said that the measures predicted between 10% and 15% of children would continue to attend schools during the temporary stoppage of education. On 7 April it was announced that 126 children and young people were being looked after at school.

The closure of schools due to the pandemic resulted in further disruptions to education including changes to exam procedures, delays to results and the confirmation of academic places, as well as the relocation of students studying abroad. Confirmations of primary and secondary school places, normally sent out before the end of the spring term, were delayed, and A-level and GCSE students, being unable to sit exams due to the pandemic, will be assigned their 'most likely' grade by teachers in accordance with guidance from exam regulator Ofqual. Students studying in the UK or abroad were advised to return to the island "sooner rather than later" amidst many universities and educational institutions closing due to the pandemic, asking in a statement on 17 March that students consider coming home "even if this requires a period of self-isolation".

On 15 May, it was announced that primary schools would re-open from 8 June. Half of the students will attend on Monday and Tuesday and the other half on Thursday and Friday, with Wednesday being used to deep clean the school to prevent the spread of the virus. Secondary schools, however, remained closed.

==== Mental health ====
Concerns were raised about the impact of the pandemic on mental health in the Bailiwick, especially amongst young people and care workers. A study focusing on mental health and wellbeing found that the number of people claiming to be 'thriving' had dropped from 72% at the start of 2020 to just 25% by mid-April. It has been speculated that some people who normally experience high levels of anxiety actually had a more positive experience during lockdown, but that the return to normality after lockdown could bring increased anxiety following a period of reduced social contact.

==== Sport ====
The impact of the pandemic significantly affected sport on the island. Event cancellations include the Guernsey Marathon and the Muratti Vase semi-final. Guernsey F.C.'s season was cut short when all remaining 2019–20 Isthmian League fixtures were cancelled and the season voided, while the Guernsey Raiders, who led the London & South East Premier when the division was ended prematurely due to the pandemic, were granted promotion to National League 2 South for the following season. The 2020 edition of the Siam Cup—the annual rugby contest between Guernsey and Jersey and the second-oldest rugby trophy in existence—would be played in May 2021.

==== Transportation ====
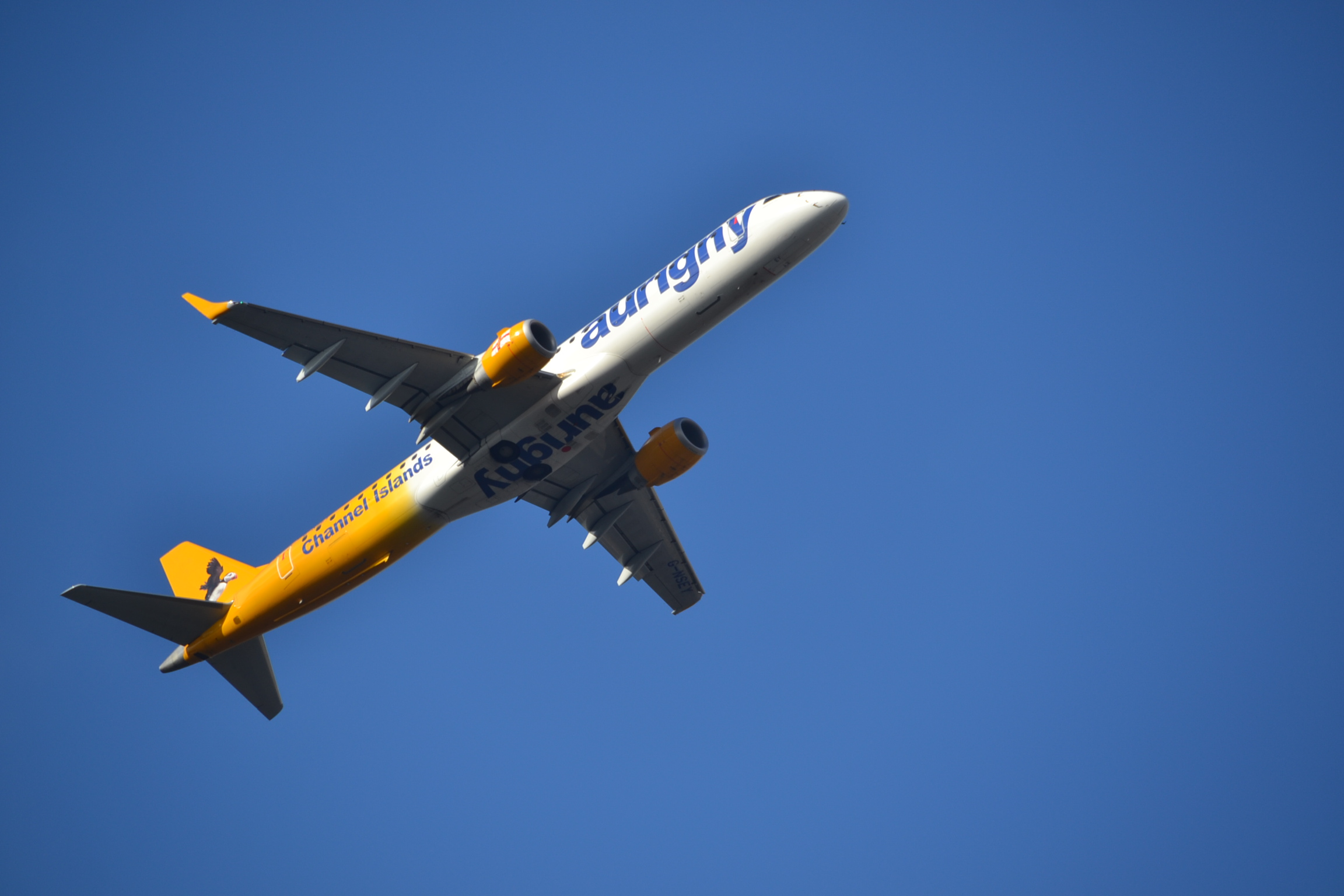
Local airline Aurigny significantly reduced its schedule due to a reduction in demand, in-part due to government advice against non-essential travel.

On 21 March 2020 it was announced that, following directives from the States of Guernsey, no boats were permitted to land on Herm from outside the Bailiwick until at least the end of April 2020.

On 23 March 2020 Sark Shipping suspended all passenger boats to Sark from St. Peter Port. After Sark residents had the opportunity to be repatriated on about a dozen repatriation sailings, it was announced that from 30 March 2021 just three freight-only services a week would be operated to Sark.

On 18 March, local airline Blue Islands offered citizens repatriation flights before the islands passed the isolation deadline; two days later, on 20 March, the airline announced it was stopping all flights out of Guernsey due to lack of demand.

On 19 March, local airline Aurigny announced changes to its scheduling which included a reduction in services between some destinations and a suspension of other routes entirely, initially planned to run until 19 April. The airline said the aim of the reduced schedule was to "reduce costs in this unprecedented period of low demand" and said they hoped to return to their regular schedule for summer. On 25 March, Aurigny announced a severely reduced schedule available only to customers with an essential reason for travelling.

On 3 April, Aurigny announced it would be suspending all flights to and from Gatwick Airport from 6 April until the end of May. This was extended on 15 May until the end of August, with suspensions on flights to all destinations other than an emergency route to Southampton.

On 10 April, it was reported that Guernsey Airport would no longer open on Saturdays until the end of May 2020.

On 12 May Condor Ferries announced that there would be no passenger ferries until at least 12 June.

On 25 June it was announced that an "air-bridge" would open in July to allow travel between the Isle of Man and Guernsey without quarantine restrictions.

== Other responses ==
Airtel-Vodafone announced on 20 March that it had increased customers' data allowance to 50GB for an initial one-month period to support those remote working during the COVID-19 pandemic. Sure also announced it would be offering free upgrades to customers' broadband speeds lasting until July.

On 31 March, Rubis announced that it would be offering free fuel to all frontline hospital workers at hospitals across the Channel Islands. Workers will be able to claim a fuel voucher which may be used at any Rubis forecourt.

== Public perception ==
On 7 April, it was reported that a study conducted by Island Global Research found that 77% of islanders perceived the threat from the pandemic as high or very high. The study also revealed that around 25% of under-30s believed the pandemic posed a high or very high threat to them compared to around 50% people aged over 70, and that, in general, people perceive the threat of the pandemic to be greater for family members than for themselves, especially those living in the UK instead of in Guernsey.

== Statistics ==
=== Testing results ===
As of 15 February 2021, 55,578 samples have been tested, (Note: This figure "relates to all the sampling and testing activity associated with finding out if a person is positive or negative during 'one testing episode'", meaning it only counts the first sample taken from an individual and not subsequent samples taken to identify whether or not that individual has recovered.) yielding 801 positive results and 54,450 negative results with 327 results yet to be confirmed. 611 confirmed cases have been reported as recovered following negative test results for patients who had previously tested positive, and there are 176 active (known) cases.

New cases by day reported

View source data.

Recoveries by day reported

View source data.

Active and confirmed cases

The graph below shows the total active cases per day and the cumulative total number of cases since 9 March 2020.

View source data.

=== Deaths ===
The States of Guernsey has recorded 14 deaths (13 in the first wave and 1 in the second wave) of people confirmed to be as a result COVID-19. Also identified has been 1 patient confirmed to have COVID-19 who died of a different cause and 3 further 'presumptive' deaths – deaths of persons not tested but believed to have died from COVID-19. Only 2 deaths have occurred in hospital and all but one have been residents at local care homes.

=== Vaccinations ===
The graph below shows the total number of vaccination doses administered since 17 December 2020, when the States began to administer the available vaccines.

View source data.

=== First wave analysis ===
==== Case grouping ====
Grouping of confirmed COVID-19 cases in April 2020
Grouping	% of confirmed cases
Care homes	42
Staff	23
Residents	19
Contacts of known cases	27
Travel	19
Unknown community source	12

Of the 252 cases confirmed as of 11 May 37% were among males and 63% were among females, with ages ranging from 0 to 99 years old. 96% of infected persons are aged 18 and over and 4% are under 18. The States of Guernsey have identified the UK, France, Tenerife, mainland Spain, Germany, Austria, Switzerland and Jersey as well as local transmissions, as sources of the infection in the Bailiwick.

The largest grouping of cases has resulted from several clusters identified in local care homes, with residents and staff at the homes accounting for over 40% of all confirmed cases in the Bailiwick. By contrast, the smallest grouping of cases has been those arising from an unknown community source (one with no traceable link to a known case or cluster of cases) at 12%.

The chart below shows the grouping of active cases confirmed during the first wave of the outbreak from 6 March 2020 up to 29 May 2020 recorded by date of diagnosis. Active cases refers to the total number of confirmed cases minus recovered and deceased cases. Recovery is defined using the virological definition, meaning the person is re-tested and found to have no virus detectable on their nose or throat swab on day 14 (or later if a person is still symptomatic on day 14).

View source data.

==== Demographics ====
The breakdown of the gender of cases during the first wave, by age, is as follows:

View source data.

=== Complete statistics ===
==== 2020 ====
March–April
Date	Positive results		Confirmed deaths		Samples taken		Confirmed recoveries	
Date	New	Total	New	Total	New	Total	New	Total
9 Mar	1	1	0	0	–	84	–	–
⋮	No new cases							
20 Mar	1	2	0	0	45	273	–	–
21 Mar	15	17	0	0	26	299	–	–
22 Mar	3	20	0	0	42	341	–	–
23 Mar	0	20	0	0	28	369	–	–
24 Mar	3	23	0	0	29	398	–	–
25 Mar	7	30	0	0	43	441	–	–
26 Mar	4	34	0	0	6	447	–	–
27 Mar	2	36	0	0	25	472	–	–
28 Mar	3	39	0	0	37	509	–	–
29 Mar	6	45	0	0	28	537	–	–
30 Mar	15	60	0	0	54	591	–	–
31 Mar	18	78	1	1	117	708	–	–
1 Apr	13	91	0	1	41	749	–	–
2 Apr	6	97	0	1	62	811	–	–
3 Apr	17	114	1	2	99	910	13	13
4 Apr	22	136	0	2	81	991	2	15
5 Apr	18	154	1	3	118	1,109	12	27
6 Apr	11	165	1	4	48	1,157	1	28
7 Apr	1	166	0	4	17	1,174	6	34
8 Apr	15	181	1	5	113	1,287	4	38
9 Apr	10	191	0	5	210	1,497	2	40
10 Apr	9	200	1	6	81	1,578	2	42
11 Apr	9	209	0	6	58	1,636	6	48
12 Apr	9	218	0	6	83	1,719	0	48
13 Apr	1	219	0	6	54	1,773	5	53
14 Apr	4	223	1	7	62	1,835	0	53
15 Apr	5	228	1	8	137	1,972	16	69
16 Apr	6	234	1	9	142	2,114	4	73
17 Apr	2	236	0	9	109	2,223	9	82
18 Apr	3	239	0	9	97	2,320	5	87
19 Apr	0	239	0	9	127	2,447	10	97
20 Apr	0	239	1	10	44	2,491	15	112
21 Apr	2	241	0	10	70	2,561	11	123
22 Apr	2	243	0	10	74	2,635	11	134
23 Apr	2	245	0	10	92	2,727	5	139
24 Apr	0	245	1	11	69	2,796	16	155
25 Apr	0	245	1	12	68	2,864	12	167
26 Apr	2	247	1	13	77	2,941	4	171
27 Apr	0	247	0	13	57	2,998	11	182
28 Apr	0	247	0	13	16	3,014	9	191
29 Apr	4	251	0	13	113	3,127	5	196
30 Apr	0	251	0	13	52	3,179	6	202

May–August
Date	Positive results		Confirmed deaths		Samples taken		Confirmed recoveries	
Date	New	Total	New	Total	New	Total	New	Total
1 May	1	252	0	13	91	3,270	7	209
2 May	0	252	0	13	102	3,372	8	217
3 May	0	252	0	13	32	3,404	0	217
4 May	0	252	0	13	17	3,421	0	217
5 May	0	252	0	13	44	3,465	5	222
6 May	0	252	0	13	71	3,536	0	222
7 May	0	252	0	13	52	3,588	1	223
8 May	0	252	0	13	64	3,652	2	225
9 May	0	252	0	13	26	3,678	1	226
10 May	0	252	0	13	30	3,708	0	226
11 May	0	252	0	13	44	3,752	0	226
12 May	0	252	0	13	55	3,807	3	229
13 May	0	252	0	13	73	3,880	1	230
14 May	0	252	0	13	63	3,943	0	230
15 May	0	252	0	13	92	4,035	1	231
16 May	0	252	0	13	57	4,092	1	232
17 May	0	252	0	13	29	4,121	1	233
18 May	0	252	0	13	7	4,128	1	234
19 May	0	252	0	13	65	4,193	1	235
20 May	0	252	0	13	53	4,246	1	236
21 May	0	252	0	13	88	4,334	0	236
22 May	0	252	0	13	59	4,393	0	236
23 May	0	252	0	13	131	4,524	0	236
24 May	0	252	0	13	12	4,536	0	237
25 May	0	252	0	13	42	4,578	0	237
26 May	0	252	0	13	43	4,621	0	237
27 May	0	252	0	13	73	4,694	1	238
28 May	0	252	0	13	111	4,805	0	238
29 May	0	252	0	13	116	4,921	0	238
30 May	0	252	0	13	109	5,030	0	238
31 May	0	252	0	13	29	5,059	0	238
1 Jun	0	252	0	13	30	5,089	0	238
2 Jun	0	252	0	13	49	5,138	0	238
3 Jun	0	252	0	13	95	5,233	0	238
4 Jun	0	252	0	13	45	5,278	0	238
5 Jun	0	252	0	13	121	5,399	0	238
6 Jun	0	252	0	13	20	5,419	0	238
7 Jun	0	252	0	13	48	5,467	0	238
8 Jun	0	252	0	13			0	238
9 Jun	0	252	0	13			0	238
10 Jun	0	252	0	13			0	238
11 Jun	0	252	0	13		5,695	0	238
12 Jun	0	252	0	13			0	238
13 Jun	0	252	0	13			0	238
14 Jun	0	252	0	13			0	238
15 Jun	0	252	0	13			0	238
16 Jun	0	252	0	13			0	238
17 Jun	0	252	0	13			0	238
18 Jun	0	252	0	13			0	238
19 Jun	0	252	0	13		6,051	0	238
20 Jun	0	252	0	13			0	238
21 Jun	0	252	0	13			0	238
22 Jun	0	252	0	13			0	238
23 Jun	0	252	0	13			0	238
24 Jun	0	252	0	13			0	238
25 Jun	0	252	0	13			0	238
26 Jun	0	252	0	13		6,269	0	238
27 Jun	0	252	0	13			0	238
28 Jun	0	252	0	13			0	238
29 Jun	0	252	0	13			0	238
30 Jun	0	252	0	13			0	238
1 Jul	0	252	0	13		6,462	0	238
2 Jul	0	252	0	13			0	238
3 Jul	0	252	0	13			0	238
4 Jul	0	252	0	13			0	238
5 Jul	0	252	0	13			0	238
6 Jul	0	252	0	13			0	238
7 Jul	0	252	0	13			0	238
8 Jul	0	252	0	13		6,604	0	238
9 Jul	0	252	0	13			0	238
10 Jul	0	252	0	13			0	238
11 Jul	0	252	0	13			0	238
12 Jul	0	252	0	13			0	238
13 Jul	0	252	0	13			0	238
14 Jul	0	252	0	13			0	238
15 Jul	0	252	0	13			0	238
16 Jul	0	252	0	13			0	238
17 Jul	0	252	0	13			0	238
18 Jul	0	252	0	13			0	238
19 Jul	0	252	0	13		7,587	0	238
20 Jul	0	252	0	13			0	238
21 Jul	0	252	0	13			0	238
22 Jul	0	252	0	13			0	238
23 Jul	0	252	0	13			0	238
24 Jul	0	252	0	13			0	238
25 Jul	0	252	0	13			0	238
26 Jul	0	252	0	13			0	238
27 Jul	0	252	0	13			0	238
28 Jul	0	252	0	13			0	238
29 Jul	0	252	0	13			0	238
30 Jul	0	252	0	13			0	238
31 Jul	0	252	0	13		8,321	0	238
1 Aug	0	252	0	13			0	238
2 Aug	0	252	0	13			0	238
3 Aug	0	252	0	13			0	238
4 Aug	0	252	0	13			0	238
5 Aug	0	252	0	13			0	238
6 Aug	0	252	0	13			0	238
7 Aug	0	252	0	13			0	238
8 Aug	0	252	0	13			0	238
9 Aug	0	252	0	13			0	238
10 Aug	0	252	0	13			0	238
11 Aug	0	252	0	13			0	238
12 Aug	0	252	0	13			0	238
13 Aug	0	252	0	13			0	238
14 Aug	0	252	0	13			0	238
15 Aug	0	252	0	13			0	238
16 Aug	0	252	0	13			0	238
17 Aug	0	252	0	13			0	238
18 Aug	0	252	0	13			0	238
19 Aug	0	252	0	13			0	238
20 Aug	0	252	0	13			0	238
21 Aug	0	252	0	13			0	238
22 Aug	0	252	0	13			0	238
23 Aug	0	252	0	13			0	238
24 Aug	0	252	0	13			0	238
25 Aug	0	252	0	13			0	238
26 Aug	0	252	0	13			0	238
27 Aug	0	252	0	13			0	238
28 Aug	0	252	0	13			0	238
29 Aug	0	252	0	13			0	238
30 Aug	0	252	0	13			0	238
31 Aug	0	252	0	13			0	238

September–December
Date	Positive results		Confirmed deaths		Samples taken		Confirmed recoveries	
Date	New	Total	New	Total	New	Total	New	Total
1 Sep	0	252	0	13			0	238
2 Sep	0	252	0	13			0	238
3 Sep	0	252	0	13			0	238
4 Sep	0	252	0	13		11,326	0	238
5 Sep	0	252	0	13			0	238
6 Sep	0	252	0	13			0	238
7 Sep	1	253	0	13		11,649	0	238
8 Sep	0	253	0	13	174	11,823	0	238
9 Sep	0	253	0	13			0	238
10 Sep	0	253	0	13			0	238
11 Sep	0	253	0	13			0	238
12 Sep	0	253	0	13			0	238
13 Sep	0	253	0	13			0	238
14 Sep	0	253	0	13			0	238
15 Sep	0	253	0	13			0	238
16 Sep	0	253	0	13			0	238
17 Sep	0	253	0	13			1	239
18 Sep	1	254	0	13		13,120	0	239
19 Sep	0	254	0	13			0	239
20 Sep	1	255	0	13		13,288	0	239
21 Sep	1	256	0	13	179	13,467	0	239
22 Sep	0	256	0	13	102	13,569	0	239
23 Sep	0	256	0	13			0	239
24 Sep	0	256	0	13			0	239
25 Sep	0	256	0	13			1	240
26 Sep	0	256	0	13			0	240
27 Sep	0	256	0	13			0	240
28 Sep	0	256	0	13			0	240
29 Sep	0	256	0	13			0	240
30 Sep	0	256	0	13			2	242
1 Oct	0	256	0	13			0	242
2 Oct	0	256	0	13			0	242
3 Oct	1	257	0	13			0	242
4 Oct	0	257	0	13			0	242
5 Oct	0	257	0	13			0	242
6 Oct	0	257	0	13			0	242
7 Oct	0	257	0	13			0	242
8 Oct	1	258	0	13			1	243
9 Oct	0	258	0	13			0	243
10 Oct	0	258	0	13			0	243
11 Oct	0	258	0	13			0	243
12 Oct	0	258	0	13			0	243
13 Oct	0	258	0	13			0	243
14 Oct	0	258	0	13		16,701	0	243
15 Oct	0	258	0	13	280	16,981	0	243
16 Oct	0	258	0	13	266	17,247	1	244
17 Oct	0	258	0	13	40	17,287	0	244
18 Oct	0	258	0	13			0	244
19 Oct	0	258	0	13		17,489	1	245
20 Oct	1	259	0	13	74	17,573	0	245
21 Oct	1	260	0	13	225	17,798	0	245
22 Oct	2	262	0	13	324	18,122	0	245
23 Oct	3	265	0	13	373	18,495	0	245
24 Oct	0	265	0	13	115	18,610	0	245
25 Oct	0	265	0	13	195	18,805	0	245
26 Oct	1	266	0	13	127	18,932	0	245
27 Oct	0	266	0	13	104	19,036	0	245
28 Oct	1	267	0	13	184	19,220	0	245
29 Oct	0	267	0	13	140	19,360	0	245
30 Oct	0	267	0	13	256	19,616	0	245
31 Oct	1	268	0	13	157	19,773	0	245
1 Nov	2	270	0	13	70	19,843	1	246
2 Nov	1	271	0	13	150	19,993	0	246
3 Nov	1	272	0	13	139	20,132	0	246
4 Nov	1	273	0	13	322	20,454	1	247
5 Nov	1	274	0	13	327	20,781	2	249
6 Nov	4	278	0	13	199	20,980	1	250
7 Nov	1	279	0	13	208	21,188	0	250
1 Dec		287	0	13			0	270
2 Dec		287	0	13		25,154	1	271
7 Dec		288	0	13		26,507		271
12 Dec		289	0	13		27,595		275
17 Dec		291	0	13		28,752		275
23 Dec		297	0	13		30,057		276
25 Dec		297	0	13		30,479		278
31 Dec		298	0	13		31,359		278

==== 2021 ====
January–
Date	Positive results		Confirmed deaths		Samples taken		Confirmed recoveries		Total vaccinations administered	
Date	New	Total	New	Total	New	Total	New	Total	1st dose	2nd dose
1 Jan	1	299	0	13			1	279		
2 Jan	0	299	0	13			0	279		
3 Jan	1	300	0	13			0	279		
4 Jan	0	300	0	13			0	279		
5 Jan	0	301	0	13			4	283		
6 Jan	1	302	0	13			0	283		
7 Jan	0	302	0	13			1	284		
8 Jan	0	302	0	13			0	284		
9 Jan	2	304	0	13			0	284	1,661	
10 Jan	1	305	0	13			0	284		
11 Jan	1	306	0	13			0	284		
12 Jan	1	307	0	13			0	284		
13 Jan	1	308	0	13			3	287		
14 Jan	0	308	0	13			0	287		
15 Jan	1	309	0	13			1	288		
16 Jan	0	309	0	13			0	288	4,121	519
17 Jan	0	309	0	13			1	288		
18 Jan	0	309	0	13			1	289		
19 Jan	0	309	0	13			0	289		
20 Jan	1	310	0	13			0	289		
21 Jan	0	310	0	13			1	290		
22 Jan	0	310	0	13			1	291		
23 Jan	4	314	0	13			0	291		
24 Jan	7	321	0	13		37,062	2	293	6,151	522
25 Jan	38	359	0	13	526	37,588	1	294		
26 Jan	10	369	0	13	645	38,233	0	294		
27 Jan	22	391	0	13	863	39,096	0	294		
28 Jan	23	414	0	13	835	39,931	0	294		
29 Jan	35	449	0	13	1,029	40,960	0	294		
30 Jan	44	493	0	13	657	41,617	0	294		
31 Jan	46	539	0	13	781	42,398	1	295		
1 Feb	46	585	0	13	779	43,177	0	295		
2 Feb	30	615	0	13	839	44,016	1	296		
3 Feb	36	651	0	13	942	44,958	13	309		
4 Feb	21	672	0	13	999	45,957	4	313		
5 Feb	17	689	0	13	1,138	47,095	2	315		
6 Feb	22	711	0	13	1,115	48,210	15	330		
7 Feb	9	720	0	13	802	49,012	15	345	12,045	3,090
8 Feb	21	741	0	13	604	49,616	17	362		
9 Feb	11	752	0	13	687	50,303	21	383		
10 Feb	8	760	0	13			28	411		
11 Feb	10	770	0	13		51,897	41	452		
12 Feb	12	782	0	13	937	52,834	30	482		
13 Feb	7	789	0	13			52	534		
14 Feb	8	797	0	13		54,711	48	582	13,950	5,334
15 Feb	4	801	1	14	867	55,578	29	611		
16 Feb	3	804	0	14	978	56,556	37	648		
17 Feb	2	806	0	14	790	57,346	21	669		
18 Feb	2	808	0	14	768	58,114	17	688		
19 Feb	2	810	0	14	938	59,052	20	708		
20 Feb	2	812	0	14	1,020	60,072	7	715		
21 Feb	1	813	0	14	743	60,815	10	725		
22 Feb	4	817	0	14	601	61,416	14	739		
23 Feb	0	817	0	14	735	62,151	15	754		
24 Feb	1	818	0	14	907	63,058	13	767		
25 Feb	0	818	0	14	745	63,803	7	774		
26 Feb	1	819	0	14	784	64,587	9	783		
27 Feb	2	821	0	14	883	65,470	3	786		
28 Feb	0	821	0	14	870	66,340	3	789		
1 Mar	0	821	0	14	482	66,822	3	792		
2 Mar	0	821	0	14	865	67,687	1	793		
3 Mar	0	821	0	14	1,189	68,876	1	794		
4 Mar	0	821	0	14	1,095	69,971	2	796		
5 Mar	0	821	0	14	777	70,748	2	798		
6 Mar	0	821	0	14	1,069	71,817	3	801		

== See also ==
- COVID-19 pandemic in Europe
- COVID-19 pandemic by country and territory
- COVID-19 pandemic in Jersey
- COVID-19 pandemic in the Isle of Man
