= Telecommunications in the United Kingdom =

Telecommunications in the United Kingdom have evolved from the early days of the telegraph to modern fibre broadband and high-speed 5G networks.

== History ==
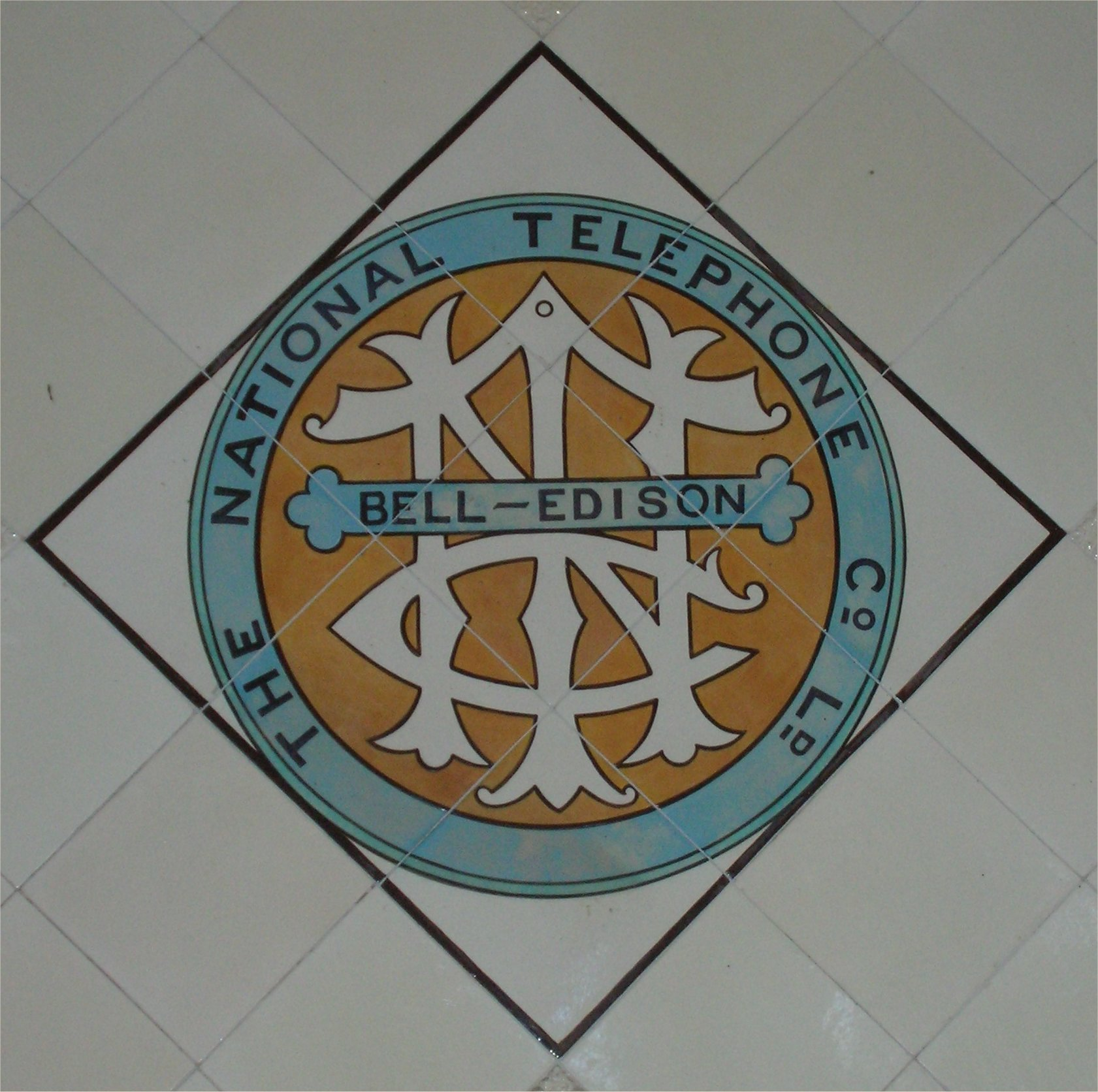
Company logo on porch of 17 & 19 Newhall Street, Birmingham (former Central exchange)

Telegraph engineer William Preece demonstrated Alexander Graham Bell's telephone in Britain in 1877. The General Post Office (GPO) had by then nationalised electrical telegraphy in the United Kingdom. After an 1880 court decision found that the GPO's telegraph monopoly extended to the telephone, the GPO awarded licences to private companies to build telephone networks around the country.

National Telephone Company (NTC) was a British telephone company from 1881 until 1911, which brought together smaller local companies. Under the Telephone Transfer Act 1911 it was taken over by the GPO in 1912.

The telephone service in the United Kingdom was originally provided by private companies and local city councils, but by 1912–13 all except the telephone service of Kingston upon Hull, Yorkshire and Guernsey had been bought out by the General Post Office. Post Office Telephones also operated telephone services in Jersey and the Isle of Man until 1969 when the islands took over responsibility for their own postal and telephone services. Post Office Telephones was reorganised in 1980–81 as British Telecommunications (British Telecom, or BT), and was the first nationalised industry to be privatised by the Conservative government. The civil telecoms monopoly ended when Mercury Communications arrived in 1983.

Broadcasting of radio and television was a duopoly of the BBC and Independent Broadcasting Authority (IBA): these two organisations controlled all broadcast services, and directly owned and operated the broadcast transmitter sites. Mobile phone and Internet services did not then exist. Broadcast transmitters, which belonged to the BBC and IBA, were privatised during the 1990s and now belong to Babcock International and Arqiva.

British Rail Telecommunications was created in 1992 by British Rail (BR). It was the largest private telecoms network in Britain, consisting of 17,000 route kilometres of fibre optic and copper cable which connected every major city and town in the country and provided links to continental Europe through the Channel Tunnel. BR also operated its own national trunked radio network providing dedicated train-to-shore mobile communications, and in the early 1980s BR helped establish Mercury Communications', now C&WC, core infrastructure by laying a resilient 'figure-of-eight' fibre optic network alongside Britain's railway lines, spanning London, Bristol, Birmingham, Leeds and Manchester.

Regulation of communications has changed many times during the same period, and most of the bodies have been merged into Ofcom, the independent regulator and competition authority for the UK communications industries.

== Infrastructure ==
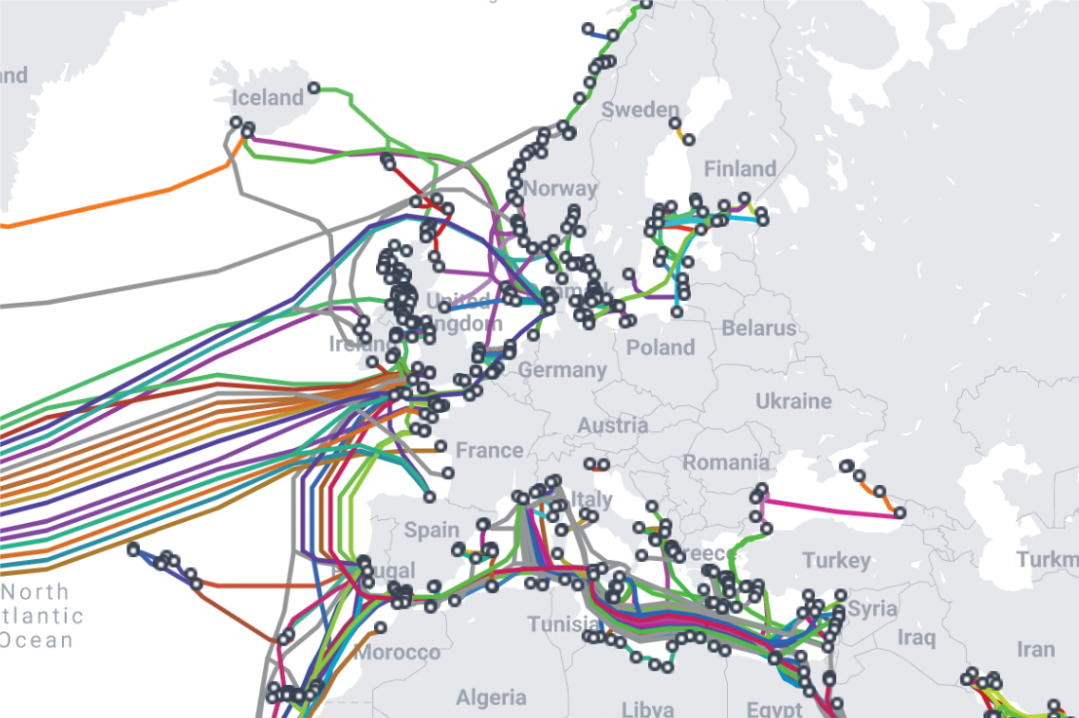
The different submarine internet cables are represented in colors over a map of Europe.

=== Domestic trunk infrastructure ===
All communications trunks are now digital. Most are carried via national optical fibre networks. There are several companies with national fibre networks, including BT, Level 3 Communications, Virgin Media, Cable & Wireless, Easynet and Thus. Microwave links are used up to the 155 Mbit/s level, but are seldom cost-effective at higher bit rates.

=== International trunks ===
The UK is a focal point for many of the world's submarine communications cables, which are now mostly digital optical fibre cables.

=== Broadcast transmission ===
Arqiva provide services for content contribution, coding and multiplexing, distribution to the transmitter sites as well as maintaining the national transmitter network itself for television.

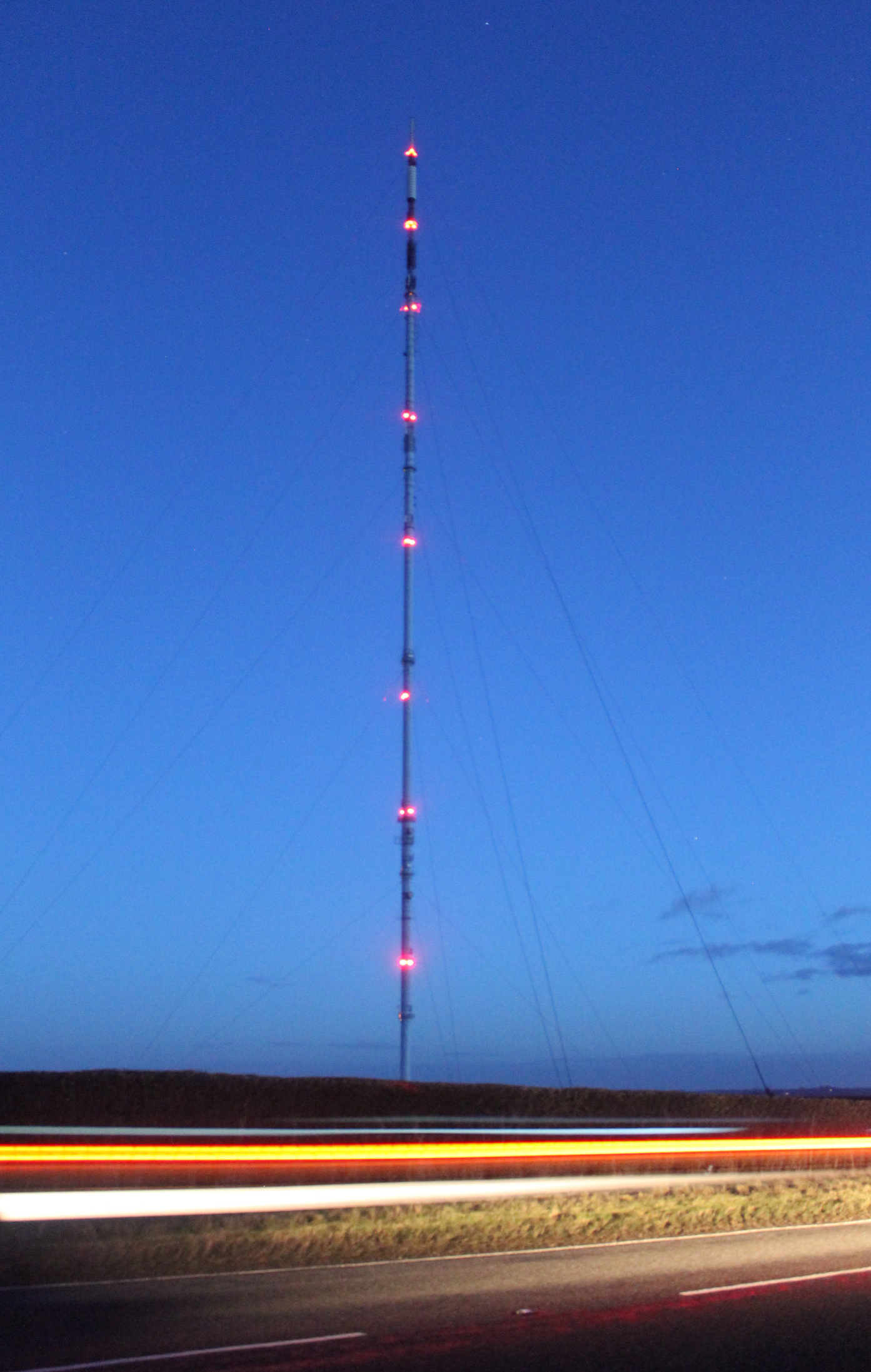
The Belmont Transmitter Mast seen at night

Arqiva's radio network transmits 380 analogue and 300 digital radio stations across the UK via 1,450 radio transmitter sites. They operate the two commercial national multiplexes – Digital One and Sound Digital – and provide transmission services to the BBC for their national DAB (Digital Audio Broadcasting) multiplex as well as spectrum planning expertise for small-scale DAB license applicants. They also provide managed transmission services (MTS) and network access (NA) services for both analogue and digital channels from over 1,450 sites across the UK and they also provide contribution, coding and multiplexing and distribution for national and local DAB multiplexes.

== Services ==
=== Television and radio broadcasting ===
==== Radio ====
In 1998, there were 663 radio broadcast stations: 219 on AM, 431 on FM and 3 on shortwave. There were 84.5 million radio receiver sets (1997). Today there are around 600 licensed radio stations in the UK.

==== Television ====
Currently, the United Kingdom has a collection of free-to-air, free-to-view and subscription services over a variety of distribution media, through which there are hundreds of channels for consumers as well as on-demand content.

Since 24 October 2012, all television broadcasts in the United Kingdom have been in a digital format, following the end of analogue transmissions in Northern Ireland. Digital content is delivered via terrestrial, satellite and cable, as well as over IP.

=== Internet ===
The country code top-level domain for United Kingdom web pages is .uk. Nominet UK is the .uk. Network Information Centre and second-level domains must be used.

At the end of 2004, 52% of households (12.6 million) were reported to have access to the internet (Source: Office for National Statistics Omnibus Survey). broadband connections accounted for 50.7% of all internet connections in July 2005, with one broadband connection being created every ten seconds. Broadband connections grew by nearly 80% in 2004. In 1999, there were 364 Internet service providers (ISPs). Public libraries also provide access to the internet, sometimes for a fee.

In 2017, 90% of households were reported to have access to an internet connection. This percentage shows an increase in internet access from 80% in 2012 and 61% in 2007.

== Mobile telephony ==
=== Mobile phone networks ===
Timeline

Vodafone
Cellnet
BT Cellnet
O2
Mercury One2One
One2One
T-Mobile
Orange
EE
Three
│
1985
│
1987
│
1989
│
1991
│
1993
│
1995
│
1997
│
1999
│
2001
│
2003
│
2005
│
2007
│
2009
│
2011
│
2013
│
2015
│
2017
│
2019
│
2021
│
2023
│
2025

Rank	Logo	Operator	Technology	Subscribers (in millions)	Ownership	MCC / MNC
1		Vodafone	900 MHz GSM (GPRS, EDGE) 800/900/1500/1800/2100/2600 MHz LTE, LTE-A 2600 MHz TD-LTE 900/2100/3500 MHz 5G NR VoLTE, VoWiFi, AML	27.9 (April–June 2026) (Includes VOXI, SMARTY & Talkmobile)	VodafoneThree (Vodafone Group plc)	23415
1		Three	700/800/1500/1800/2100 MHz LTE, LTE-A 700/2100/3500 MHz 5G NR VoLTE, VoWiFi, AML, RCS	27.9 (April–June 2026) (Includes VOXI, SMARTY & Talkmobile)	VodafoneThree (Vodafone Group plc)	23420
2		O2	900 MHz GSM (GPRS, EDGE) 900/2100 MHz UMTS, HSPA, HSPA+, DC-HSPA+ 700/800/900/1800/2100 MHz LTE, LTE-A 2300/2600 MHz TD-LTE 700/900/2100/2300/3500 MHz 5G NR VoLTE, VoWiFi, AML, RCS	22.0 (January–February 2026)(Includes Giffgaff)	Virgin Media O2 (50% Telefonica, 50% Liberty Global)	23410
3		EE	1800 MHz GSM (GPRS, EDGE) 700/800/1800/2100/2600 MHz LTE, LTE-A 700/1800/2100/2600/3500 MHz 5G NR VoLTE, VoWiFi, AML, RCS	21.2 (July–September 2025)(Includes BT Mobile)	BT Group	23430 and 23433

==== First generation networks ====
- Cellnet was originally jointly owned by British Telecom and Securicor. BT eventually bought out Securicor's stake. The network became BT Cellnet and was then demerged to become O2.
- Vodafone.

Both companies ran ETACS analogue mobile phone networks.

==== 2G ====
2G is being phased out and replaced with 4G and 5G. The four mobile network operators have agreed to switch off their 2G networks by 2033.

==== 3G ====
The four 2G companies all won 3G licences in a competitive auction, as did a new entrant known as Hutchison 3G, which branded its network as 3.

3G networks were rolled-out during the early 2000s. They made it possible to access the internet through a mobile phone for the first time.

Mobile network operators are in the process of switching off their 3G networks. EE, Vodafone and Three have completed their switch-offs, with O2 expected to follow in 2025, starting with the City of Durham in April.

==== 4G ====
4G/Long-term evolution (LTE) services are extensive. EE launched their 4G network in October 2012, using part of their existing 1800 MHz spectrum. O2 launched its 4G network on 29 August 2013, initially in London, Leeds and Bradford with a further 13 cities added by the end of 2013. Vodafone commenced its 4G services on 29 August 2013, initially in London with 12 more cities added by the end of 2013. Three commenced 4G services in London, Birmingham, Manchester, Reading, Wolverhampton and the Black country in December 2013 albeit with a limited number of subscribers to evaluate its implementation. Full rollout to remaining subscribers commenced on 5 February 2014 on a phased basis via a silent SIM update. As a condition of acquiring part of EE's 1800MHz spectrum for 4G use, Three were unable to use it until October 2013.

==== 5G ====
5G is currently being rolled-out by mobile network operators. The first commercial networks went live in major UK cities in 2019. However, as of 2025, nationwide coverage remains poor.

EE was the first to launch their 5G network, initially in London, Cardiff, Edinburgh, Belfast, Birmingham and Manchester on 30 May 2019, followed by Vodafone in Birmingham, Bristol, Cardiff, Glasgow, Manchester, Liverpool and London on 3 July 2019. Three launched their 5G service on 19 August 2019, initially for broadband customers in London. O2 was the last network to launch a 5G network; the rollout of which began in October 2019, starting with Belfast, Cardiff, Edinburgh, London, Slough and Leeds.

==== Numbers ====
When mobile cellular networks were first rolled out, there were various numbers beginning 03 through 09 in use, these being interspersed between the various existing geographic area codes. As part of the Big Number Change, all mobile (as well as pager and personal) numbers were brought together under the 07 range.

=== Mobile phone services ===
There are four mobile network operators in the United Kingdom - O2, EE, Vodafone, and Three.

The number of active mobile subscriptions (excluding M2M) was 89.6 million at the end of Q2 2024, up 2.1 million (2.4%) from the year before.

In 2011 there were 82 million subscriptions in the UK. There were 76 million in 2008 and 55 million in January 2005.

All of the mobile network operators sell mobile phone services directly. In addition, there are a large number of mobile virtual network operators (MVNOs). Examples include Tesco Mobile, spusu, Lebara, and SMARTY.

== Fixed telephony ==
=== Landlines ===
BT is still the main provider of fixed telephone lines and it has a universal service obligation, although companies can contract Openreach to install a phone line on their behalf, rather than telling the customer to get BT to install it, then transfer over.

Sky is the second biggest player in the residential telephone line market. Other companies provide fixed telephone services such as Virgin Media, Vodafone and EE.

In Q2 2024, the total number of fixed voice lines (including PSTN, ISDN and VoIP) was 25.4 million, a fall of 2.6% compared to the previous year. Total fixed-originated call volumes decreased by 1.22 billion minutes (21.5%) to 4.46 billion minutes.

The switched telephone network (both PSTN and ISDN) is due to be turned off on 31 January 2027, after customers are moved to voice over IP services.

==== Numbering ====
There is a set numbering plan for phone numbers within the United Kingdom, which is regulated by the Office of Communications (Ofcom), which replaced the Office of Telecommunications (Oftel) in 2003. Each number consists of an area code – one for each of the large towns and cities and their surroundings – and a subscriber number – the individual number.

== Overseas Territories and Crown Dependencies ==
- Telecommunications in Antarctica (including the British Antarctic Territory)
- Telecommunications in Bermuda
- Telecommunications in the British Indian Ocean Territory
- Telecommunications in the British Virgin Islands
- Telecommunications in the Cayman Islands
- Telecommunications in the Falkland Islands
- Telecommunications in Gibraltar
- Telecommunications in Guernsey
- Telecommunications in the Isle of Man
- Telecommunications in Jersey
- Telecommunications in Montserrat
- Telecommunications in the Pitcairn Islands
- Telecommunications in Saint Helena, Ascension Island and Tristan da Cunha
- Telecommunications in South Georgia and the South Sandwich Islands
- Telecommunications in the Turks and Caicos Islands

== See also ==
- BBC
- British and Irish Magnetic Telegraph Company
- British Telegraph Company
- BT Group, formerly British Telecom
- Electric Telegraph Company
- Electrical telegraphy in the United Kingdom
- Global Coalition on Telecommunications
- History of telephone numbers in the United Kingdom
- Independent Broadcasting Authority (IBA)
- Institute of Telecommunications Professionals
- List of dialling codes in the United Kingdom
- List of postcode areas in the United Kingdom (about 120)
- List of postcode districts in the United Kingdom (about 2900)
- List of telephone operating companies
- London District Telegraph Company
- National Telephone Company (NTC), 1881 to 1911
- Telegraph Act 1868
- Telephone Transfer Act 1911
  - General Post Office (GPO)
  - Post Office Telecommunications
- United Kingdom Telegraph Company

== Bibliography ==
- CIA World Factbook
