= Telecommunications in Jersey =

Telecommunication services in Jersey comprise Internet, telephone, broadcasting and postal services, which allow islanders to contact people and receive information.

== Internet ==
As of 2018, three companies provide fixed-line services to the island -

- Jersey Telecom (JT), who operate island's fixed-line network;
- Sure, whose services are based on wholesale access to JT's infrastructure; and
- Newtel, who focus on business customers and also use JT's infrastructure.

As all services are based on JT's infrastructure, there is limited competition. Nevertheless, islanders enjoy average fixed broadband download speeds which outstrip the UK and other small countries. As of 2021, Jersey has the highest broadband speeds of any country in the world, with an average rate of 274.27 Mbit/s, compared with Liechtenstein, which only had speeds of 211.26 Mbit/s, and the global average of just 9.10 Mbit/s.

JT has dominance over the broadband sector, with 68% broadband market share in 2015, however this is declining relative to the competition. In terms of value for money on high-speed internet services, Jersey broadband consumers pay lower prices than nations like Bermuda, but higher prices than in the UK or the Isle of Man, but for lower-speed services islanders pay far lower prices than other small islands (and less than UK consumers).

Jersey broadband services market share
	2012	2016
JT	78%	68%
Sure	13%	27%
Newtel	9%	5%

Internet connectivity to the rest of the world is provided by undersea cables linked to Guernsey, the UK and France. In 2016, a ship – believed to be the King Arthur owned by Mediterranea di Navigazione – dragging its anchor on the seabed in the English Channel cut the three main internet cables to Jersey and Guersey. As a result, all communications traffic had to travel via cables to France.

== Mobile telephones ==
Jersey is part of the UK's National Telephone Numbering Plan, which means the island shares the UK's international dialling code +44.

4G license operators in the island are obligated to provide a 2 Mbit/s download speed to 95% of the island population 90% of the time. In 2016, the island had 95% 4G coverage and higher average mobile data speeds than (7 major cities in) the UK.

In 2020, JT retains the majority mobile market share of 52%, compared with 24% for Airtel-Vodafone and 23% for Sure, the island's other mobile operators. In 2020, there were 124,262 mobile subscriptions, of which 2,845 were mobile only.

Mobile data prices are lower in Jersey than other similarly sized countries, such as Bermuda and Malta, but slightly higher than the major operators in the UK. In 2020, the following mobile usage statistics were recorded: 202.0 million mobile minutes, 48.3 million SMS messages and 9.56 million GB of data used.

== Landline telephones ==
Jersey is part of the UK's National Telephone Numbering Plan, which means the island shares the UK's international dialling code +44. Landline telephone numbers have the area code 01534.

== Future ==
The Government of Jersey has a telecommunications development strategy called A telecoms strategy for Jersey.

== Telephony ==
=== Addressing ===
Jersey is incorporated into the UK National Telephone Numbering Plan, using the following area codes:

- JT Global (formerly Jersey Telecom):
  - +44 1534 for land-lines
  - +44 7797 for mobiles
- Sure (Batelco):
  - +44 7700 for mobiles
- Airtel-Vodafone:
  - +44 7829 for mobiles

==== Fixed line ====
Fixed PSTN lines in use; approx 57,700 (2009).

==== Mobile cellular ====
- JT Group Limited
- Sure
- Airtel-Vodafone

With over 120 mobile phone masts, in 2012, spread across its 119 km^{2} (46 sq mi) area, the island has a phone mast density almost five times that of the United Kingdom as a whole but similar to any urban area.

=== Telephony system and infrastructure ===
==== Domestic ====
Jersey Telecom:

- System X supplied by Marconi Communications.
- Marconi Softswitch and UTStarcom SoftSwitch.

==== Connectivity ====
- 4 submarine communication cables.
- 2 microwave links.

== Mass media ==
=== Radio ===
Digital DAB+ broadcasts started in Jersey on 1 August 2021.

==== Radio broadcast stations ====
- BBC Radio Jersey 88·8MHz FM, 1026kHz MW AM, DAB+ and bbc.co.uk/jersey.
- Channel 103 103·7 MHz FM, DAB+ and channel103.com.
- Radio Lions, a closed-circuit hospital radio station launched by the Jersey Lions Club in 1975.
- Radio Force 7, a former Saint-Malo radio station, pioneered bilingual broadcasting aimed at the Channel Islands from January 1988 to the early 1990s.
- Contact 94. Former radio station (5 September 1988 to 29 November 1991) broadcasting to the island from Normandy.

==== Radio receiver adoption and usage ====
Not available

=== Television ===
==== Television broadcast stations ====
- ITV Channel Television.
- Sub Opt from BBC One of Spotlight Channel Islands.

==== Cable television ====
- Newtel Solutions

==== Satellite television ====
- BSkyB

==== Television set adoption and usage ====
Not available

=== Internet service providers (ISPs) ===
- JT Group Limited which owns most of the telecommunications infrastructure in Jersey
- Newtel Solutions
- Sure
- Airtel-Vodafone (3G data only)

== See also ==
- Frémont Point Transmitter
