= Telestial =

- Industry: Wireless Services
- Founded: 1999
- Headquarters: Boston, Massachusetts, U.S.
- Area served: United States and over 210 countries worldwide
- Key people: Ken Grunski, Founder
- Parent: JT Group Limited
- Website: www.telestial.com

Telestial is a mobile virtual network operator headquartered in Boston with a large share of North America’s international cell phone market. Telestial offers travelers a local cell phone service at local rates with a local cell phone number as an alternative to an expensive phone rental and convenient but expensive international roaming. Telestial is a provider of international cell phones and SIM cards.

== History ==
Telestial began operations in September 1999 and was founded by former telecommunications consultant Ken Grunski, after frustrations with calling during travels in Southeast Asia and the Indian subcontinent. By establishing dealerships with wireless carriers overseas, Telestial was able to offer travelers a local cell phone service at local rates. Telestial became incorporated in February 2000 and launched telestial.com in June 2000, offering two dual-band GSM 900/1800 handset and local prepaid sim cards from seven countries including Germany, France, UK, and South Africa. This is the first time that local SIM cards were available to consumers in the US and around the world, for purchase outside their respective host countries. Telestial is an alternative to an expensive phone rental and convenient but expensive international roaming.

In 2003, Telestial introduced the HopAbroad service for North American travelers. This was the first international prepaid roaming SIM that offered a single flat rate for coverage in 70 countries.

In March 2007, with local prepaid SIM cards and dealerships covering over 70 countries from New Zealand and Fiji to Tanzania, Sweden and Brazil, as well as the Explorer and Passport international roaming SIM cards, Telestial agreed to merge operations with ekit, retaining all brands and services. In 2010, JT Global, of the Channel Islands, acquired ekit becoming the new parent company of Telestial.

== Services and products ==
Telestial sells GSM cell phones that work in countries in Europe and Asia, as well as phones that will work both in these countries and in the United States and Canada. Telestial also has operations in Australia, the UK and Europe. Telestial works with over 300 companies in the travel industry.

In May 2009, Telestial became the first company to offer a dual-number SIM, the Passport SIM, with U.S. and U.K. global cell phone service all in one.
