= Competition (Jersey) Law 2005 =

States Assembly
- Territorial extent: Jersey
- Passed by: States Assembly
- Passed: L.6/2005
- Royal assent: Registered in the Royal Court
- Signed: 18 February 2005
- Effective: 1 May 2005 (except Parts 2 and 3). 1 November 2005 (Parts 2 and 3)
- Committee report: Draft Competition (Jersey) Law

Related legislation
- Royal Court (Competition) Rules 2005
- Status: In force

The Competition (Jersey) Law 2005 is Jersey's statutory law governing competition in the markets. On 23 June 2005, the States Assembly approved the Act.

On 1 May 2005, the Act came into force, excluding Parts 2 and 3 of the Act, which came into effect on 1 November 2005.

Part 2 deals with prohibiting anti-competitive agreements Part 3 deals with the Abuse of dominance.

== Legal History ==
The two jurisdictions in the Channel Islands:

- Bailiwick of Jersey
- Bailiwick of Guernsey

Like Guernsey, Jersey is not for domestic purposes part of the United Kingdom; rather, it is a dependency of the British Crown in the King's capacity as Duke of Normandy. This is because Channel Islands were the only part of the Duchy of Normandy not to be conquered by France in the reign of King John. The Channel Islands have been therefore never conquered by England (rather, the reverse); and have never formed part of England.

However, the United Kingdom is responsible for Jersey at International level, and the United Kingdom parliament (in which the Channel Islands are not represented) has the power to legislate for Jersey - although by convention this power is not exercised save with the consent of the Island, and in most matters legislation in Jersey is left to the States of Jersey (the Island's parliament), subject to Court being approved by Her Majesty in Council. Jersey's common law is based on Norman customary law rather than on English law, it has its own system of courts (the Royal Court and a Court of Appeal, with a final appeal to the Privy Council), and in many significant ways Jersey law differs from the law in the various parts of the UK.

== Legal framework ==
=== Anticompetitive arrangements ===
Article 8.(1) Prohibits anticompetitive arrangements with one or more other. Anticompetitive arrangements are those arrangements that has the object or effect of hindering to an appreciable extent Competition in the supply of goods or services within Jersey or any part of Jersey.

=== Dominant position ===
Article 16 prohibits abuse of dominance by one or more undertakings of a dominant position in trade of any goods or services in Jersey or in any part of Jersey is prohibited.

=== Merger control ===
Competition Law (Jersey) 2005 prohibits certain mergers and acquisitions of companies and businesses taking place without the approval of the JCRA. According to The Competition (Mergers and Acquisitions) (Jersey) Order 2010 prior approval from the Jersey Competition Regulatory Authority (JCRA) is necessary to acquire in cases were such merger or acquisition would result into a new undertaking with a share of 25% or more of the supply or purchase of goods or services in Jersey, or enhance such a share held by an undertaking

== See also ==
- Jersey Competition Regulatory Authority
