= Newtel Solutions =

Telecommunications company in the Channel Islands

Newtel Ltd
- Industry: Telecommunications
- Founded: 1988
- Headquarters: St. Helier, Jersey, Channel Islands, UK,
- Products: Leased line, [Internet access], VOIP
- Parent: Newtel Limited
- Website: newtel.je

Newtel Limited (formerly known as Jersey Cable) is the operator of a cable television network in Jersey, Channel Islands. Newtel Solutions also provides telecommunications services including telephony and broadband, using retail brands Homenet and Ytel.

Newtel was, prior to 1998, known as Jersey Cable Limited, a company founded by Peter Funk in 1988.

It acquired the former Rediffusion (Channel Islands) Limited cable network from British Electric Traction Limited in 1988. Jersey Cable had invested heavily in a new TV cable network, replacing the Rediffusion overhead cable system with an underground distribution network. Newtel first offered voice telephony using a Class Licence provided by the States of Jersey Telecommunications Board (now JT Group Limited), then later when the market was liberalised under a Class II licence issued by the Jersey Competition Regulatory Authority in 2003.

Newtel entered the Guernsey telecommunications market in 2002 when licensed by the Office of Utility Regulation as a communications provider (which has recently been sold to Wave Telecom). Newtel Solutions holds an Irrefutable Right of Use (IRU) on the Channel Islands Electric Grid telecommunications cable to France, over which it connects its communications internationally.
