= Nursing agency =

Business that provides nurses or health care assistants for employment

A Nursing Agency (also known as Home Health Agency or Home Care Agency) is a service provider agency which provides nurses and usually health care assistants (such as Certified Nursing Assistants) to people who need the services of home healthcare professionals. Nurses are normally engaged by the agency on temporary contracts and make themselves available for hire by hospitals, nursing homes, eldercare centers, and other providers of care for help during busy periods or to cover for staff absences. Some nurses may be seconded to private clients who choose to receive their nursing care within their own homes.

== Nature of work ==
As with other staffing agencies, a large amount of capital is necessary to operate, since nurses must be paid by the registry as often as they work, but the hospital or other institution utilizing the services of the registry might not pay the registry until several months after the work has been done. Profit margins for this type of business go between 4% and 70%.

Nurse staffing is an on-demand business. During holidays, hospitals often pay their staff overtime pay, and thus the need for external staffing services is diminished. An opposite effect is felt during summertime vacations when staff employees at hospitals take time off and the services of the home nursing agency are in greater need.

Nurse staffing is very demanding and requires a high degree of care and responsibility. There are many liability issues that must be kept in mind. Claims of negligence and inappropriate actions by the registry's nurses may result in lawsuits over the bodily injury. Malpractice insurance must be carried by the registry.

As a result of these inherent pitfalls and the progress of web technologies, many nurse staffing agencies evolved to online job boards, which would allow them to match registered nurse candidates with employers' nursing jobs. The web has transformed the nurse staffing industry, making it a more real-time process. Also, by offering direct contact between the candidates and employers, online staffing sites eliminate much of the liability involved in traditional nurse staffing.

== By country ==
=== United Kingdom ===
In the United Kingdom, there are two sources of supplementary nurses - nurse banks and nursing agencies. The former provides nurses paid on as "hours as required" basis and is often contracted to fill planned or unplanned shortfalls in staffing. Agency nurses, on the other hand, are employed through third-party agencies. Recent studies show that it has become common practice in the United Kingdom to use bank and agency nurses to fill vacant shifts in hospitals that cannot be filled by permanent staff. From 2002 to 2003, it was already reported that the National Health Service has spent £628 million on agency nursing. There are sources that cite how nurses employed through agencies tend to enjoy greater rewards and higher pay than those with institutional contracts.

English nursing agencies are regulated by the Commission for Social Care Inspection.

=== United States ===
In the United States, they are also called nurse registries. It is a staffing agency which may provide per diem or locum tenens nursing personnel to hospitals, medical offices, and individuals. They are generally small, privately owned businesses. They are also known as "nursing pools" and "nursing staffing agencies". A Nursing Registry as defined (for example) in Florida Statutes 400.462: "Nurse registry" means any person that procures, offers, promises, or attempts to secure health-care-related contracts for registered nurses, licensed practical nurses, certified nursing assistants, home health aides, companions, or homemakers, who are compensated by fees as independent contractors, including, but not limited to, contracts for the provision of services to patients and contracts to provide private duty or staffing services to health care facilities licensed under chapter 395, this chapter, or chapter 429 or other business entities.

The recent expansion of nursing work in America has led to the increased employment of foreign-born nurses, which account for one-third of the growth of the nursing labor market from 2001 to 2008 and 16 percent of the total U.S. nursing workforce by 2008. International recruiting can be costly for hospitals and, to save money, agencies are contracted and paid flat fee for each nurse employed. The bulk of recruited nurses come from the Philippines and Canada.

=== Singapore ===
In Singapore, the nursing registry is controlled by Singapore Nursing Board who categorized the nurses into Registered Nurse and Enrolled Nurse.

== See also ==
- NHS Professionals
