= Jersey Competition Regulatory Authority =

Competition regulator

Jersey Competition Regulatory Authority (JCRA)
- Type: Regulatory Authority
- Founded: 2001
- Headquarters: St. Helier, Jersey, Channel Islands, UK
- Key people: Tim Ringsdore, Chief Executive; Martin Coleman, Chairman
- Services: Competition, Postal and Telecommunications Regulation and Enforcement
- Website: Jersey Competition Regulatory Authority (JCRA)

The Jersey Competition Regulatory Authority (JCRA) is the competition, postal, and telecommunications regulatory authority for Jersey, a British Crown Dependency located in the English Channel.

== Jersey's Competition Laws ==
The Jersey Competition Regulatory Authority (JCRA) was established in 2001 as an independent statutory body with a broad jurisdiction under the Competition Regulatory Authority (Jersey) Law 2001. At the time that the legislation was considered by the states, the explanatory note mentioned:

""...it is deliberately intended that the JCRA is, and is seen to be, independent from the States in its licensing and regulatory roles. It is intrinsically important that these functions are undertaken independently but subject to clear statutory duties relating to securing service provision and protecting and promoting customers' interests in the face of monopoly or dominant providers of essential services."

In 2001, the States of Jersey passed the Competition Regulatory Authority (Jersey) Law 2001, which established the Jersey Competition Regulatory Authority (JCRA). It is an independent authority with duty for promoting competition and consumer interests through economic regulation and competition law, accountable to the Minister for Sustainable Economic Development. It is responsible for regulating and enforcing the Competition (Jersey) Law 2005. The JCRA provides periodic advice to the Minister and other State Departments on matters of competition and economic regulation. It is also regulates Telecommunication sector under the sector-specific Telecommunications (Jersey) Law 2002 and postal operators are regulated by the JCRA under the Postal Services (Jersey) Law 2004. The JCRA Board consists of a Chairman, three non-executive directors, and the Executive Director. Since September 2010 the JCRA shares its Executive Director with the Guernsey Office of Utility Regulation.

== CICRA ==
In December 2010, the JCRA in conjunction with the Guernsey Competition and Regulatory Authority created CICRA, the Channel Islands Competition and Regulatory Authorities. Accordingly, CICRA took over the majority of work previously undertaken by JCRA. In 2020 CICRA was disbanded at the request of Jersey, with the JCRA again picking up responsibility for competition regulation.

== Legal framework ==
In 2005, the Competition (Jersey) Law 2005 was enacted. It came in to force on 1 May 2005 (except parts 2 and 3). The remaining parts 2 & 3 took effect from 1 November 2005. The Competition (Jersey Law) 2005 prohibits entering into anti-competitive conduct, form anti-competitive agreements, and abuse dominant position by an entity in the market. Anti-Competitive agreements are agreements to fix the prices to be charged for goods or services, limit supply and/or production of goods or services, and share markets out between competitors. In contravention to it, the financial Penalties will apply, "Fine up to ten percent of their annual turnover during the period of the breach, up to a maximum of three years.

== Leadership ==
Martin Coleman was appointed Chair of the JCRA from 1 July 2026, succeeding Stephanie Liston who had served 6 years as Chair, appointed 1 July 2020 succeeding Sir Mark Boleat.

Tim Ringsdore was appointed Chief Executive of the JCRA on 1 January 2021.

== TimeLine ==
The JCRA issued a verdict on May 20, 2009, ruling for the first time that a public entity involved in the sewage services business had abused its dominant position and imposed fines to penalize its anti-competitive conduct.
