= Opinions (Omnibus) Survey =

The Omnibus Survey, now called the Opinions Survey, is a survey conducted monthly by the Office for National Statistics (ONS) in Great Britain in order to collect information for different governmental departments as well as non-profit organisations in the academic and voluntary sector.

== History ==
The Opinions (Omnibus) Survey was first set up in 1990 by the Office for National Statistics as a source of reliable, quick and cost-effective information on topics which are generally too brief to be addressed in a separate survey.

Since 2004, the survey consists of two different parts: the core questions concerning demographic information which are the same every month and non-core questions which cover different topics. Particular topics can be added for one month or longer and there are now over 300 questions modules. These modules cover issues such as contraception, tobacco consumption, changes to family income, unused medicines, internet access, etc.

Due to increased demand for the data collected, priority has been given to government departments and agencies relevant for policy-making purposes, though the data is also still available to non-profit organisations. In January 2008, the Opinions (Omnibus) Survey became part of the Integrated Household Survey (IHS) and also changed its name to the Opinions Survey.

== Methodology and scope ==
The survey is a repeated, cross-sectional study which is conducted 12 times a year by face-to-face interviews, using a sample of about 1,800 adults per survey. Each survey period lasts 14 weeks overall, including a four-week-long testing period and five weeks of evaluation at the end. The core questions are to be answered by all household member aged 15 and older whereas the varying module questions are only answered by one selected person.

== Survey results ==
The Opinions (Omnibus) survey allows the user to obtain results quickly and it can measure the efficacy of publicity campaigns. It can also give an indicator for public awareness of new policies and the survey is useful for question testing and piloting.

== Re-using the data ==
Registered users can obtain Omnibus data from the Economic and Social Data Service (ESDS) website.
