= Sure (company) =

Telecommunications company

Sure by Beyon
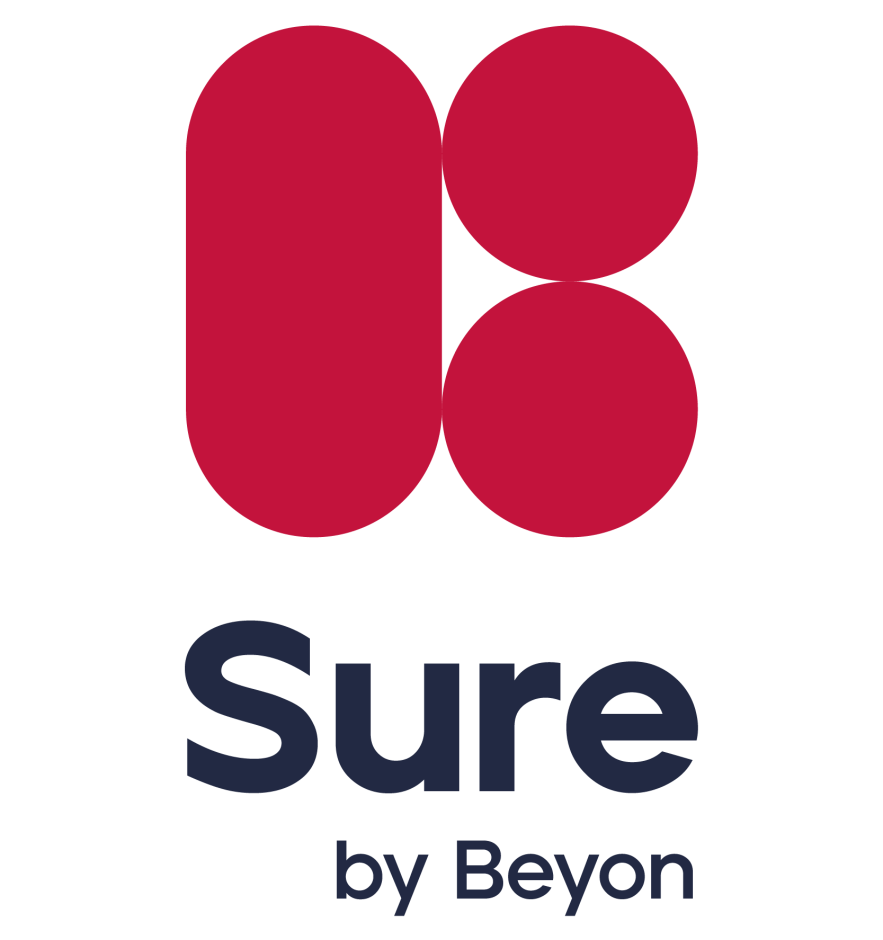
- Type: Subsidiary
- Industry: Telecommunications
- Founded: 17 June 1896; 130 years ago
- Headquarters: Guernsey, Jersey, Isle of Man, Falkland Islands, St Helena, Diego Garcia, Ascension Island
- Products: Mobile; landline; broadband
- Parent: Batelco
- Website: sure.com; sure.io; sure.co.sh; sure.co.ac; sure.co.fk

Sure, a trading brand of Batelco, is a telecommunications company in the Isle of Man, Jersey, Guernsey, the Falkland Islands, St. Helena, Ascension Island, and the British Indian Ocean Territory. Sure is the largest tri-island mobile operator across the Channel Islands and Isle of Man.

The international division of Cable & Wireless plc bought Guernsey Telecoms from the States of Guernsey in 2002, rebranding as Sure in July 2007. Cable & Wireless opened an office in Jersey in 2004, offering corporate telecoms products. It launched the Sure brand along with mobile services in September 2006. In the same year the company launched fixed line products (FirstDial Home and Business, later re-branded as SureDial Home & Business). In July 2007 Sure launched mobile services in the Isle of Man. In 2008 the company secured a fixed licence and introduced fixed line products (SureDial Home & Business), as well as high speed mobile broadband utilising HSDPA. It launched fixed broadband services in the third quarter of 2009.

Sure became part of Cable & Wireless Communications in 2010 following a corporate split of Cable & Wireless plc, and was purchased by Batelco Islands Limited in 2013. The company has the largest market share of mobile, landline and broadband customers in the Bailiwick of Guernsey, which incorporates the islands of Guernsey, Herm, Alderney and Sark.

Sure is regulated in the jurisdictions in which it operates.

== History ==
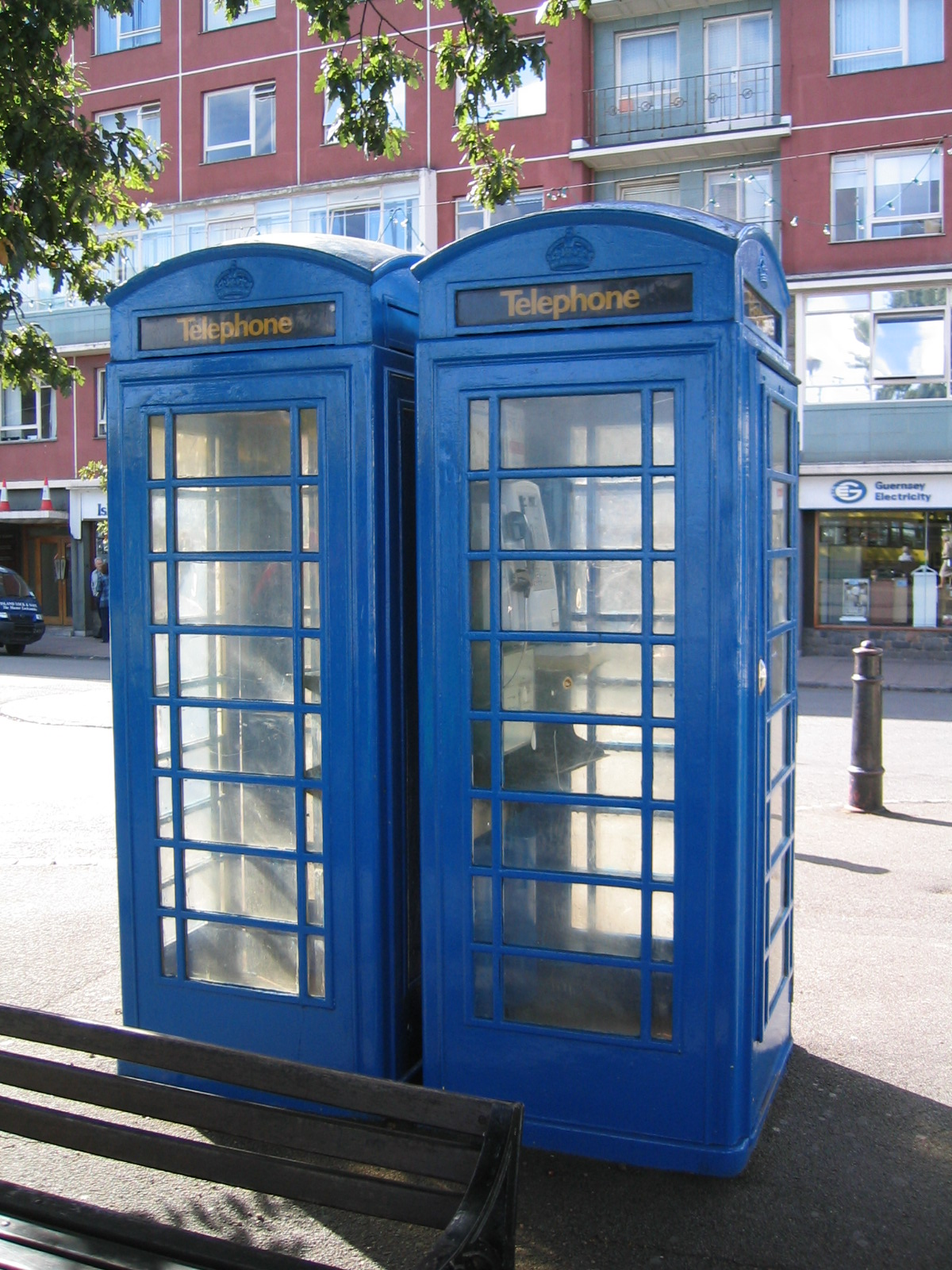
Phone boxes in St Peter Port, Guernsey, two of the four traditional K6 kiosks on the island

Cable & Wireless first entered the Channel Islands market when it purchased Guernsey Telecoms (formerly the States Telecommunications Board) from the States of Guernsey.

The service was founded on 17 June 1896 as the States Telephone Department to "establish, maintain and operate" an independent telephone system for the island which would have a maximum of 400 subscribers. Guernsey, together with Kingston-upon-Hull (see KCOM Group), was outside of the telecommunications monopoly which was created in the British Islands in 1912 by the General Post Office following its purchase of the National Telephone Company Limited.

On 1 October 2001, following a decision by the States of Guernsey to privatise the telecoms industry, operations were transferred from the States of Guernsey Telecommunications Board to a new corporate structure called Guernsey Telecoms Ltd in preparation for privatisation.

On 30 May 2002, the company was sold to Cable & Wireless. One of the first changes that islanders noticed was that the telephone kiosks, which were previously yellow, were repainted blue.

Four months later on 30 September 2002, the company was rebranded as Cable and Wireless Guernsey, and following the expansion into Jersey and the Isle of Man, it was re-branded as Sure.

On 3 June 2007, Sure launched in the Isle of Man where they offer business and residential mobile and broadband services using a mobile network that they wholly own and operate. Broadband is wholesale purchased from the Island's principal communications company, Manx Telecom. Sure has permission to offer fixed-line telephone services across Manx Telecom's lines.

In March 2010, Cable & Wireless split, and Sure became part of Cable & Wireless Communications which demerged from the business.

Sure launched their own 16Mb broadband service in the Isle of Man on 1 November 2010 and on 1 September 2011 were the first telecoms company to take pre-orders for VDSL2 broadband (supplied wholesale from Manx Telecom) capable of up to 40 Mbps downstream and 2 Mbps upstream. The service launched on 1 October 2011.

In April 2013, Sure was sold to the Bahrain telecommunications company, Batelco which then adopted the new Sure International brand for its business services.

In 2017, an independent review carried out by the Channel Islands Competition and Regulatory Authorities found that Sure had the fastest mobile network in the Channel Islands, with average downloads speeds being twice as fast as their nearest competitor.

In December 2020, it emerged that Sure Guernsey had, in 2018, provided the Israeli surveillance company Rayzone Group with access to the SS7 signaling system, thereby enabling it to track the location of any cellphone globally.

In November 2024 Sure completed the Acquisition of Airtel-Vodafone

In October 2025, The company Sure rebranded to Sure by Beyon to align with the high-standards and global reach of the Beyon Group, which they have been a part of since 2013.

== Investment ==
Since 2002, Cable & Wireless has invested over £40 million in infrastructure, services and products in the Channel Islands and the Isle of Man. The introduction of mobile number portability in the Channel Islands in December 2008 and in the Isle of Man in 2009 led to Sure re-launching all of its price plans to compete with the other operators serving the individual islands.

Sure has international roaming agreements with 200 countries across the world. It allows customers to roam across the Channel Islands and Isle of Man without incurring roaming charges.

In 2006 Sure completed the £6.5 million Project HUGO which saw two new fibre optic cables being brought ashore in Guernsey, directly connecting to the Cable & Wireless global infrastructure.

== See also ==
- List of mobile network operators in Europe
