= JT Group Limited =

Bailiwick of Jersey telecommunications company

Jersey Telecom Group Limited
- Trade name: JT
- Industry: Telecommunications
- Founded: 1888
- Headquarters: Saint Helier, Jersey and St Peter Port, Guernsey
- Key people: Daragh McDermott (CEO); Meriel Lenfestey (Non-Executive Chairman)
- Services: Managed Services Voice Mobile Cloud Data Centre Cybersecurity SIM swap prevention Sponsored Roaming mobile number portability EGaming
- Owner: Government of Jersey
- Subsidiaries: Jersey Telecom Limited; Jersey Telecom (UK) Limited
- Website: www.jtglobal.com

JT Group Limited (doing business as JT) is the parent company of several subsidiaries including Jersey Telecom Limited and Wave Telecom Limited. Jersey Telecom is the former monopoly operator in the Bailiwick of Jersey. JT provides telecommunications, Internet access and other services, mostly within the Channel Islands.

== History ==
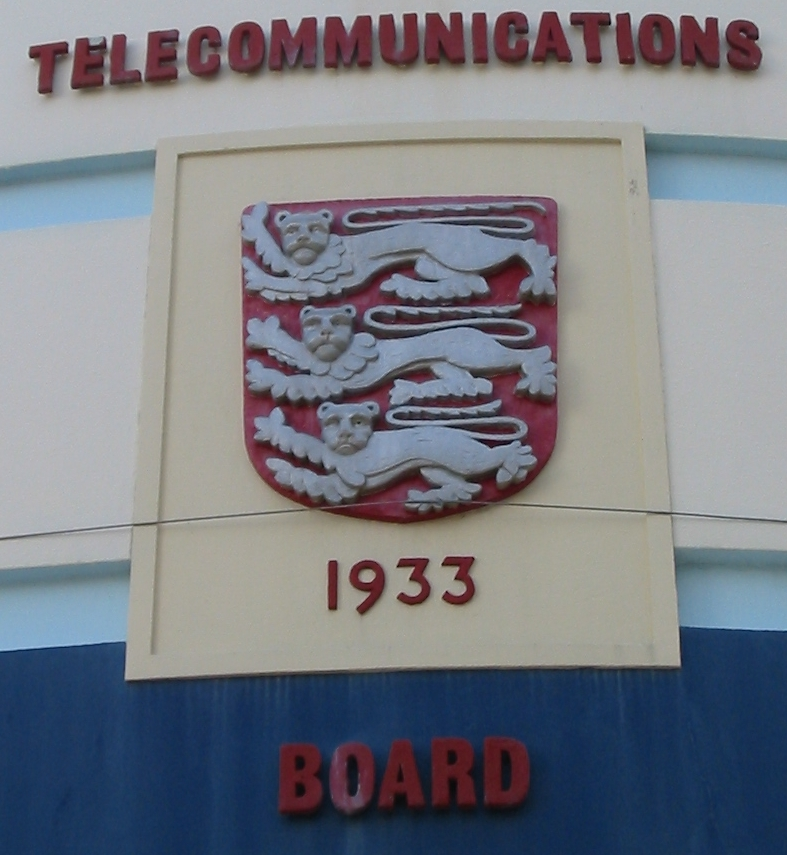
The arms on the Minden Place exchange, dated 1933

In 1972 legislation was passed in Jersey, which led the States of Jersey to take over the country's telephone exchanges from the British Post Office. A state monopoly was formed through the Telecommunications Board in 1973, and remained under state control until 2003, when the market was opened to competition. In 2002 JT was granted licences by the Office of Utility Regulation to operate fixed and mobile telecommunications services to, from and within the Bailiwick of Guernsey and was known as Wave Telecom. The following year in 2003, Jersey Telecom became a private company, though it remained under 100% ownership by the States.

In 2006 the States of Jersey Council of Ministers proposed the sale of JT Limited. In 2008, following comments in the Scrutiny report and market uncertainty, the Minister for Treasury and Resources decided to withdraw the proposition. In November 2006 JT then announced that it was to install a new high capacity optical submarine cable from Dartmouth to L'Ancresse Bay on the north west tip of Guernsey. In 2009 Graeme Millar, formerly Chief Commercial Officer of Mobile TeleSystems, the Russian mobile operator, became the CEO of JT.

In April 2010 JT relaunched its Next Generation Networking (NGN) programme which had run into technical difficulties the previous autumn. In September 2011, Jersey Telecom changed its name to JT. The following year, in 2012, JT acquired Worldstone. In September 2014, JT began work on a £12m 4G network in Jersey. The first masts went live in February 2015 and full Island coverage was reached three months later. On 28 March 2014 JT partnered with Fon and the service became available to JT broadband subscribers connected to fibre in 2016.

=== Digital sandbox ===
In 2018 JT began partnering with Sony in order to test its newly developed Low-Power, Wide-Area Wireless Network (LPWAN) technology, for use in the Internet of Things where low speed data links are utilized. That year JT also partnered with ZTE to bring a 5G network to the Channel islands. Both deals are a part of JT's and Jersey's role as a "digital sandbox", for testing new telecommunications technologies. That year JT was named Digital Company of the Year award at the Jersey TechAwards.

== Operations ==
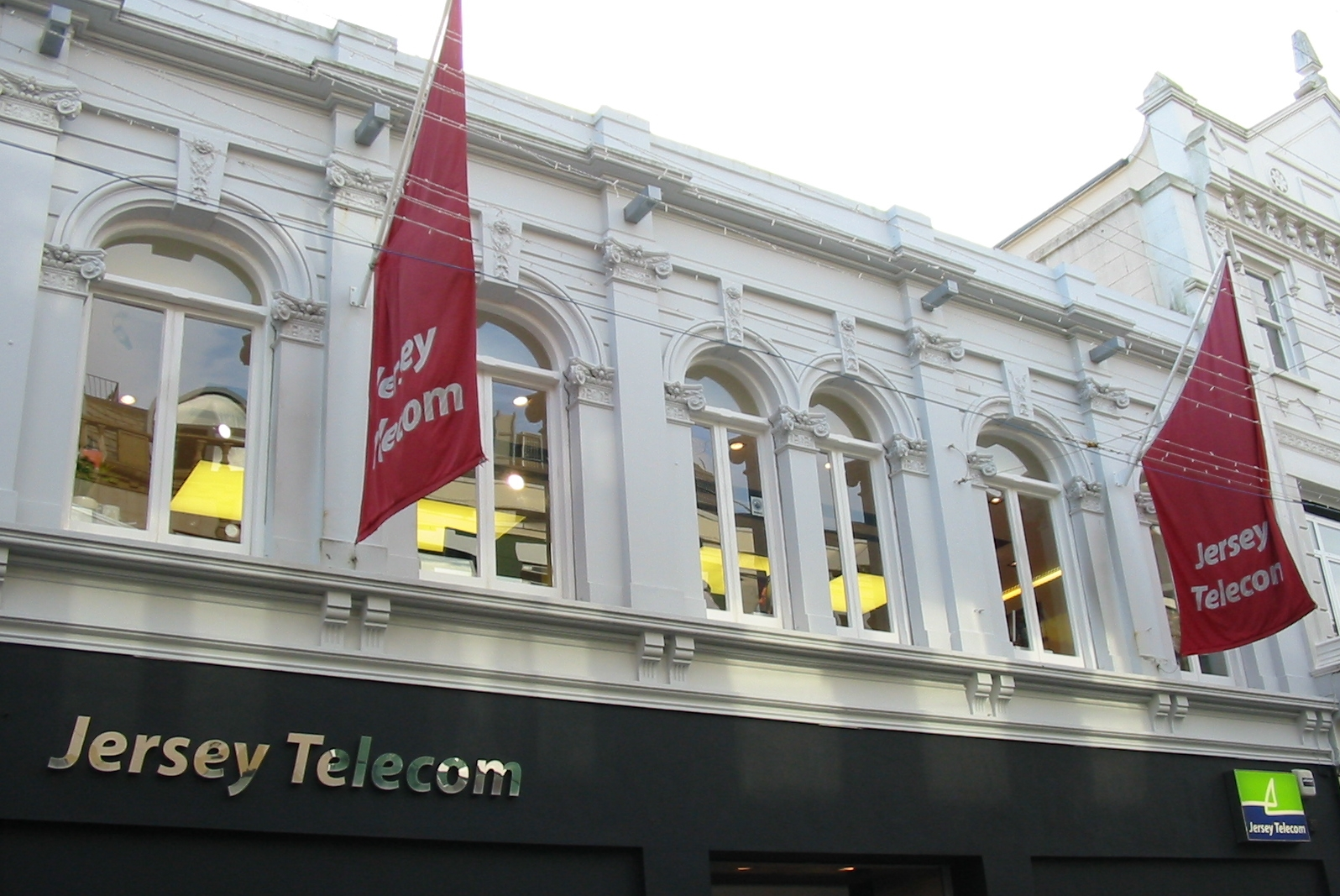
JT in Queen Street

=== Wave Telecom ===
JT Group has operated in the Bailiwick of Guernsey since 2002 through the subsidiary company "Wave Telecom Limited", a wholly owned subsidiary of the JT Group, which was later renamed JT with the rest of the company's properties.

=== JT Fibre ===
JT Fibre is a fibre to the home service, was initiated with a budget of £41.5m with £20m provided by the States of Jersey. The first homes were connected in February 2012. The project ran into difficulties in 2013 due to a dispute between JT and contractors and JT established a new subsidiary to take the programme forward. In November 2015, JT admitted that the project was behind schedule and could finish three years after its 2016 completion deadline. In January 2017, JT announced that the work was 70% complete. The project was delayed as the result of services having to be provided to additional new homes that had been built since the project began.

In 2018, JT announced that thanks to the completion of its full-fibre network, Jersey had become the first jurisdiction in the world where 100 percent of broadband users were on its fibre network. The JT Fibre project began in 2012 with a budget of £41.5m, of which £20m was provided by the Government of Jersey. The first properties were connected in February 2012, but the project ran into difficulties with JT defending the progress after criticism in the States Assembly. JT has laid over 3,000 km of individual fibre-optic cable to over 45,000 homes and businesses providing access, regardless of means, to the whole Island.

In January 2020, JT announced it was doubling broadband speeds from 250 Mbit/s to 500 Mbit/s for all subscribers. In March, following discussions with Digital Jersey and other telecom operators, JT increased speeds to 1 Gbit/s at no extra cost as part of measures to contain the spread of COVID-19.

As of 2021, JT has the fastest network in the world.

=== IoT ===
JT sold a majority stake in its Internet of Things business in June 2021 to family-backed private equity firm Perwyn. The business continues to operate from Jersey as Velos IoT.

== Partnerships and international business ==
In 2019, JT signed a partnership with Speednet Communications, the leading mobile network provider in Belize. The deal meant JT would provide a fully managed roaming service using its existing 2G, 3G and 4G roaming connectivity. The partnership added to JT's already wide roaming network that has access to over 700 networks around the world.

JT upgraded its mobile network to be able to cope with future demands and technologies by signing a deal with ECI to upgrade its optical network.

== Technology ==
=== JT Lab ===
JT Lab provides facilities for the trial and testing of telecoms related products in small-scale and live environments. JT Group is regulated by the Channel Islands Competition and Regulatory Authorities.

=== Gigabit Isles ===
In the early 2010s, JT created the Gigabit Isles project, in order to spread access to FTTP broadband to the full population if the Isles region, at various data rates.

=== 5G ===
Along with other mobile operators, JT has taken part in limited trials of 5G at two test sites, one in Jersey and the other Guernsey. Roll out of 5G is dependent on licences being issued by the telecoms regulator, the JCRA.

== Finance ==
=== Profits ===
In 2019, JT returned £17m in dividends to the Government of Jersey's Treasury, which was in line with previous years. However, the Jersey Evening Post reported a fall in profits which JT's CEO Graeme Millar explained was down to higher operating costs and investment in major projects and developments. In 2018, profits after tax were £2.2m, a drop of more than half. JT said cutting roaming charges had hit revenue and it had been expensive to increase the number of broadband users on unlimited contracts.

== See also ==
- Airtel-Vodafone
- List of mobile network operators in Europe
- Sure (company)
- Telecommunications in Jersey
