= Channel Islands Competition and Regulatory Authorities =

Antitrust regulator

The Channel Islands Competition and Regulatory Authorities (CICRA) was the name given to the combined Jersey Competition Regulatory Authority and the Guernsey Competition and Regulatory Authority, which operate in the Bailiwick of Guernsey and the Bailiwick of Jersey in the Channel Islands. CICRA existed from 2010 to 2020: the authorities for Guernsey and Jersey now function independently.

== History ==
Formed in December 2010, CICRA was responsible for administering and enforcing the Competition (Jersey) Law 2005 and The Competition (Guernsey) Ordinance 2012. The purpose of the legislation is to prevent consumers being harmed by anti-competitive or exploitative behaviour in the market.

The decision to form a joint body was taken because of the similarity of needs and the reduction in duplication through economies of scale. Resources available to CICRA were limited.

The joint body was disbanded in July 2020.

== Areas of responsibility ==
The areas of responsibility were:

- Competition law
  - Some areas of work are discretionary, others such as a duty to investigate mergers and acquisitions are statutory
- Telecommunications
  - Regulator
- Postal sectors
  - Regulator looking at quality and universal service obligations
- Electricity – Guernsey 2012
  - Regulator
- Ports – Jersey 2015
  - Economic regulatory authority, to protect and further the interests of users of port operations and where appropriate promote competition

== Board ==
CICRA's board comprised a chairman, three executive directors and three non-executive directors. There were fewer than ten staff spread between two offices in the two islands.

== Areas of contention ==
An investigation by CICRA into possible market abuse by a States of Guernsey contract in 2016 was blocked as the States refused to supply CICRA with the necessary funding. The investigation was dropped in January 2017.

The ownership of regulated companies by the governments, such as Jersey Post and Guernsey Electricity, could produce conflicts.
