= Sure (mobile network operator) =

Mobile phone provider in Jersey and Guernsey

Sure by Beyon
- Industry: Telecommunications
- Founded: 2007; 19 years ago
- Headquarters: St Peter Port, Guernsey, Channel Islands, UK
- Area served: Channel Islands (UK)
- Products: Mobile telephony; Wireless broadband; Internet services
- Website: sure.com

Sure, officially Sure by Beyon and formerly Airtel-Vodafone Limited is a mobile network operator located in Jersey and Guernsey (Channel Islands), and -until it was disbanded- regulated by the Channel Islands Competition and Regulatory Authorities. Until 2024, it was a joint venture between Bharti Airtel and Vodafone Group Plc.

In March 2008, nine months after first launching in Jersey, Airtel-Vodafone expanded operations to Guernsey. In November 2024, the firm was acquired by Sure, a subsidiary of Beyon located in the Channel Islands.

== See also ==
- Bharti Airtel
- Vodafone Group
- Telecommunications in Jersey
- List of mobile network operators in Europe
