= List of mobile network operators in Europe =

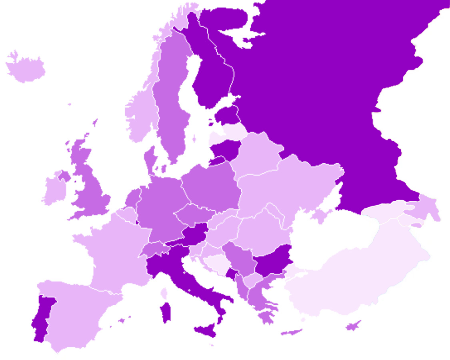
Mobile phone penetration in Europe based on available data between 2009 and 2012: > 140% 120–140% 100–120% < 100% No data

A mobile network operator, also known as a wireless service provider, wireless carrier, cellular company, or mobile network carrier is a provider of wireless communication services.

The main mobile network operators in Europe are listed below.

== Albania ==
Albania as per has 2.98 million subscribers, of whom 2.44 million are active users (101% penetration rate) (Q1 2026).

Active users are considered those who have communicated in the last three months. The regulatory authority for telecommunication in Albania is the AKEP.

In 2022 4iG group, owning ONE Telecommunications, acquired a majority stake of ALBtelecom Mobile, 80.27%, to a network merger in 2023.

Rank	Operator	Technology	Subscribers (in millions)	Ownership	MCC / MNC
1	One Albania • Includes the former ALBtelecom Mobile network.	900/1800 (GPRS, EDGE); 2100 MHz UMTS, HSDPA, HSUPA, HSPA+, DC-HSPA+ 800/1800/2100/2600 MHz LTE, LTE-A; VoLTE; 1800/3400/3500 MHz 5G NR	1.588 (Q1 2026)	4iG	27601; 27603
2	Vodafone Albania	900/1800 (GPRS, EDGE); 800/1800/2100/2600 MHz LTE, LTE-A; VoLTE, VoWiFi; 3600/3700 MHz 5G NR	1.397 (Q1 2026)	Vodafone Group plc	27602

== Andorra ==
Andorra has 88,109 mobile subscribers or about 113.63% mobile penetration.

Rank	Operator	Technology	Subscribers (in millions)	Ownership	MCC / MNC
1	Andorra Telecom (formerly Servei de Telecomunicacions d'Andorra)	900/1800 MHz GPRS; 900/2100 MHz UMTS, HSDPA; 800/1800/2100 MHz LTE-LTE-A; VoLTE; 3500 MHz - 5G NR	0.088 (2021)	Government of Andorra	21303

== Armenia ==
Armenia has 3.5 million subscribers in total, and a 120% penetration rate.

Rank	Operator	Technology	Subscribers (in millions)	Ownership	MCC / MNC
1	Viva	GSM-900/1800 MHz (GPRS, EDGE); UMTS-900/2100 MHz (Band: B1/B8) (UMTS, HSDPA); LTE, LTE-A, 5G, VoLTE, VoWiFi; LTE-1800/2600 MHz (Band: B3/B7) (LTE)	2.2 (Q1 2022)	Viva Armenia; Fedilco Group Limited (Zhe Zhang (75%) and Konstantin Sokolov (25%)) (80%) and Government of Armenia (20%)	28305
2	Team	GSM-900/1800 MHz (GPRS, EDGE); UMTS-900/2100 MHz (Band: B1/B8) (UMTS, HSDPA); LTE-LTE-A (900 MHz, 1800 MHz)	1.0 (Q2 2024)	Telecom Armenia CJSC	28301
3	Ucom	GSM-900/1800 MHz (GPRS, EDGE); UMTS-900/2100 MHz (Band: B1/B8) UMTS, HSDPA; LTE-LTE-A -1800/2600 MHz (Band: B3/B7) (LTE), 5G	0.7 (Q3 2025)	Ucom	28310

== Austria ==
Austria has 13.0 million assigned numbers, or a 151.0% penetration rate (Q4 2014).

The regulatory authority for telecommunication in Austria is the Austrian Regulatory Authority for Broadcasting and Telecommunications (RTR).

Rank	Operator	Technology	Subscribers (in millions)	Ownership	MCC / MNC
1	Magenta Telekom (formerly T-Mobile, max.mobil)	GSM-900/1800 (GPRS, EDGE); 800/900/1800/2100/2600 MHz LTE, LTE-A; VoLTE, VoWiFi; 700/3500 MHz 5G NR	6.605 (Q1 2026)	Deutsche Telekom AG	23203
2	A1	GSM-900/1800 (GPRS, EDGE); 800/1800/2600 MHz LTE, LTE-A; VoLTE, VoWiFi; 3500 MHz 5G NR	5.185 (including yesss!) (Q4 2025)	A1 Group (América Móvil (61,0%), ÖBAG (28.4%), institutional and others (7.5%), retail (3.1%)).	23201
3	Drei • Includes the previous Orange network.	GSM-900/1800 (GPRS, EDGE) (roams on Magenta Telekom's GSM network when needed); 900/1800/2100/2600 MHz LTE, LTE-A; VoLTE, VoWiFi; 3500 MHz 5G NR	2.810 (Q4 2025)	CK Hutchison Holdings	23205

== Azerbaijan ==
In December 2005, Azerbaijan had 2 million subscribers in total, a 25% penetration rate. In 2014, Azerbaijan had over 10 million subscribers in total, or a 130% penetration rate.

Rank	Operator	Technology	Subscribers (in millions)	Ownership	MCC / MNC
1	Azercell	GSM 900 MHz (GPRS, EDGE); 2100 MHz UMTS, HSDPA, HSUPA, HSPA, HSPA+, DC-HSPA+ 1800 MHz LTE	4.417 (April 2013)	AzInTelecom (state-owned company)	40001
2	Bakcell	GSM 900 MHz (GPRS, EDGE); 2100 MHz UMTS, HSDPA, HSUPA, HSPA, HSPA+, DC-HSPA+ 1800 MHz LTE	3.4	Neqsol Holding	40002
3	Nar	GSM 1800 MHz (GPRS, EDGE); 2100 MHz UMTS, HSDPA, HSUPA, HSPA, HSPA+, DC-HSPA+ 1800 MHz LTE	2.1 (March 2014)	Azerfon LLC	40004

== Belarus ==
Belarus has 12.0 million subscribers in total, or a 126% penetration rate in Q4 of 2020.

The regulatory authority for telecommunication in Belarus is the Ministry of Communications and Informatization.

Rank	Operator	Technology	Subscribers (in millions)	Ownership	MCC / MNC
1	MTS	GSM-900/1800 (GPRS, EDGE); 900/2100 MHz UMTS, HSDPA, HSUPA, HSPA+ 800/1800/2600 MHz LTE, LTE-A; VoLTE	5.6 (Q2 2025)	Beltelecom (51%); MTS (49%)	25702
2	A1 (formerly velcom)	GSM-900/1800 (GPRS, EDGE); 900/2100 MHz UMTS, HSDPA, HSUPA, DC-HSPA+ 800/1800/2600 MHz LTE, LTE-A; VoLTE, VoWiFi	4.959 (Q3 2024)	A1 Group	25701
3	Life	GSM-900/1800 (GPRS, EDGE); 2100 MHz UMTS, HSDPA, HSUPA, HSPA+ 800/1800/2600 MHz LTE, LTE-A	1.5 (Q2 2024)	Turkcell	25704

== Belgium ==
Belgium has 12.69 million active SIM cards (Q4 2025).

The regulatory authority for telecommunication in Belgium is the Belgian Institute for Postal Services and Telecommunications (BIPT). All figures include postpaid and prepaid subscribers and exclude M2M.

Rank	Operator	Technology	Subscribers (in millions)	Ownership	MCC / MNC
1	Proximus (formerly Belgacom)	900/1800 GSM (EDGE); 900/2100 MHz UMTS, DC-HSPA+ 800/1800/2600 MHz LTE, LTE-A; VoLTE; 2100/3500 MHz 5G NR	5.291 (Q3 2026)	Proximus Group N.V./S.A. (Government of Belgium 53.51%)	20601
2	Orange (formerly Mobistar, OBE)	900/1800 GSM (EDGE); 900/2100 MHz UMTS, DC-HSPA+ 800/1800/2600 MHz LTE, LTE-A; VoLTE, VoWiFi	3.810 (H1 2026)	Orange S.A. (76.29%), others (23.71%)	20610
3	Base/Telenet	900/1800 GSM (EDGE); 900/2100 MHz UMTS, DC-HSPA+ 800/1800/2600 MHz LTE, LTE-A; VoLTE, VoWiFi	2.821 (Q4 2025)	Telenet Group N.V./S.A. (Ziggo Group)	20620
4	DIGI	Roaming on Proximus LTE/LTE-A Network; 700/900/1800/2100/2600/3600 MHz; 5G NR; VoLTE	0.108 (Q2 2026)	51% Digi Communications N.V. 49% CityMesh (subsidiary of Cegeka Groep N.V.)	20612

== Bosnia and Herzegovina ==
In December 2022, Bosnia and Herzegovina had 3.811 million subscribers in total, or a 115% penetration rate.

The regulatory authority for telecommunication in Bosnia and Herzegovina is the Communications Regulatory Agency (Regulatorna agencija za komunikacije, RAK).

Rank	Operator	Technology	Subscribers in million	Ownership	MCC / MNC
1	BH Telecom (formerly GSM-BIH)	GSM-900 (GPRS, EDGE); 2100 MHz UMTS, HSPA, HSPA+ (3G shutdown: starting from March 2026); 1800 MHz LTE, LTE-A, VoLTE, eSIM	1.577 (Q2 2023)	Federation of Bosnia and Herzegovina (90%), free float (10%)	21890
2	m:tel (formerly MOBI'S)	GSM-900/1800 (GPRS, EDGE), 900/2100 MHz UMTS, HSPA; 800/1800 MHz LTE, LTE-A VoLTE, eSIM (postpaid only)	1.273 (Q2 2023)	Telekom Srbija (65%)	21805
3	HT ERONET (formerly HTmobile)	GSM-900/1800 (GPRS, EDGE), 900/2100 MHz UMTS, HSPA+ 800/1800 MHz LTE, LTE-A, eSIM	0.834 (Q2 2023)	Federation of Bosnia and Herzegovina (50.10%), Hrvatski Telekom (39.10%), Hrvatska pošta (5.23%), free float (5.57%)	21803

== Bulgaria ==
Bulgaria has 7,978,611 subscribers in total, or a 123.9% penetration rate according to the CRC annual report for 2024.

The regulatory authority for Telecommunication in Bulgaria is the Communications Regulation Commission (CRC).

Rank	Operator	Technology	Subscribers (in millions)	Coverage	Ownership	MCC / MNC
1	A1 (formerly Mtel, Mobiltel)	GSM-900 (GPRS, EDGE); 900 MHz UMTS, HSDPA, HSPA+ 800/900/1800/2100/2600 MHz LTE, LTE-A; VoLTE (postpaid only), VoWiFi (postpaid only), eSIM; 700/3600 MHz 5G NR	3.945 (FY 2025)	Link	A1 Group	28401
2	Vivacom (formerly Vivatel)	GSM-900 (GPRS, EDGE); 900 MHz UMTS, HSDPA, HSPA+ 700/800/900/1800/2100/2600 MHz LTE, LTE-A; VoLTE (postpaid only), VoWiFi (postpaid only), eSIM; 1800/3600 MHz 5G NR	3.354 (Q4 2023)	Link	United Group	28403
3	Yettel (formerly Telenor, Globul)	GSM-900 (GPRS, EDGE); 900 MHz UMTS, HSDPA, HSUPA, HSPA+ 800/900/1800/2100/2600 MHz LTE, LTE-A; VoLTE, ViLTE, eSIM; 700/2600/3600 MHz 5G NR	3.2 (FY 2025)	Link	e& PPF Telecom Group	28405

== Croatia ==
Croatia has 4,404,652 subscribers in total, or a 102.8% penetration rate. (Q4 2019)

The regulatory authority for telecommunication in Croatia is the Croatian Regulatory Authority for Network Industries.

Rank	Operator	Technology	Subscribers (in millions)	Ownership	MCC / MNC
1	Hrvatski Telekom (formerly T-Mobile, HTmobile, HT CRONET)	GSM-900 MHz (GPRS, EDGE); 3G shutdown: end of 2024; LTE, LTE-A, LTE-A Pro, VoLTE, VoWiFi, eSIM (postpaid only); 2100/3500 MHz - 5G NR	2.517 (Q1 2026)	Deutsche Telekom AG (53,8%)	21901
2	A1 (formerly vip)	GSM-900 MHz (GPRS, EDGE); 900 MHz UMTS, HSDPA, HSPA+ 700/800/1800/2100/2600 MHz LTE, LTE-A, LTE-A Pro, VoLTE (postpaid only), eSIM (postpaid only); 700/3600 MHz - 5G NR	1.990 (Q3 2021)	A1 Group	21910
3	Telemach (formerly Tele2)	GSM-900/1800 MHz (GPRS, EDGE); 900/2100 MHz UMTS, HSPA; 700/1800/2100/2600 MHz LTE, LTE-A 700/3400-3800 MHz - 5G NR eSIM (postpaid only)	1.00 (Q3 2021)	United Group	21902

== Cyprus ==
Cyprus has 1,392,480 subscribers in total, or a 151.7% penetration rate (excludes Northern Cyprus) (Q4 2022).

The regulatory authority for telecommunication in Cyprus (excluding Northern Cyprus) is OCECPR (Office of the Commissioner of Electronic Communications and Postal Regulation).

Rank	Operator	Technology	Subscribers (in millions)	Ownership	MCC / MNC
Mobile network operators in Cyprus (excludes Northern Cyprus)
1	Cyta	900/1800 MHz GSM (GPRS, EDGE); 900/2100 MHz UMTS, HSPA+ 800/1800/2100/2600 MHz LTE, LTE-A; VoLTE, VoWiFi, eSIM; 700/3500 MHz 5G NR	0.710 (Q4 2022)	Cyta (Government of Cyprus)	28001
2	Epic (formerly MTN, Areeba)	900/1800 MHz GSM (GPRS, EDGE); 900/2100 MHz UMTS, HSPA+ 800/1800/2100/2600 MHz LTE, LTE-A; VoLTE, eSIM; 700/3500 MHz 5G NR	0.399 (Q2 2025)	Monaco Telecom SAM	28010
3	PrimeTel (formerly as MVNO on Epic)	900/2100 MHz UMTS, HSPA+ 900/1800 MHz LTE, LTE-A; VoLTE, VoWiFi, eSIM (RAN sharing with Epic & roaming on Epic or Cyta when needed)	0.150 (Q4 2022)	PrimeTel PLC (Signal Capital Partners 100%)	28020
4	Cablenet (formerly Lemontel, as MVNO on Cyta)	800/2600/2100 MHz LTE, LTE-A, 5G NR eSIM (RAN sharing & roaming with Cyta when needed)	0.093 (Q4 2022)	Cablenet Communications Systems PLC (GO Malta 63.4%)	28022
Mobile network operators operating only in Turkish Republic of Northern Cyprus
1	Kuzey Kıbrıs Turkcell	900 MHz GSM (GPRS, EDGE); 900/2100 MHz UMTS, HSDPA, HSUPA, HSPA, HSPA+, DC-HSPA+ 800/1800/2100/2600 MHz LTE, LTE+ VoLTE, VoWiFi, eSIM; 5G (testing)	0.576 (Q2 2023)	Turkcell A.Ş.	28601
2	Telsim Vodafone	900 MHz GSM (GPRS, EDGE); 2100 MHz UMTS, HSDPA, HSUPA, HSPA, HSPA+, DC-HSPA+ 800/1800/2100/2600 MHz LTE, LTE+ VoLTE, VoWiFi, eSIM; 5G (testing)	0.382 (Q2 2023)	Vodafone Turkey A.Ş.	28602

== Czech Republic ==
The Czech Republic has 16.121 million subscribers in total, or a 151% penetration rate (December 2019).

Rank	Operator	Technology	Subscribers (in millions)	Ownership	MCC / MNC
1	T-Mobile (formerly Paegas)	GSM-900/1800 MHz (GPRS, EDGE); 700/800/1800/2100/2600 MHz LTE, LTE-A, VoLTE, ViLTE, VoWiFi; 700/1800/2100/3500 MHz 5G NR	6.632 (Q1 2026)	Deutsche Telekom AG	23001
2	O_{2} (formerly Eurotel, Český Telecom)	GSM-900/1800 MHz (GPRS, EDGE); 700/800/900/1800/2100/2600 MHz LTE, LTE-A, VoLTE, VoWiFi; 700/1800/2100 (Prague Metro only) /3500 MHz 5G NR	5.987 (Q2 2021)	PPF	23002
3	Vodafone (formerly Oskar)	GSM-900/1800 MHz (GPRS, EDGE); 800/900/1800/2100/2600 MHz LTE, LTE-A, VoLTE, ViLTE, VoWiFi; 700/1800/2100/3500 MHz 5G NR	4.180 (Q1 2027)	Vodafone Group plc	23003

== Denmark ==
Denmark has 8.208 million subscribers in total, or a 146% penetration rate (Q1 2014)

In 2011, Denmark liquidated IT- og Telestyrelsen, it's telecommunications regulator.

Former regulator's tasks are divided among four institutions:

- Økonomi- og Indenrigsministeriet
- Finansministeriet
- Forsvarsministeriet
- Erhvervsministeriet

Rank	Operator	Technology	Subscribers (in millions)	Ownership	MCC / MNC
1	TDC	GSM-900/1800 (GPRS, EDGE); 800/2600 MHz LTE; VoLTE; 3500 MHz - 5G NR	▲3.895 (Q4 2025)	Macquarie Group and Danish pension funds (PFA, PKA, ATP)	23801
2	Norlys (formerly Telia)	900/1800 GSM (GPRS, EDGE); 900/1800/2100/2600 MHz LTE; VoLTE; 3500 MHz - 5G NR (shares network with Telenor)	▼ ~1.9 (Q4 2024)	Norlys a.m.b.a.	23820
3	Telenor (formerly Sonofon)	900/1800 GSM (GPRS, EDGE) 800/900/1800/2100 MHz LTE; VoLTE; 3500 MHz - 5G NR (shares network with Norlys)	▲1.700 (Q4 2025)	Telenor	23802
4	3	1800/2100/2600 MHz LTE; 3500 MHz - 5G NR; VoLTE, VoWiFi (Roams on TDC's GSM / LTE network where 3 does not reach)	1.659 (Q4 2024)	CK Hutchison Holdings (60%), Investor AB (40%)	23806

== Estonia ==
Estonia has 2.524 million subscribers in total, or a 188% penetration rate (December 2008).

Rank	Operator	Technology	Subscribers (in millions)	Ownership	MCC / MNC
1	Telia (formerly EMT)	GSM-900/1800 (EDGE); 800/1800/2100/2600 MHz LTE; VoLTE; 700/3500 MHz - 5G NR 3G (UMTS, HSPA) has been shut down in 2023	1.274 (Q1 2024)	Telia Company	24801
2	Elisa (formerly Radiolinja)	GSM-900/1800 (EDGE); 800/1800/2100/2600 MHz LTE; VoLTE; 700/3500 MHz - 5G NR	0.701 (Q1 2024)	Elisa	24802
3	Tele2 (formerly Q-GSM)	GSM-900/1800 (EDGE); 900/2100 MHz UMTS, HSPA; 800/1800/2100 MHz LTE 700/3500 MHz - 5G NR	0.462 (Q4 2025)	Tele2	24803
8	Signalmover	MVNO		Signalmover OÜ	24808

== Faroe Islands ==
The Faroe Islands have 61,388 subscribers, or a 126% penetration rate (population 48,652) (2020).

Rank	Operator	Technology	Subscribers (in millions)	Ownership	MCC / MNC
1	Føroya Tele	GSM-900; 900/2100 MHz UMTS; 1800 MHz LTE	0.045 (74%)	Government of Faroe Islands	28801
2	Nema (formerly Hey, Vodafone, Kall)	GSM-900; 2100 MHz UMTS; 1800 MHz LTE	0.013 (25%)	Nema	28802
3	Tosa	GSM-900; 2100 MHz UMTS; 1800 MHz LTE	0.0 (0%)	Tosa	28803

== Finland ==
Finland has 7.700 million subscribers in total, or a 144.59% penetration rate (December 2009).

Rank	Operator	Technology	Subscribers (in millions)	Ownership	MCC / MNC
1	Elisa (formerly Radiolinja)	GSM-900/1800 MHz (EDGE); 900/2100 MHz UMTS, HSPA; 800/1800/2600 MHz LTE, LTE-A; VoLTE; 3500 MHz - 5G NR	▼3.151 (Q4 2025)	Elisa	24405; 24406; 24421
2	DNA	GSM-900/1800 MHz (EDGE); 900/2100 MHz UMTS, HSPA; 700/800/1800/2100/2600 MHz LTE, LTE-A; VoLTE, VoWiFi; 3500 MHz - 5G NR	▲2.808 (Q4 2025)	Telenor	24403; 24404; 24412; 24413; 24436 (SYV)
3	Telia (formerly Telecom Finland, Sonera)	GSM-900/1800 MHz (EDGE); 900/2100 MHz UMTS, HSPA; 800/1800/2600 MHz LTE, LTE-A; VoLTE; 3500 MHz - 5G NR	▼2.410 (Q4 2025)	Telia Company	24420; 24436 (SYV); 24491
4	Ålcom (formerly ÅMT / Ålands Mobiltelefon)	GSM-900 MHz (EDGE); 900/2100 MHz UMTS, HSPA; 800/1800/2600 MHz LTE, LTE-A	Not yet available	Mariehamns Telefon, Ålands Telefonandelslag	24414

== France ==
France has 85.3 million SIM cards in service, or a 123.4% penetration rate (Q3 2026).

The regulatory authority for telecommunication in France is ARCEP. All figures include postpaid and prepaid subscribers and exclude M2M.

Rank	Operator	Technology	Subscribers (in millions)	Ownership	MCC / MNC
1	Orange (formerly Orange-Itineris, Itineris)	900/2100 MHz UMTS, HSPA, HSPA+, DC-HSPA+ 700/800/1800/2100/2600 MHz LTE, LTE-A; 2100/3500 MHz 5G NR; VoLTE, VoWiFi,VoNR	26.009 (Q3 2026)	Orange S.A.	20801
2	SFR	900/1800 MHz GSM (GPRS, EDGE); 900/2100 MHz UMTS, HSPA, HSPA+, DC-HSPA+ 700/800/1800/2100/2600 MHz LTE, LTE-A; 2100/3500 MHz 5G NR; VoLTE, VoWiFi	19.096 (Q2 2026)	Altice France	20810
3	Bouygues Telecom	900 MHz GSM (GPRS, EDGE); 900/2100 MHz UMTS, HSPA, HSPA+ 700/800/1800/2100/2600 MHz LTE, LTE-A; 2100/3500 MHz 5G NR; VoLTE, VoWiFi	19.015 (Q3 2026)	Bouygues Group (90.53%), JCDecaux (9,47%)	20820
4	Free Mobile	900 MHz GSM (GPRS, EDGE); 900/2100 MHz UMTS, HSPA, HSPA+ (Roaming on Orange 2G/3G when needed, limited to 384 kbit/s download, 384 kbit/s upload); 700/900/1800/2100/2600 MHz LTE, LTE-A; 700/2100/3500 MHz 5G NR; VoLTE, VoWiFi,VoNR	15.8 (Q2 2026)	Iliad	20815

== Georgia ==
As of November 2024, Georgia has 5,623,128 subscribers in total.

The regulatory authority for telecommunication in Georgia is the Georgian National Communications Commission.

Rank	Operator	Technology	Subscribers (in millions)	Ownership	MCC / MNC
1	Magticom	GSM-900/1800 MHz (GPRS, EDGE); 2100 MHz UMTS, HSDPA, HSUPA, HSPA, HSPA+, DC-HSPA+ 800/1800/2100 MHz LTE, LTE Advanced, VoLTE 5G is on FDD 700 MHz (N28) with a bandwidth of 20 MHz (2x10MHz), FDD 2600 MHz (N7) with a bandwidth of 60 MHz (2x30MHz) and TDD 3500 MHz (N78) with a bandwidth of 100 MHz. Magticom currently has the biggest 5G coverage in the country.	2.332 (November 2024)	International Tellcell LLC	28202
2	Silknet (formerly Geocell)	GSM-900/1800 MHz (GPRS, EDGE); 2100 MHz UMTS, HSDPA, HSUPA, HSPA, HSPA+, DC-HSPA+, CDMA2000, EVDO Rev. A 2300 MHz TD-LTE, LTE Advanced, LTE Advanced Pro; 800/900/1800 MHz LTE 5G–2100 MHz (Only in central Tbilisi from Freedom Square to Bagebi). Silknet has not participated in any of the 5G license auctions announced by the GNCC and has chosen to instead use its existing neutral license for 2100 MHz. Silknet currently remains the only MNO in Georgia without 5G-specific licenses and has the smallest 5G coverage.	1.965 (November 2024)	Silk Road Group	28201
3	Cellfie (formerly Beeline)	GSM-900/1800 MHz (GPRS, EDGE); 2100 MHz UMTS, HSDPA, HSUPA, HSPA, HSPA+, DC-HSPA+ 800/1800 MHz LTE, LTE Advanced, VoLTE, VoWifi coming soon 5G – Currently in skiing resorts Bakuriani and Gudauri, seaside resorts Batumi, Gonio, Kvariati, Shekvetili, Kobuleti, as well as some of Tbilisi's neighbourhoods, such as Didube and Didi Dighomi. There is also coverage in Zugdidi. 5G is on 10 MHz (2X5 MHz) frequency resource, within the Uplink 703 - 708 MHz and Downlink 758 - 763 MHz resources; 50 MHz frequency resource within the 3550-3600 MHz resource. Cellfie also owns licenses for 2100 MHz and 2600 MHz.	1.308 (November 2024)	CBS Group	28204
Operators in Abkhazia
	Aquafon	GSM-900/1800 MHz; 2100 MHz UMTS; 800 MHz LTE	N/A	Aquafon JSC	28967 (MCC is not listed by ITU)
	A-Mobile	GSM-900/1800 MHz; 2100 MHz UMTS; 800/1800 MHz LTE	N/A	A-Mobile LLSC	28988 (MCC is not listed by ITU)
Operators in South Ossetia
	MegaFon	GSM-900/1800 MHz; 900/1800 MHz UMTS; 800/1800 MHz LTE	N/A	CJSC Ostelkom (branding licence agreement with MegaFon)	25002

== Germany ==
Germany has 114.1 million subscribers in total, or a 140% penetration rate (December 2011).

The regulatory authority for telecommunication in Germany is the Bundesnetzagentur (BNetzA).

Rank	Operator	Technology	Subscribers (in millions)	Ownership	MCC / MNC
1	Telekom (formerly D1 DeTeMobil, T-Mobile)	900/1800 MHz GSM (EDGE); 700/800/900/1500/1800/2100/2600 MHz LTE, LTE-A; 700/2100/3600 MHz 5G NR; VoLTE, VoWiFi, AML, RCS	75.320 (Q1 2026)	Deutsche Telekom AG	26201
2	O_{2} (formerly VIAG Interkom) • Includes the former E-Plus network.	900/1800 MHz GSM (GPRS, EDGE); 700/800/900/1800/2100/2600 MHz LTE, LTE-A; 700/1800/3600 MHz 5G NR; VoLTE, VoWiFi, AML, RCS	31.799 (Q3 2026)	Telefónica S.A. (96.8%), free float (3.2%)	26203
3	Vodafone Germany (formerly D2 Mannesmann)	900 MHz GSM (GPRS, EDGE); 700/800/900/1800/2100/2600 MHz LTE, LTE-A; 700/1800/3600 MHz 5G NR; VoLTE, VoWiFi, VoNR, AML, RCS	28.675 (Q1 2027)	Vodafone Group plc	26202
4	1&1	2600 MHz LTE; 3600 MHz 5G NR (Roams on Vodafone where there is no 1&1 coverage); VoLTE, VoWiFi, AML	12.380 (Q3 2024)	United Internet AG (86,46%), free float (13,40%), Norman Rentrop (4,51%), 1&1 AG (0,14%), Management board (0,07%)	26223

== Gibraltar ==
Gibraltar, the British overseas territory, has 0.028 million subscribers in total, or a 92.12% penetration rate (December 2009).

Rank	Operator	Technology	Subscribers (in millions)	Ownership	MCC / MNC
1	Gibtelecom	GSM-900/1800; 2100 MHz UMTS; 800/2600 MHz LTE, LTE-A	0.022	Government of Gibraltar	26601

== Greece ==
In 2024, Greece had 11.41 million subscribers in total, or a 109% penetration rate. The regulatory authority for telecommunications in Greece is the Hellenic Telecommunications and Post Commission (EETT).

Rank	Operator	Technology	Subscribers (in millions)	Ownership	MCC / MNC
1	Telekom GR (formerly Cosmote)	900 MHz GSM (EDGE); 800/1800/2600 MHz LTE, LTE-A; VoLTE, VoWiFi, VoNR; 700/2100/2600/3500 MHz 5G NR	7.055 (Q1 2026)	OTE A.E. (Deutsche Telekom AG 55,97%)	20201, 20202
2	Vodafone (formerly Panafon) • Includes the previous Cyta Hellas network.	900/1800 MHz GSM (EDGE); 800/1800/2100/2600 MHz LTE, LTE-A; VoLTE, VoWiFi; 2100/3500 MHz 5G NR	3.927 (Q2 2026)	Vodafone Group plc	20205 (Vodafone), 20214 (Cyta Hellas)
3	Nova (formerly Telestet, TIM, Wind) • Includes the previous Q-Telecom network.	900/1800 MHz GSM (EDGE); 800/1800/2100/2600 MHz LTE, LTE-A; VoLTE, VoWiFi; 2100/3500 MHz 5G NR	3.200 (Q3 2023)	United Group	20209 (Q-Telecom), 20210 (Nova)

== Guernsey ==
The British Crown dependency Guernsey has 0.055 million subscribers in total, or a 95% penetration rate (December 2005).

Rank	Operator	Technology	Subscribers (in millions)	Ownership	MCC / MNC
1	Sure	GSM-900; 2100 MHz UMTS; LTE	Not yet available	Batelco	23455
2	JT	GSM-1800; 2100 MHz UMTS LTE	Not yet available	JT Group	23450
3	Airtel-Vodafone	GSM-1800; 2100 MHz UMTS LTE	0.45	Batelco	23403

== Hungary ==
Hungary has 11.8 million subscribers in total (December 2017).

The regulatory authority for telecommunication in Hungary is NMHH – Nemzeti Média-, és Hírközlési Hatóság.

Rank	Operator	Technology	Subscribers (in millions)	Ownership	MCC / MNC
1	Magyar Telekom (formerly Westel 900, Westel, T-Mobile)	GSM-900/1800 MHz (GPRS, EDGE); 700/800/1800/2600 MHz LTE, LTE-A, VoLTE, VoWiFi (LTE 800 MHz is in cooperating with Yettel); 700 (DSS) /2100/3500 MHz 5G NR	6.583 (Q1 2026)	Deutsche Telekom AG (67,1%)	21630
2	Yettel (formerly Pannon GSM, Pannon, Telenor HU)	GSM-900/1800 (GPRS, EDGE); 700/800/900/1800/2100/2600 MHz LTE, LTE-A, VoLTE, VoWiFi (LTE 800 MHz is in cooperating with Magyar Telekom); 3500 MHz 5G NR/5G SA	3.449 (Q2 2021)	e& PPF Telecom Group	21601
3	One (formerly Vodafone)	• Includes the previous UPC Hungary and DIGI Mobile networks too. GSM-900/1800 MHz (GPRS, EDGE); 700/800/900/1800/2100/2600 MHz LTE, LTE-A VoLTE, VoWiFi; 700 MHz 5G NR (DSS)	3.003 (Q3 2023)	4iG	21670

== Iceland ==
Iceland has 0.470 million subscribers in total, or a 129.19% penetration rate (July 2019).

Rank	Operator	Technology	Subscribers (in millions)	Ownership	MCC / MNC
1	Síminn (formerly Landssíminn)	900/2100 MHz UMTS; 700/1800/2600 MHz LTE; VoLTE; 3600 MHz 5G NR	0.173 (July 2019)	Síminn	27401
2	Nova	2100 MHz UMTS, HSDPA; 1800 MHz LTE; VoLTE; 3500 MHz 5G NR	0.155 (July 2019)	Nova	27411
3	Sýn (formerly Vodafone, Og Vodafone, Íslandssími)	2100 MHz UMTS; 800/1800 MHz LTE; 3500 MHz 5G NR VoLTE	0.130 (July 2019)	Free float	27402

== Ireland ==
As the end of March 2022 Ireland had 8.117 million mobile subscribers in total, representing a 158.4% penetration rate.

If mobile broadband and M2M subscriptions are excluded, the total number of mobile subscribers was 5.414 million, representing a 105.6% penetration rate.

The regulatory authority for telecommunication in Ireland is the Commission for Communications Regulation (ComReg).

Rank	Operator	Technology	Subscribers (in millions)	Ownership	MCC / MNC
1	Three • Includes the previous O_{2} network	900/1800 MHz GSM (GPRS, EDGE); 900/2100 MHz UMTS, HSPA, HSPA+, DC-HSPA+ 800/1800 MHz LTE, LTE-A; 700/2100 MHz LTE, LTE-A (Operating on a temporary licence); 1800/3500 MHz 5G NR; VoLTE, VoWiFi, AML, eSIM	4.942 (Q4 2024)	CK Hutchison Holdings	27205 (Three), 27202 (O_{2})
2	Vodafone (formerly Eircell)	900/1800 MHz GSM (GPRS, EDGE); 900/2100 MHz UMTS, HSPA, HSPA+, DC‑HSPA+ * 800/1800 MHz LTE, LTE-A; 700/2100 MHz LTE, LTE-A (Operating on a temporary licence); 1800/3500 MHz 5G NR; VoLTE, VoWiFi, RCS, AML, eSIM * 3G Network has been fully shutdown in 2024	2.092 (Q1 2027)	Vodafone Group plc	27201
3	eir (formerly Meteor)	900/1800 MHz GSM (GPRS, EDGE); 900/2100 MHz UMTS, HSPA, HSPA+, DC-HSPA+ 800/1800 MHz LTE, LTE-A; 700/2100 MHz LTE, LTE-A (Operating on a temporary licence); 1800/3500 MHz 5G NR; VoLTE, VoWiFi, AML	1.560 (Q3 2025); 1.164 (excluding MBB and M2M) (Q2 2025)	Iliad (31.6%), NJJ (32.9%)	27203

== Isle of Man ==
The British Crown dependency Isle of Man has an unknown number of subscribers in total and an unknown percentage penetration rate.

Rank	Operator	Technology	Subscribers (in millions)	Ownership	MCC / MNC
1	Manx Telecom	GSM-900; 2100 MHz UMTS; 800/1800 MHz LTE	Not yet available	Basalt Investment Partners	23458
2	Sure	GSM-900/1800; 2100 MHz UMTS 800/1800 MHzLTE, LTE-A	Not yet available	Batelco	23436

== Italy ==
As of September 2025, Italy has 110.5 million active mobile SIMs in total (79.3 million human SIMs and 31.3 million M2M SIMs). The country's telecom regulator is AGCOM.

In 2016 3 Italy and Wind agreed to complete a merger that was approved by European and national authorities, and since March 2020 all consumer and business offers are sold under the new brand Wind Tre.

A new operator, Iliad entered the Italian market in May 2018 as a consequence of this merger.

In 2024 Swisscom acquired Vodafone Italy from Vodafone Group with the aim of merging it with its subsidiary Fastweb.

The subscriber figures below refer to human SIMs (excluding M2M) and are approximate, derived from AGCOM's human-SIM totals and market shares.

Rank	Operator	Technology	Subscribers (human SIMs, millions)	Ownership	MCC / MNC
1	Fastweb + Vodafone (reported by AGCOM as Fastweb+Vodafone)	900 MHz GSM (GPRS, EDGE); 700/800/900/1500/1800/2100/2600 MHz LTE, LTE-A; 700/2100/3700/28000 MHz 5G NR; VoLTE, VoWiFi, AML	≈23.7 (Sep 2025) (AGCOM notes include ho-mobile within the group)	Swisscom	222 10; 222 08
2	TIM (formerly SIP)	900 MHz GSM (GPRS, EDGE); 700/800/900/1500/1800/2100/2600 MHz LTE, LTE-A; 700/2100/3700/28000 MHz 5G NR; VoLTE, VoWiFi, AML	≈20.5 (Sep 2025) (Includes Kena Mobile)	TIM Group	222 01
3	Wind Tre (formerly 3 Italy and Wind)	900 MHz GSM (GPRS, EDGE), UMTS, HSPA, HSPA+ 800/1800/2100/2600 MHz LTE, LTE-A; 1800/2600/3500/28000 MHz 5G NR; VoLTE, VoWiFi, AML	≈19.1 (Sep 2025) (Includes Very Mobile)	CK Hutchison Holdings	222 88; 222 99
4	Iliad	Roaming on Wind Tre 2G; 900 MHz UMTS, HSPA, HSPA+ 700/1800/2100/2600 MHz LTE, LTE-A (RAN sharing on Wind Tre where needed); 700/3500/28000 MHz 5G NR; AML, VoLTE	≈8.9 (Sep 2025)	Iliad SA	222 50

== Jersey ==
The British Crown dependency Jersey.

Rank	Operator	Technology	Subscribers (in millions)	Ownership	MCC / MNC
1	JT	GSM-900/1800; 2100 MHz UMTS; 800/1800/2600 MHz LTE	Not yet available	JT Group	23450
2	Sure	GSM-900/1800; 2100 MHz UMTS LTE	Not yet available	Batelco	23455
3	Airtel-Vodafone	GSM-900/1800; 2100 MHz UMTS LTE	0.45	Batelco	23403

== Kosovo ==
Kosovo has 1.9 million subscribers in total, or a 103,4% penetration rate (January 2024).

The regulatory authority for telecommunications in Kosovo is ARKEP.

Rank	Operator	Technology	Subscribers (in millions)	Ownership	MCC / MNC
1	Vala	GSM-900/1800; 2100 MHz UMTS; 800/1800/2600 MHz LTE	0.792 (Q2 2024)	Telecom of Kosovo	22101
2	IPKO	GSM-900/1800; 2100 MHz UMTS LTE	1.057 (Q2 2024)	Telekom Slovenije	22102
3	MTS DOO	GSM-900/1800; 2100 MHz UMTS LTE	0.054 (Q2 2024)	Telekom Srbija	22103

== Latvia ==
Latvia has 2.243 million subscribers in total, or a 99.72% penetration rate (December 2009).

Rank	Operator	Technology	Subscribers (in millions)	Ownership	MCC / MNC
1	LMT	GSM-900/1800 MHz; 900/2100 MHz UMTS, DC-HSPA+ 700/800/1500/1800/2100/2300/2600 MHz LTE, LTE-A; 3500 MHz 5G NR VoLTE	1.451 (Q1 2024)	Telia (49%), Tet (Possessor (51%) and Telia (49%)) (23%), Latvian State Radio and Television Centre (LVRTC) (23%), Possessor (5%)	24701
2	Tele2	GSM-900/1800 MHz; 900/2100 MHz UMTS; 800/1800/2100/2600 MHz LTE, LTE-A; 700/1500/3500 MHz - 5G NR	1.065 (Q3 2024)	Tele2	24702
3	Bitė	GSM-900 MHz; 900/2100 MHz UMTS, HSPA+ 700/800/1800/2100/2300/2600 MHz LTE, LTE-A; 1500/3500 MHz - 5G NR	0.554 (Q1 2024)	Providence Equity Partners	24705
4	Triatel	450 MHz CDMA2000			24703
5	Xomobile	International mobile network based in Latvia			24709

== Liechtenstein ==
Liechtenstein has 0.039 million subscribers in total, or a 105% penetration rate (April 2015).

Rank	Operator	Technology	Subscribers (in millions)	Ownership	MCC / MNC
1	FL1 (formerly Mobilkom Liechtenstein AG)	GSM-900/1800; 2100 MHz UMTS; 800/2100/2600 MHz LTE	not available	State-owned	29505
2	7acht (formerly Orange FL)	GSM-900/1800; 2100 MHz UMTS; 1800/2100/2600 MHz LTE	not available	Salt Mobile	29502
3	Swisscom FL	GSM-900/1800; 2100 MHz UMTS; 900/1800/2100 MHz LTE; VoLTE	not available	Swisscom	29501

The Liechtenstein mobile phone system is attached to Switzerland, and customers of these three providers can roam on Swiss networks without additional fees.

== Lithuania ==
Lithuania has 4.49 million subscribers in total, or a 161% penetration rate (Q4 2023).

Each of the three largest network operators have flanker brands – Pildyk (Tele2), Ežys (Telia) and Labas (Bitė).

The regulator is Ryšių Reguliavimo Tarnyba (RRT).

Rank	Operator	Technology	Subscribers (in millions)	Ownership	MCC / MNC
1	Tele2	GSM-900/1800 MHz (GPRS, EDGE); 700/800/900/1500/1800/2100/2600 MHz LTE, LTE-A; VoLTE, VoWIFI 700 MHz, 3500 MHz - 5G NR	1.94 (Q3 2025)	Tele2	24603
2	Telia Lietuva (formerly Omnitel, Teo LT)	GSM-900/1800 MHz (GPRS, EDGE); 700/800/900/1500*/1800/2100/2600 MHz LTE, LTE-A; VoLTE, VoWIFI 700 MHz, 3500 MHz - 5G NR	1.71 (Q3 2025)	Telia Company	24601
3	Bitė • includes the previous Mezon network.	GSM-900/1800 MHz (GPRS, EDGE); 700/800/900/1800/2100/2300/2600 MHz LTE, LTE-A; VoLTE, VoWIFI 2300 MHz TDD, 2600 MHz TDD - 5G NR	1.19 (Q1 2024)	Providence Equity Partners	24602; 24608 • includes the previous Mezon network.

== Luxembourg ==
Luxembourg has 1,016,900 SIM cards excluding M2M, or a 149% penetration rate, plus 200,000 M2M SIM cards (end of 2025).

The regulatory authority for telecommunication in Luxembourg is the Institut Luxembourgeois de Régulation (ILR). Operators do not publish their subscribers excluding M2M; the figures below apply the ILR market shares (subscribers excluding M2M SIM cards) to this total.

Rank	Operator	Technology	Subscribers (in millions)	Ownership	MCC / MNC
1	POST	GSM-900/1800; 2100 MHz UMTS, HSDPA; 1800 MHz LTE; 3500 MHz - 5G NR	0.512 (Q4 2025) calculated from 50.3% market share	POST Luxembourg	27001
2	Tango	GSM-900/1800; 2100 MHz UMTS, HSPA+ 1800 MHz LTE; VoLTE; 3500 MHz - 5G NR	0.335 (Q4 2025) calculated from 32.9% market share	Proximus Group	27077
3	Orange	GSM-1800 (EDGE); 2100 MHz UMTS, DC-HSPA+ 1800 MHz LTE; 3500 MHz - 5G NR	0.161 (Q4 2025) calculated from 15.8% market share; 0.252 incl. M2M (H1 2026)	Orange Belgium (Orange S.A. group)	27099
4	Luxembourg Online	2100 MHz UMTS, HSDPA	n/a included in the 1.0% of other operators	Luxembourg Online	27005

== Malta ==
Malta has 0.702 million subscribers in total, or a 130.19% penetration rate (June 2023).

Rank	Operator	Technology	Subscribers (in millions)	Ownership	MCC / MNC
1	Epic (formerly Telecell, Vodafone)	GSM 900/1800 MHz (GPRS); 900/2100 MHz UMTS, HSDPA, HSUPA; 800/1800/2600 MHz LTE, LTE-A, LTE-A Pro; 3500 MHz - 5G NR	0.341 (June 2025)	Monaco Telecom	27801
2	GO (formerly MALTACOM)	GSM 900/1800 MHz (GPRS, EDGE); 900/2100 MHz UMTS, HSDPA; 800/1800/2600 MHz LTE, LTE-A, LTE-A Pro; 3500 MHz - 5G NR	0.279 (June 2025)	Tunisie Telecom (65.42%)	27821
3	Melita	2100 MHz UMTS, HSDPA; 800/1800 MHz LTE, LTE-A Pro; 3500 MHz - 5G NR	0.173 (June 2025)	Goldman Sachs Alternatives	27877

== Moldova ==
Moldova has 4.263 million subscribers in total, or a 120% penetration rate (2012).

The country's telecommunications regulator is ANRCETI.

Rank	Operator	Technology	Subscribers (in millions)	Ownership	MCC / MNC
1	Orange	GSM-900/1800 MHz (GPRS, EDGE); 900/2100 MHz UMTS, HSDPA, HSUPA, HSPA, HSPA+, DC-HSPA+ 800/1800/2600 MHz LTE, LTE-A; VoLTE; 2100/3500 MHz - 5G NR	2.097 (Q3 2021)	Orange S.A.	25901
2	Moldcell	GSM-900 MHz (GPRS, EDGE); 2100 MHz UMTS, HSDPA, HSUPA, HSPA, HSPA+, DC-HSPA+ 800/1800/2100/2600 MHz LTE; VoLTE; 3500 MHz - 5G NR	1.4 (2020)	CG Corp Global	25902
3	Moldtelecom	900/2100 MHz UMTS, HSDPA, HSUPA, HSPA, HSPA+, DC-HSPA+ 700/1800/2100/2600 MHz LTE, LTE-A 3500 MHz - 5G NR	0.459 (2020)	Moldtelecom	25903,25905,25999
Operators in Transnistria
1	Interdnestrcom	800 MHz LTE; VoLTE	0.291 (2012)	Sheriff	25906

== Monaco ==
Monaco has 0.023 million subscribers on the Monaco Telecom network, or a 70.1% penetration rate (December 2009).

Rank	Operator	Technology	Subscribers (in millions)	Ownership	MCC / MNC
1	Monaco Telecom	900/2100 MHz UMTS; 700/800/1800/2100/2600 MHz LTE; 700/3500 MHz 5G NR; VoLTE, VoWiFi	0.021	NJJ 55%, Société Nationale de Financement 45%	21210

== Montenegro ==
Montenegro has 1.13 million subscribers in total, or a 182.96% penetration rate (December 2018).

The regulatory authority for telecommunication in Montenegro is Agency for Electronic Communications and Postal Activity EKIP.

Rank	Operator	Technology	Subscribers (in millions)	Ownership	MCC / MNC
1	M:TEL	900 MHz GSM; 800/1800/2600 MHz LTE; 700/3600 MHz 5G NR	41% (Dec 2025)	51% Telekom Srbija, 49% Telekom Srpske	29703
2	Crnogorski Telekom	GSM 900/1800 MHz (GPRS, EDGE); 800/1800/2100/2600 MHz LTE; 700/2100/3500 MHz 5G NR	36% (Dec 2025)	Hrvatski Telekom (76,53%) (Deutsche Telekom AG 53,8%)	29702
3	One Montenegro	GSM 900/1800 (GPRS, EDGE); 900/2100 MHz UMTS, HSDPA, HSUPA, HSPA+ 700/900/1800/2100/2600 MHz LTE; 700/2100/3600 MHz 5G NR	23% (Dec 2025)	4iG	29701

== Netherlands ==
The Netherlands has 22.12 million subscribers in total, or a 125.7% penetration rate (Q1 2023).

The regulatory authorities for telecommunication in the Netherlands are the Netherlands Authority for Consumers and Markets (ACM: Autoriteit Consument & Markt) and the Dutch Authority for Digital Infrastructure (RDI: Rijksdienst Digitale Infrastructuur).

Rank	Operator	Technology	Subscribers (in millions)	Ownership	MCC / MNC
1	Odido (formerly T-Mobile, Ben) • Includes the previous Tele2 and Orange (Dutchtone) networks.	900/2100* MHz UMTS, HSDPA, HSUPA, HSPA+** *Only active on sites without low-band antennas. **3G to be discontinued from 1 August 2026; 800/900/1500/1800/2100/2600 MHz LTE, LTE-A; 2600 MHz TD-LTE; VoLTE, VoWiFi, AML; 700/2100/3500 MHz 5G NR ***detailed information on sites and frequencies to be found on the antennekaart website	7.3 (Q4 2024)	WP/AP Telecom Holdings IV B.V. (Warburg Pincus 50%, Apax Partners 50%)	20416 and 20402
2	KPN • Includes the previous Telfort (O_{2} Netherlands) network.	900* MHz GSM (GPRS, EDGE); *2G to be discontinued as of 1 December 2027; 800/900/1500/1800/2600 MHz LTE, LTE-A; 2600 MHz TD-LTE; VoLTE, VoWiFi, AML; 700/2100/3500 MHz 5G NR; 450 MHz CDMA (Smart meters only) **detailed information on sites and frequencies to be found on the antennekaart website	6.1 (Q2 2025)	Koninklijke KPN	20408
3	Vodafone (formerly Libertel)	900/1800* MHz GSM (GPRS, EDGE); *Only active on sites without low-band antennas. 800/1500/1800/2100/2600 MHz LTE, LTE-A; VoLTE, VoWiFi, AML; 700/1800**/3500 MHz 5G NR **using Dynamic Spectrum Sharing (DSS) ***detailed information on sites and frequencies to be found on the antennekaart website	5.605 (Q3 2025)	Ziggo Group (Liberty Global (90%) and Vodafone Group (10%))	20404

== North Macedonia ==
North Macedonia has 1.992 million subscribers in total, or a 95% penetration rate (Q4 2025).

The regulatory authority for telecommunication in North Macedonia is AEC.

Rank	Operator	Technology	Subscribers (in millions)	Ownership	MCC / MNC
1	Telekom (formerly T-Mobile, MOBIMAK)	GSM-900 MHz (GPRS, EDGE); 2100 MHz UMTS, HSDPA; 800/1800 MHz LTE, LTE-A, VoLTE, 700/3600 MHz 5G NR	0.923 (Q4 2025)	Magyar Telekom (51%) (Deutsche Telekom AG 69%)	29401
2	A1 (formerly one, Vip, Cosmofon)	GSM-900/1800 MHz (GPRS, EDGE); 900/2100 MHz UMTS, HSPA+ 800/1800 MHz LTE, LTE-A, VoLTE, 700/3600 MHz 5G NR	0.936 (Q4 2025)	A1 Group	29403

== Norway ==
Norway has 5.730 million subscribers in total, or a 108.97% penetration rate (December 2016).

The regulatory authority for telecommunication in Norway is the Norwegian Post and Telecommunications Authority.

Rank	Operator	Technology	Subscribers (in millions)	Ownership	MCC / MNC
1	Telenor	GSM-900/1800 MHz (GPRS, EDGE) (2G to be discontinued in 2027); 3G discontinued in January 2021; 800/900/1800/2100/2600 MHz LTE, LTE-A; VoLTE, VoWiFi; 700/3500 MHz 5G NR	▼2.544 (Q4 2025)	Telenor (Government of Norway (53,97%))	24201
2	Telia (formerly NetCom) • Includes the previous Tele2 network.	2G discontinued in December 2025; 3G discontinued in November 2021; 800/900/1800/2100/2600 MHz LTE, LTE-A; VoLTE, VoWiFi; 700/3500 MHz 5G NR	▼1.846 (Q4 2025)	Telia Company	24202
3	Ice (formerly Ice.net)	2G discontinued in May 2025; 700/800/900/1800/2100 MHz LTE (Roams on Telenor network in areas without its own coverage); VoLTE, VoWiFi; 700/2100/3500 MHz 5G NR	▲1.049 (Q4 2025)	Lyse AS	24214, 24206

== Poland ==
Poland has 67.2 million subscribers in total (Q4 2025).

The country's telecom regulator is UKE (Urząd Komunikacji Elektronicznej).

Rank	Operator	Technology	Subscribers (in millions)	Ownership	MCC / MNC
1	Orange (formerly Idea)	GSM 900 MHz (GPRS, EDGE); 700/800/900/1800/2100/2600 MHz LTE, LTE-A; 700/2100/3600 MHz 5G NR; VoLTE, ViLTE, VoWiFi (shares network with T-Mobile)	20.996 (Q3 2026) 14.772 (excluding M2M)	Orange S.A. (50.67%), free float (49.33%)	26003
2	Play	E-GSM/GSM 900/1800 MHz (GPRS, EDGE); 700/800/900/1800/2100/2600 MHz LTE, LTE-A; 700/2100/3500 MHz 5G NR; VoLTE, ViLTE, VoWiFi	13.671 (Q3 2026)	Iliad SA	26006
3	T-Mobile (formerly Era)	GSM 900 MHz (GPRS, EDGE); 800/900/1800/2100/2600 MHz LTE, LTE-A; 700/2100/3700 MHz 5G NR; VoLTE, VoWiFi (shares network with Orange)	13.517 (Q3 2026)	Deutsche Telekom AG	26002
4	Plus (formerly Plus GSM)	GSM 900/1800 MHz (GPRS, EDGE) UMTS 900/2100 MHz (HSPA+); 420/900/1800/2100/2600/2600TDD MHz LTE, LTE-A; 700/2100/2600/3400 MHz 5G NR; VoLTE, VoWiFi	8.749 (Q3 2026)	Grupa Polsat Plus	26001

== Portugal ==
Portugal has 17.6 million subscribers in total, or a 170.5% penetration rate (13.1 million active subscribers or 127.4% penetration rate) (Q3 2017).

The country's telecom regulator is ANACOM. Following the commercial launch of DIGI in late 2024, the market has seen a significant shift in subscriber distribution.

Rank	Operator	Technology	Subscribers (in millions)	Ownership	MCC / MNC
1	NOS	GSM-900/1800 (GPRS, EDGE); 2100 MHz UMTS, HSPA+ 800/1800/2100/2600 MHz LTE; 700/3500 MHz 5G NR (5G SA)	6.118 (Q3 2024)	NOS	26803
2	MEO	GSM-900 (GPRS, EDGE); 2100 MHz UMTS, HSPA+, DC-HSPA+ 800/1800/2100/2600 MHz LTE, LTE-A; 700/3600 MHz 5G NR	5.698 (Q2 2024)	Altice Portugal	26806
3	Vodafone	GSM-900 (GPRS, EDGE); 900 MHz UMTS, HSPA+ 800/900/1800/2100/2600 MHz LTE, LTE-A; VoLTE; 700/3500 MHz 5G NR	4.530 (Q1 2027)	Vodafone Group plc	26801
4	DIGI	GSM-900 (Roaming); 1800/2100 MHz LTE; 2600/3500 MHz 5G NR	0.789 (Q2 2025)	Digi Communications N.V.	26802

== Romania ==
Romania has 22.8 million active subscribers in total, or a 120% penetration rate (2025). The country's telecom regulator is ANCOM. Following the acquisition of Telekom Romania Mobile by Vodafone and Digi in October 2025, the market has consolidated into three main players.

Rank	Operator	Technology	Subscribers (in millions)	Ownership	MCC / MNC
1	Orange	GSM-900/1800 (GPRS, EDGE); 700(B28)/800(B20)/900(B8)/1500(B32) 1800(B3)/2100(B1)/2600(B7) MHz LTE, LTE-A, VoLTE, VoWiFi; 2100/3500 MHz 5G	9.0 (Q2 2026)	Orange S.A.	22610
2	Digi	GSM-900 (no GPRS, no EDGE); 800(B20)/900(B8)/2100(B1)/2600 FDD(B7) 2600 TDD(B38) LTE, LTE-A, VoLTE, VoWiFi; 2600FDD/ 2600TDD/3500 MHz 5G	8.75 (Q3 2026)	Digi Communications N.V.	22605
3	Vodafone	GSM-900/1800 (GPRS, EDGE); 700(B28)/800(B20)/900(B8)/1800(B3) 2100(B1) MHz LTE, LTE-A, VoLTE, ViLTE, VoWiFi; 2100/3500 MHz 5G	7.5 (Q1 2027)	Vodafone Group plc	22601
4	Telekom Romania	GSM-900/1800 (GPRS, EDGE); 700(B28)/800(B20)/900(B8)/1800(B3) 2100(B1) MHz LTE, LTE-A, VoLTE, ViLTE, VoWiFi; 2100/3500 MHz 5G	3.6 (Q2 2024)	Vodafone Group plc / DIGI	22603

== Russia ==
The country's telecom regulator is Roskomnadzor (RKN).

Rank	Operator	Technology	Subscribers (in millions)	Ownership	Mobile country code
Big four mobile network operators
1	MTS	GSM-900/1800 MHz (GPRS, EDGE); 900/2100 MHz UMTS, HSDPA, HSUPA, HSPA+ 800/900/1800/2100/2600 MHz LTE, VoLTE; 800/900/1800 MHz NB-IoT; 2100/2600/4900 MHz 5G NR	83.4 (Q4 2025)	PJSC Sistema (42.09%), PJSC MTS (5.69%), free float (52.22%)	25001
2	MegaFon (formerly North-West GSM)	GSM-900/1800 MHz (GPRS, EDGE); 900/2100 MHz UMTS, HSDPA, HSUPA, HSPA+ 800/1800/2500/2600 MHz LTE, LTE-A, VoLTE; 1800/2100/2600 MHz 5G NR	79.37 (Q4 2025)	USM Holdings	25002
3	t2 (formerly Tele2)	GSM-900/1800 MHz (GPRS, EDGE); 2100 MHz UMTS, HSDPA, HSUPA, HSPA+ 450/800/900/1800/2100/2300/2600 MHz LTE; 4900 MHz 5G NR	48.9 (Q4 2025)	PJSC Rostelecom	25020
4	beeline	GSM-900/1800 MHz (GPRS, EDGE); 900/2100 MHz UMTS, HSDPA, HSUPA, HSPA+, DC-HSPA+ 800/1800/2100/2600 MHz LTE, LTE-A, VoLTE	44.1 (Q3 2023)	PJSC VimpelCom	25099
Regional mobile network operators
5	K-Telecom; Coverage: Crimea, Sevastopol, Luhansk, Donetsk, Zaporozhye, Kherson	GSM-900/1800 MHz; 2100 MHz UMTS; 2600 MHz LTE	3.0 (2025)	OOO K-Telecom	25032, 25096
6	MOTIV; Coverage: Sverdlovsk, Kurgan, Khanty-Mansi, Yamalo-Nenets	GSM-1800 MHz; 1800/2500 MHz LTE, VoLTE	2.5 (2025)	OOO EKATERINBURG-2000	25035
7	Miranda; Coverage: Crimea, Sevastopol, Luhansk, Donetsk, Zaporozhye, Kherson	GSM-900 MHz; 2100 MHz UMTS; 450 MHz LTE	2.1 (2025)	OOO Miranda-Media	25054
8	Letai (formerly Tattelecom); Coverage: Tatarstan	GSM-1800 MHz; 1800 MHz LTE	2.0 (2025)	PJSC Tattelecom	25027
9	Phoenix; Coverage: Donetsk	GSM-900/1800 MHz; 2100 MHz UMTS; 800/900/1800/2600 MHz LTE	1.5 (2023)	SUE DPR "ROS"	25097
10	MKS; Coverage: Luhansk	GSM-900/1800 MHz; 2100 MHz UMTS; 900/1800/2600 MHz LTE	1.0 (2022)	OOO MKS	25098
11	Vainah Telecom; Coverage: Chechnya	GSM-900/1800 MHz; 2300 MHz LTE	0.1 (2020)	JSC Vainah Telecom	25008

== San Marino ==
San Marino has 0.037 million subscribers in total, or a 116.95% penetration rate (December 2013).

Rank	Operator	Technology	Subscribers (in millions)	Ownership	MCC / MNC
1	TIM San Marino	GSM-900/1800 (GPRS, EDGE); 900/2100 MHz UMTS, HSDPA, HSUPA, HSPA+, DC-HSPA+ 800/1800/2600 MHz LTE, LTE-A		TIM	22201

== Serbia ==
Serbia has 7.91 million subscribers, or a 121.69% penetration rate (June 2026).

The regulatory authority for telecommunication in Serbia is RATEL.

Rank	Operator	Technology	Market share (in %)	Ownership	MCC / MNC
1	MTS	900 MHz - GSM; 800/1800/2100/2600 MHz - LTE; 700/3500 MHz - 5G NR; VoLTE, ViLTE, eSIM, Multi-SIM	42% (Q2 2026)	Telekom Srbija	22003
2	Yettel	900 MHz - GSM; 900 MHz - 3G; 700/800/1800/2100/2600 MHz - LTE; 700/3500 MHz - 5G NR; VoLTE, ViLTE, eSIM, Multi-SIM	32% (Q2 2026)	e& PPF Telecom Group	22001
3	A1	900 MHz - GSM; 800/1800/2100/2600 MHz - LTE; 700/3500 MHz - 5G NR; VoLTE, ViLTE, eSIM, Multi-SIM	26% (Q2 2026)	A1 Group	22005

== Slovakia ==
Slovakia has 7.68 million subscribers in total, or a 132.79% penetration rate. All facts are based on the three-month customer activity base (October 2019).

The regulatory authority for electronic communications "telecommunication" in Slovakia is Úrad pre reguláciu elektronických komunikácií a poštových služieb (RÚ).

Rank	Operator	Technology	Subscribers (in millions)	Ownership	MCC / MNC
1	O_{2} (formerly Telefónica, O2 Telefónica)	900 MHz GSM (GPRS, EDGE) (Roaming on Telekom Slovakia (2G) when needed); 900 MHz UMTS, HSDPA, HSPA+ 700/800/1800/2100 MHz LTE, LTE-A; 1800/2100/3600 MHz 5G NR VoLTE, VoWiFi, RCS	2.408 (Q2 2026)	e& PPF Telecom Group	23106
2	Orange (formerly Globtel, Slovtel)	900 MHz GSM (GPRS, EDGE); 700/800/900/1800/2100/2600 MHz LTE, LTE-A, LTE-A Pro (Allows 4ka to access 900 and 2100 MHz)700/2100/3600 MHz 5G NR; VoLTE, VoWiFi, RCS	2.376 (Q3 2026)	Orange S.A.	23101, 23105
3	Telekom (formerly Eurotel, T-Mobile)	900 MHz GSM (GPRS, EDGE); 700/800/1800/2100/2600 MHz LTE, LTE-A, LTE-A Pro; 2600 MHz TD-LTE; 700/2100/3600 MHz 5G NR (3600 MHz only in Bratislava)VoLTE, VoWiFi, RCS	2.361 (Q2 2026)	Deutsche Telekom AG	23102, 23104
4	4ka (SWAN)	1800 MHz GSM (GPRS, EDGE) (Roaming on Orange Slovakia (2G, 4G (900, 2100 MHz) when out of native coverage); 1800 MHz LTE, LTE-A Pro; VoLTE, ViLTE, VoWiFi, RCS; 3600 MHz 5G NR	0.670 (Q2 2025)	SWAN	23103

== Slovenia ==
Slovenia has 2,842,312 subscribers in total, or a 133% penetration rate (Q2 2026).

Rank	Operator	Technology	Subscribers (in millions)	Ownership	MCC / MNC
1	Telekom Slovenije (formerly Mobitel)	GSM 900/1800 (GPRS, EDGE); 700/800/900/1800/2100/2600 MHz LTE, LTE-A; VoLTE, VoWiFi; 700/2600/3600 MHz 5G NR/5G SA	1.056 (Q2 2026); Including Mega M, Novatel MOBIL, SoftNet mobil	Telekom Slovenije	29341
2	A1 (formerly Si.mobil)	GSM 900/1800 (GPRS, EDGE); 800/1500/1800/2100/2600 MHz LTE, LTE-A; VoLTE, VoWiFi; 700/3500 MHz 5G NR	0.873 (Q2 2026); Including bob, Hotmobil	A1 Group	29340
3	Telemach (formerly Tušmobil)	GSM 900/1800 (GPRS, EDGE); 900 MHz UMTS, HSPA, HSPA+ 700/800/1800/2100/2300 MHz LTE, LTE-A; VoLTE; 700/3600 MHz 5G NR	0.713 (Q2 2026)	United Group	29370
4	T-2	2100 MHz UMTS, HSPA (Roaming on A1 (2G/LTE/5G, VoLTE) network when needed); 2100 MHz LTE; 2300 MHz 5G NR	0.198 (Q2 2026)	Garnol (pending sale to Telemach)	29364

== Spain ==
Spain has 63.009 million subscribers in total, or a 128.40% penetration rate (Dic 2025).

The regulatory authority for telecommunication in Spain is CNMC (Comisión Nacional de los Mercados y la Competencia).

Note: The number of subscribers of each operator includes the subscribers of the main brand and the rest of its brands and subsidiaries.

Rank	Operator	Technology	Subscribers (in millions)	Ownership	MCC / MNC
1	Orange (formerly Amena) •Includes the previous Yoigo network.	900/1800 MHz GSM, GPRS, EDGE; 900/2100 MHz UMTS, HSPA, HSPA+ 700/800/1800/2100/2600 MHz LTE, LTE-A; 700/2100/3500 MHz 5G NR; VoLTE, VoWiFi, VoNR	25.984 (Dic 2025)	Orange S.A.	21403; 21404
2	Movistar (formerly MoviLine)	900/1800 MHz GSM, GPRS, EDGE; 900/2100 MHz UMTS, HSPA, HSPA+ 700/800/900/1800/2100/2600 MHz LTE, LTE-A; 700/2100/3500 MHz 5G NR; VoLTE, VoWiFi, VoNR, ViLTE	16.437 (May 2026)	Telefónica S.A.	21407
3	Vodafone (formerly Airtel)	900/1800 MHz GSM, GPRS, EDGE; 900/2100 MHz UMTS, HSPA, HSPA+ 700/800/900/1800/2100/2600 MHz LTE, LTE-A; 700/3500 MHz 5G NR; VoLTE, VoWiFi	11.655 (Dic 2025)	Zegona Communications Plc.	21401
4	DIGI	1800/2100 MHz LTE, LTE-A; 3500 MHz 5G NR (RAN sharing & roaming with Movistar where there is no coverage); VoLTE, VoWiFi	7.38 (Dic 2025)	Digi Communications N.V.	21422

== Sweden ==
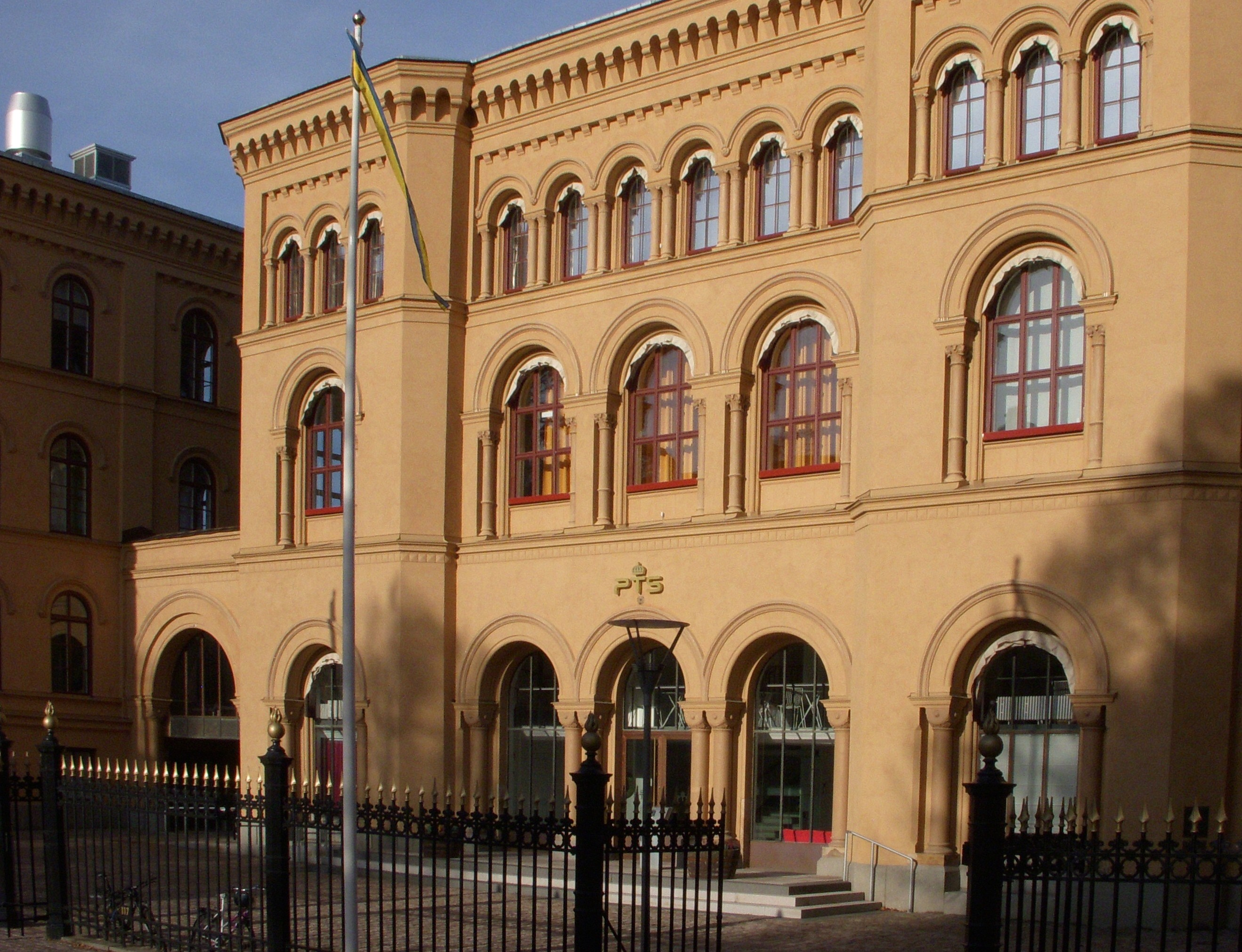
Headquarters of Swedish Post and Telecom Authority

Sweden has 14.3 million subscribers in total, approximately 140% penetration rate (2020). The country's telcom regulator is Swedish Post and Telecom Authority.

There are four main network operators, and they share various 2G, 3G, 4G and 5G network infrastructure through co-ownership in separate network companies. Tele2 and Telenor share network infrastructure through their company Net4Mobility. Telia and Tele2 share network infrastructure through UMTS Nät AB. Tre and Telenor share network infrastructure through 3GIS.

Sweden also has a number of flanker brands and virtual operators, most notable are Halebop, Comviq, Fello, Hallon, Vimla, Mybeat, Tellusmobil and Chilimobil.

Some of world's largest producers of mobile network equipment have strong ties to Sweden. Ericsson is based in Sweden while Nokia, Siemens, Huawei and ZTE have major research centers in the country, often clustered around Kista and Lund.

Rank	Operator	Technology	Subscribers (in millions)	Ownership	MCC / MNC
1	Telia	GSM-900/1800 MHz (GPRS, EDGE); 900/2100 MHz UMTS, HSDPA; 800/1800/2600 MHz LTE, LTE-A 700/3500 MHz 5G NR	▲3.876 (Q4 2025)	Telia Company (Government of Sweden (41,1%))	24001
2	Telenor (formerly Vodafone)	GSM-900/1800 MHz (GPRS, EDGE); 2100 MHz UMTS, HSDPA; 800/900/1800/2600 MHz LTE, LTE-A; 3500 MHz 5G NR	▲3.088 (Q4 2025)	Telenor	24008
3	Tele2	GSM-900/1800 MHz (GPRS, EDGE); 2100 MHz UMTS, HSDPA; 800/900/1800/2600 MHz LTE, LTE-A 3500 MHz 5G NR	▲2.195 (Q4 2025)	Tele2 AB (Freya Investissement (Iliad/NJJ) 22,10%)	24007
4	Tre	900/2100 MHz UMTS, HSDPA; 800/2100/2600 MHz FD-LTE, 2600 MHz TD-LTE, LTE-A 2100/2600/3500 MHz 5G NR; VoLTE, VoWiFi	▼1.940 (Q4 2024)	CK Hutchison Holdings (60%), Investor AB (40%)	24002

== Switzerland ==
Switzerland has 11.365 million mobile subscribers and a 138% penetration rate (December 2014).

The country's telecom regulator is BAKOM.

Rank	Operator	Technology	Postpaid Subscribers (in millions)	Ownership	MCC / MNC
1	Swisscom	700/800/900/1500 (FDD SDL)/1800/2600 MHz LTE, LTE-A; VoLTE, VoWiFi, VoNR; 700/2100/3500 MHz 5G NR	5.556 (Q3 2025)	Partially state-owned (50% plus one share), free float (49%)	22801
2	Sunrise (formerly diAx)	900/2100 MHz UMTS, HSDPA, HSPA+, DC-HSPA+ 800/900/1800/2100/2600 MHz LTE, LTE-A; VoLTE; 900/3500 MHz 5G NR	2.806 (Q4 2024)	Free float	22802
3	Salt (formerly Orange CH)	900/2100 MHz UMTS, HSPA, HSPA+, DC-HSPA+ 800/1800/2100/2600 MHz LTE, LTE-A; VoLTE, VoWiFi; 3500 MHz 5G NR	1.800 (Q3 2025)	NJJ	22803

== Turkey ==
Turkey has 94.5 million subscribers in total, or a 110.7% penetration rate (Q1 2025).

The telecom regulator in Turkey is Information and Communication Technologies Authority (Turkish: BTK: Bilgi Teknolojileri ve İletişim Kurumu).

Rank	Operator	Technology	Subscribers (in millions)	Ownership
1	Turkcell	GSM 900 MHz (GPRS, EDGE); 900/2100 MHz UMTS, HSDPA, HSUPA, HSPA, HSPA+, DC-HSPA+, 3C-HSDPA; 800/900/1800/2100/2600 MHz LTE, LTE-A, LTE-A Pro; VoLTE, VoWiFi, eSIM; 400/700 Mhz FDD, 3500 GHz TDD, 26 GHz 5G NR	38.3 (Q1 2025)	Turkey Wealth Fund (26.2%), LetterOne (19.8%), free float (54%)
2	Türk Telekom (formerly Avea, Aria, Aycell)	GSM 900 (only in rural areas)/1800 MHz (GPRS, EDGE); 900/2100 MHz UMTS, HSDPA, HSUPA, HSPA, HSPA+, DC-HSPA+ 800/900/1800/2100/2600 MHz LTE, LTE-A, LTE-A Pro; VoLTE, VoWiFi, eSIM; 400/700 Mhz FDD, 3500 GHz TDD, 26 GHz 5G NR	27.9 (Q1 2025)	Türk Telekom (Turkey Wealth Fund (60%), Ministry of Treasury and Finance (Turkey) (25%), free float (15%))
3	Vodafone Turkey (formerly Telsim)	GSM 900 MHz (GPRS, EDGE); 2100 MHz UMTS, HSDPA, HSUPA, HSPA, HSPA+, DC-HSPA+ 800/900/1800/2100/2600 MHz LTE, LTE-A, LTE-A Pro; VoLTE, VoWiFi, eSIM; 400/700 Mhz FDD, 3500 GHz TDD, 26 GHz 5G NR	25.351 (Q1 2027)	Vodafone Group plc

== Ukraine ==
The country's telecom regulator is NKRZI (National commission for the state regulation of: electronic communications; RF spectrum; the provision of postal services, Ukrainian: НКРЗІ, Національна комісія, що здійснює державне регулювання у сферах електронних комунікацій, радіочастотного спектра та надання послуг поштового зв`язку).

Due to the Russo-Ukrainian war, roaming on other operator's networks is free and includes voice calls, SMS and mobile 2G / 3G Internet at speeds up to 512 kbit/s.

Rank	Operator	Technology	Subscribers (in millions)	Ownership	MCC / MNC
1	Kyivstar (Including previous Beeline Ukraine network)	900/1800 MHz GSM (GPRS, EDGE); 2100 MHz UMTS, HSDPA, HSUPA, HSPA, HSPA+, DC-HSPA+ 900/1800/2100/2300/2600 MHz LTE, LTE-A, VoLTE	23.4 (Q2 2024)	VEON (LetterOne (45.5%), The Stichting (7.9%), Lingotto Investment Management LLP (8.2%), Shah Capital Management Inc. (6.6%), free float 31.8%)	25503
2	Vodafone (formerly MTS Ukraine, UMC)	900/1800 MHz GSM (GPRS, EDGE); 2100 MHz UMTS, HSDPA, HSUPA, HSPA, HSPA+, DC-HSPA+ 900/1800/2100/2600 MHz LTE, LTE-A	15.9 (Q2 2024)	NEQSOL Holding	25501
3	lifecell (formerly life:)	900/1800 MHz GSM (GPRS, EDGE); 900/2100 MHz UMTS, HSDPA, HSUPA, HSPA, HSPA+, DC-HSPA+, 3C-HSDPA; 900/1800/2100/2600 MHz LTE, LTE-A, LTE-A Pro, VoLTE, VoWi-Fi	9.8 (Q2 2024)	DVL Telecom (NJJ 85%)	25506
3	3 Mob	900/1800 MHz GSM (GPRS, EDGE); 900/2100 MHz UMTS, HSDPA, HSUPA, HSPA, HSPA+, DC-HSPA+, 3C-HSDPA; 900/1800/2100/2600 MHz LTE, LTE-A, LTE-A Pro, VoLTE, VoWi-Fi	0.955 (Q3 2020)	Ukrtelecom	25507

== United Kingdom ==
The United Kingdom has over 95 million mobile connections in total (2026).

The country's telecom regulator is Ofcom. Following the merger of Vodafone UK and Three UK in May 2025, the market is led by the joint venture VodafoneThree. CK Hutchison Holdings agreed in May 2026 to sell its whole stake in the business to Vodafone Group, subject to regulatory approval. The transaction was approved, and subsequently completed on 30 July 2026, with VodafoneThree now a wholly owned subsidiary of Vodafone Group.

Rank	Operator	Technology	Subscribers (in millions)	Ownership	MCC / MNC
1	Vodafone	900 MHz GSM (GPRS, EDGE); 800/900/1500/1800/2100/2600 MHz LTE, LTE-A; 2600 MHz TD-LTE; 900/2100/3500 MHz 5G NR; VoLTE, VoWiFi, AML	27.9 (Q2 2027) (Includes VOXI, SMARTY & Talkmobile)	VodafoneThree (Vodafone Group plc)	23415
1	Three	700/800/1800/1500/2100 MHz LTE, 700/2100/3500 MHz 5G NR; VoLTE, VoWiFi, AML, RCS	27.9 (Q2 2027) (Includes VOXI, SMARTY & Talkmobile)	VodafoneThree (Vodafone Group plc)	23420
2	O2	900 MHz GSM (GPRS, EDGE); 700/800/900/1800/2100 MHz LTE, LTE-A; 2300/2600 MHz TD-LTE; 700/900/2100/3500 MHz 5G NR; VoLTE, VoWiFi, AML, RCS	22.0 (Q1 2026) (Includes giffgaff)	Virgin Media O2 (Telefónica (50%), Liberty Global (50%))	23410
3	EE	1800 MHz GSM (GPRS, EDGE); 700/800/1800/2100/2600/5200 MHz LTE, LTE-A; 700/1800/2100/2600/3500 MHz 5G NR; VoLTE, VoWiFi, AML, RCS	21.6 (Q2 2027)	BT Group	23430

== See also ==
- List of mobile network operators
- List of mobile network operators of the Americas
- List of mobile network operators in Asia and Oceania
- List of mobile network operators in the Middle East and Africa
- List of telecommunications regulatory bodies
- Mobile network codes in ITU region 2xx (Europe)
