= Telephone numbers in Russia =

- Zones of ABC codes by federal subjects
- Country: Russia
- Continent: Europe
- Regulator: Roskomnadzor, Ministry of Digital Development, Communications and Mass Media
- Numbering plan type: Closed
- NSN length: 10
- Format: (ABC) xxx-xx-xx
- Numbering plan: Russian Federation
- Last updated: 2024
- Country code: 7
- International access: 8~10
- Long-distance: 8

Telephone numbers in Russia are administered by Roskomnadzor, and the Ministry of Digital Development, Communications and Mass Media of the Russian Federation. Russia's national telephone numbering plan comprises four levels of destination routing codes with local, zone, country, and international scopes, implementing a closed numbering plan, in which the number of digits of all national significant numbers assigned to subscriber telephones is fixed at ten, with three digits for the area code, and a seven-digit subscriber number which includes a zone code of up to two digits.

Russia is a member of the International Telecommunication Union (ITU) and participates in the international numbering plan provided by recommendations E.164 and E.123, using the telephone country code 7, which is shared with Kazakhstan, designating two area codes for routing calls to that country. Country code 7 was originally assigned to the Soviet Union, and continued to be used by the fifteen successor states after the 1991 dissolution of the Soviet Union. All but two successor states switched to new, individual country codes from the 3xx and 9xx ranges between 1993 and 1998.

== Dialing pattern ==
=== Calls within Russia ===
8 ABC xxx-xx-xx (where ABC is the area code)

- e.g. 8 499 xxx-xx-xx (to Moscow, fixed line)
- e.g. 8 812 234-56-78 (to St. Petersburg, fixed line)
- e.g. 8 985 xxx-xx-xx (to a mobile number issued by MTS in Moscow)

=== International calls from Russia ===
Pre-Selected Operator: 8-tone-10 International number or +

- e.g. 8-10 44 20 7946-0123 (to London/UK) or +44 20 7946-0123
- e.g. +7 727 xxx-xx-xx (to Almaty/Kazakhstan)

=== International calls to Russia ===
- +7 ABC xxx-xx-xx (where ABC is the area code)

== Area codes ==
First digit of code	Routed to
0	Used for numbers in Kazakhstan
1	Not used
2	Reserved
3	Geographic codes in Russia
4	Geographic codes in Russia
5	Reserved
6	Used for numbers in Kazakhstan
7	Used for numbers in Kazakhstan
8	Geographic codes, Toll-Free, and Pay-Line (shared between Russia, Kazakhstan, Abkhazia, and South Ossetia)
9	Russian mobiles (code 940 and 929 is for Abkhazia and South Ossetia mobiles)

=== Geographic area codes ===
The dialing code range 4xx was introduced on 1 December 2005 to replace 0xx, in order to make it possible to adopt the ITU recommendation of 0 and 00 dialing prefixes for local and international dialing respectively. The old '095' dialing code, along with 19 other Russian area codes starting with '0', expired on 31 January 2006.

Russian federal subjects	Area code	Old code (inactive)	Remarks
Republic of Adygea	877		
Altai Krai	385		
Altai Republic	388		
Amur Oblast	416		
Arkhangelsk Oblast and Nenets Autonomous Okrug	818		
Astrakhan Oblast	851		
Republic of Bashkortostan	347		
Belgorod Oblast	472	072	
Bryansk Oblast	483	083	
Republic of Buryatia	301		
Vladimir Oblast	492	092	
Volgograd Oblast	844		
Vologda Oblast	817, 820		
Voronezh Oblast	473	073	
Republic of Dagestan	872		
Jewish Autonomous Oblast	426		
Sverdlovsk Oblast	343		
Ivanovo Oblast	493	093	
Republic of Ingushetia	873		
Irkutsk Oblast	395		
Republic of Kabardino-Balkaria	866		
Kaliningrad Oblast	401	011	
Republic of Kalmykia	847		
Kaluga Oblast	484	084	
Kamchatka Krai	415		
Republic of Karachay–Cherkessia	878		
Republic of Karelia	814		
Kemerovo Oblast	384		
Kirov Oblast	833		
Komi Republic	821		
Kostroma Oblast	494	094	
Krasnodar Krai	861, 862		
Krasnoyarsk Krai	391		
Kurgan Oblast	352		
Kursk Oblast	471	071	
Leningrad Oblast	813		
Lipetsk Oblast	474	074	
Magadan Oblast	413		
Republic of Mari El	836		
Republic of Mordovia	834		
Moscow City	495, 499	095	
Moscow Oblast	496, 498	096	
Murmansk Oblast	815		
Nizhny Novgorod Oblast	831		
Novgorod Oblast	816		
Novosibirsk Oblast	383		
Omsk Oblast	381		
Orenburg Oblast	353		
Oryol Oblast	486	086	
Penza Oblast	841		
Perm Krai	342		
Primorsky Krai	423		
Pskov Oblast	811		
Rostov Oblast	863		
Ryazan Oblast	491	091	
Samara Oblast	846, 848		
Saint Petersburg	812		
Saratov Oblast	845		
Sakhalin Oblast	424		
Republic of North Ossetia–Alania	867		
Smolensk Oblast	481	081	
Stavropol Krai	865, 879		
Tambov Oblast	475	075	
Republic of Tatarstan	843, 855		
Tver Oblast	482	082	
Tomsk Oblast	382		
Tula Oblast	487	087	
Republic of Tyva (Tuva)	394		
Tyumen Oblast	345		
Republic of Udmurtia	341		
Ulyanovsk Oblast	842		
Khabarovsk Krai	421		
Republic of Khakassia	390		
Khanty–Mansi Autonomous Okrug	346		
Chelyabinsk Oblast	351		
Republic of Chechnya	871		
Zabaykalsky Krai	302		
Republic of Chuvashia	835		
Chukotka Autonomous Okrug	427		
Sakha Republic (Yakutia)	411		
Yamalo-Nenets Autonomous Okrug	349		
Yaroslavl Oblast	485	085	

=== Russian mobile phones, toll-free, and pay-line codes ===
Code	Service
800	FPH: Freephone
862	FPH: Fixed
801	AAB: Automatic alternative billing
802	CCC: Credit card calling
803	VOT: Televoting
804	UAN: Universal access number
805	PCC: Prepaid card calling
806	ACC: Account card calling
807	VPN: Virtual private network
808	UPT: Universal personal Telecommunication
809	PRM: Premium rate
881–899	Reserved
900–953; 955–969; 972–999	Russian mobile networks - MTS, MegaFon, t2, Beeline
954	Satellite operators
970	Telematic services
971	Data transfer services

=== Special numbers (emergencies) ===
Number	Service	Old (active)
101	Fire brigade	01
102	Police	02
103	Ambulance	03
104	Gas service	04
112	General emergency	
107	Directory assistance, Rostelecom	07
109	Directory assistance (free, limited info)	09
009	Directory assistance (pay service, 35 rubles/min.) in Moscow	
100	Talking clock in Moscow	
115	Information on electronic government services	

In a press conference in December 2013 Minister of Emergency Situations, Vladimir Puchkov said that the unified system runs in a full pilot mode from 2014 and will fully enter to operational mode in 2016.

=== Codes assigned to annexed Ukrainian territories ===
In 2014, following the Russian annexation of Crimea, Republic of Crimea and Sevastopol were integrated into the Russian numbering plan.

On 7 May 2022, following the annexation of Donetsk, Kherson, Lugansk and Zaporozhye oblasts, the four oblasts were integrated into the Russian numbering plan.

Area	Russian codes	Ukrainian codes for country code 380
Republic of Crimea	365	65
Donetsk People's Republic	856	62
Kherson Oblast	860	65
Luhansk People's Republic	857	64
Sevastopol	8692	692
Zaporozhye Oblast	810	61

=== Codes assigned to Abkhazia ===
Telephone numbers in Abkhazia use two area codes – 840 and 940 – in the Russian dialing plan. Until 1992, Abkhazia had a single telephone numbering system with Russia. In April 1996, the Ministry of Communications of the Russian Federation limited international telephone communications in Abkhazia, retaining only 16 outgoing and 24 incoming telephone channels of the 151 incoming and 182 outgoing channels that operated previously. On 15 February 1997, an agreement was signed between Russia and Georgia, which provided for a change in the communication scheme of Abkhazia with the outside world and switching channels to Georgia. The agreement met with resentment in Abkhazia, whose leadership accused Georgia and Russia of violating an earlier agreement that provided for the restoration of the communications that existed before 1992.

On 28 September 2009, after Russia recognised Abkhazia's independence, Russia and Abkhazia signed a Memorandum of Cooperation through which Abkhazia was given a telephone code from numbering zone 7 and switched to the Russian numbering plan on 1 January 2010. Abkhazian numbers can be accessed from abroad through country code 7 assigned by the International Telecommunication Union to Russia. Until 2009, they could also be accessed via the Georgian country code +995.

Area	Old Georgian codes (1996–2009)	New Russian codes (since 2009)
Sukhumi	995 442	840 22X XXXX
Gudauta	995 444	840 24X XXXX
Ochamchire	995 445	840 25X XXXX
Tkvarcheli	995 446	840 26X XXXX
Gali	995 447	840 27X XXXX
Gulripshi	995 448	840 28X XXXX
Mobile operator - A-Mobile	n.d.	940 7XX XXXX
Mobile operator - Aquafon	995 544	940 9XX XXXX

=== Codes assigned to South Ossetia ===
Telephone numbers in South Ossetia use two area codes – 850 and 929 – in the Russia numbering plan zone.

Format	Application	Georgian codes
+7 850 XXX XXXX	Fixed telephony	+995 342 XXX XXX Akhalgori, +995 344 XXX XXX Tskhinvali, +995 347 XXX XXX Java
+7 929 8XX XXXX	Mobile telephony	

== See also ==
- Telecommunications in Russia
