= Tradeshift =

Global cloud based business platform and network

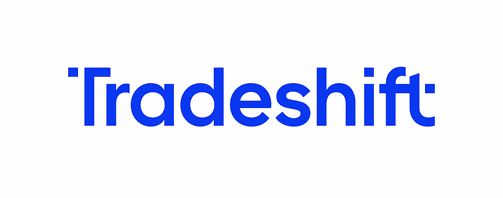
- Industry: Software
- Founded: May 2010
- Founder: Christian Lanng, Mikkel Hippe Brun, Gert Sylvest
- Headquarters: San Francisco
- Number of employees: 300+
- Website: https://tradeshift.com

Tradeshift is a cloud based business network and platform for purchase-to-pay automation, supply chain payments, marketplaces, virtual cards and supply chain financing. Its 2018 round of funding, led by Goldman Sachs, raised US$250 million at a valuation of $1.1 billion, giving the company unicorn status. Tradeshift is headquartered in San Francisco, California and has offices in London, Copenhagen, Bucharest and Kuala Lumpur. Tradeshift has reprocessed over $1 trillion USD through transactions on its network.

== History ==
Tradeshift was founded in 2010 by Christian Lanng, Mikkel Hippe Brun, and Gert Sylvest. Inspiration for Tradeshift came after they created the world's first large scale peer-to-peer infrastructure for an e-business called NemHandel. The founders also had leading roles (Governing board member, Technical Director) in the European Commission project PEPPOL inside the European Union.

In 2010, the Tradeshift platform launched in May in Copenhagen. Tradeshift won the European Startup Awards in the category of "Best Business or Enterprise Startup." In 2011, Tradeshift made its app marketplace available.

In 2012, Tradeshift moved their headquarters from Copenhagen to San Francisco. In 2013, Tradeshift opened an R&D center in Suzhou, China. Tradeshift opened an additional office in London. And LATAM e-invoicing capabilities were added through partnership with Invoiceware.

In 2014, Tradeshift expanded with offices in Tokyo, Paris, and Munich. The EU Commission officially approved the Universal Business Language (UBL) data format – a format Tradeshift supports – as eligible for referencing in tenders from public administrations.

In 2015, Tradeshift won the Circulars "Digital Disruptor" Award at the WEF conference in Davos, Switzerland. Tradeshift also acquired product information management company Merchantry, and launched e-procurement and supplier risk management solutions. In 2016, Tradeshift acquired Hyper Travel and secured a $75 million series-D round funding. In 2017, Tradeshift acquired IBX Business Network and launches Tradeshift Ada.

In 2018, Tradeshift secured a $250 million series-E round funding. and launched Blockchain Payments, the latter as part of Tradeshift Pay. In December 2018 Tradeshift acquired Babelway, an online B2B integration platform. The acquisition added three new office locations to Tradeshift (Salt Lake City, Louvain-la-neuve, Belgium, Cairo Egypt). In Q3 2018, Tradeshift reported year-over-year revenue growth of 400%, new bookings growth of 284%, and gross merchandise volume (GMV) growth of 262%. New total contract value also grew by US$47 million. Additionally, it added 27 new customers including Hertz, Shiseido, ECU and multiple Fortune 500 companies.

In July 2023, HSBC and Tradeshift announced an agreement to launch a new, jointly owned business focused on the development of embedded finance solutions and financial services apps. As part of the agreement, HSBC made a $35 million investment into Tradeshift and joined its board. The agreement was part of a funding round which is expected to raise a minimum of $70 million from HSBC and other investors. The new joint venture will allow HSBC and Tradeshift to deploy a range of digital solutions across Tradeshift and other platforms. This includes payment and fintech services embedded into trade, e-commerce and marketplace experiences.

In September 2023, CEO Lanng was fired for "gross misconduct on multiple grounds," including "allegations of sexual assault and harassment." Tradeshift was alleged to have fired his accuser after she complained to the company's human resources department, its co-founders and members of its board of directors about his abuse.

== Financials ==
The company's valuation as of May 2018 was $1.1 billion. Tradeshift is now considered a unicorn, and, according to Bloomberg, will not need any further funding.

Jan 14, 2020, Tradeshift announced that they had raised $240 million in Series F finance.

== Acquisitions ==
In 2015, Tradeshift acquired product information management company Merchantry. Merchantry is a retail product information management (PIM) software for multi-vendor ecommerce retailers.

In 2016, Tradeshift acquired Hyper Travel. Hyper Travel is a travel management service that allows customers to access travel agents via its native messaging apps, SMS, and email.

In 2017, Tradeshift acquired IBX Group.

In 2018, Tradeshift acquired Babelway, an online B2B integration platform.
