= QCI =

QCI may refer to:

- QoS Class Identifier, a mechanism to ensure proper Quality of Service for bearer traffic in LTE networks
- Quadratic configuration interaction, an extension of configuration interaction in quantum physics
- Queen Charlotte Islands, an archipelago on the North Coast of British Columbia, Canada
- Quality Council of India
