= Video over LTE =

Conversational video service

ViLTE, an acronym for "Video over LTE", is a conversational (i.e. person to person) video service based on the IP Multimedia Subsystem (IMS) core network like VoLTE. It has specific profiles for the control and VoLTE of the video service and uses LTE as the radio access medium. The service as a whole is governed by the GSM Association in PRD IR.94.

== Mechanism ==
ViLTE uses the same control plane protocol as Voice over LTE (VoLTE), namely the Session Initiation Protocol (SIP). The IMS core network along with the applicable Application Server (AS) performs the call control. ViLTE uses the H.264 codec to encode and decode the video stream. The H.264 codec delivers superior quality as compared to the low bit rate 3G-324M codec that is used in 3G conversational video calls.

It is vital that ViLTE video calls are allocated appropriate quality of service (QoS) to differentiate and prioritize this delay and jitter sensitive conversational traffic from other streaming video traffic that is not as delay or jitter sensitive. The mechanism used is called QoS Class Identifier (QCI). The ViLTE bearer traffic is typically allocated QCI=2, and the SIP-based IMS signalling QCI=5.

== Devices ==
As of February 2019 the Global Mobile Suppliers Association had identified 257 devices, virtually all of them phones, supporting ViLTE technology. By August, continued momentum had seen the number of identified devices increase to 390.

Many of the world’s largest handset vendors now have ViLTE capable devices on the market. As of August 2019, ViLTE devices were offered by 46 vendors/brands including Askey, BBK Electronics, Blackberry, Casper, Celkon, CENTRiC, Comio, Foxconn, General Mobile, GiONEE, HMD, HTC, Huaquin Telecom Technology, Huawei, Infinix, Infocus, Intex, Itel, Karbonn, Kult, Lanix, Lava, Lenovo, LG, LYF (Reliance Digital), Micromax, Mobiistar, Motorola, Panasonic, Reach, Samsung, Sonim, Sony Mobile, Spice Devices, Swipe Technologies, TCL, Tecno, Vestel, Xiaomi, YU (Micromax), Yulong Computer, Ziox, and ZTE. iPhones don’t support ViLTE.

== See also ==
- LTE (telecommunication)
- Voice over LTE
