= NemHandel =

Danish e-invoicing infrastructure

NemHandel is a Danish e-invoicing infrastructure, developed by the National IT and Telecom Agency and launched in 2007. NemHandel is based on open standards (including the Universal Business Language, Reliable Asynchronous Secure Profile (RASP), and UDDI), open source components, and digital certificates. It was launched as part of a Danish Government Globalisation initiative in 2005 under the auspices of Prime Minister Anders Fogh Rasmussen.

The public sector in Denmark receives more than 15 million electronic invoices every year from approximately 150,000 suppliers. Non-electronic invoices for a public sector institution will be rejected. There are more than 30,000 public sector e-invoicing end points. An end point can be everything from a municipality to a kindergarten or even a department within a public sector institution. End points are addressed via Global Location Numbers or via Company Registration Numbers (called CVR-numbers in Denmark).

== History ==
NemHandel was mandated by law in February 2005. The initial version was based on traditional Electronic data interchange (EDI) methods in combination with an early version of Universal Business Language. The current version of NemHandel was launched in 2007 and is based on modern internet technologies.
