= Magenta Telekom =

Austrian telecommunications company

T-Mobile Austria GmbH
- Trade name: Magenta Telekom
- Formerly: T-Mobile Austria
- Company type: Subsidiary
- Industry: Telecommunications
- Predecessor: UPC Austria
- Founded: 1977; 49 years ago (as Telekabel Wien); 1996; 30 years ago (as max.mobil); 2002; 24 years ago (as T-Mobile Austria)
- Headquarters: Vienna, Austria
- Area served: Austria
- Key people: Thomas Kicker (CEO)
- Products: Mobile telephony Wireless broadband Internet; CATV
- Revenue: €1,49 billion (2025)
- Number of employees: 2200 (2025)
- Parent: Deutsche Telekom
- Website: magenta.at

T-Mobile Austria GmbH, trading as Magenta Telekom, is the second largest mobile and fixed company in Austria. It is owned by Deutsche Telekom. In 2022 it had 5.2 million customers. Its CEO is Thomas Kicker since 1 August 2025.

== History ==
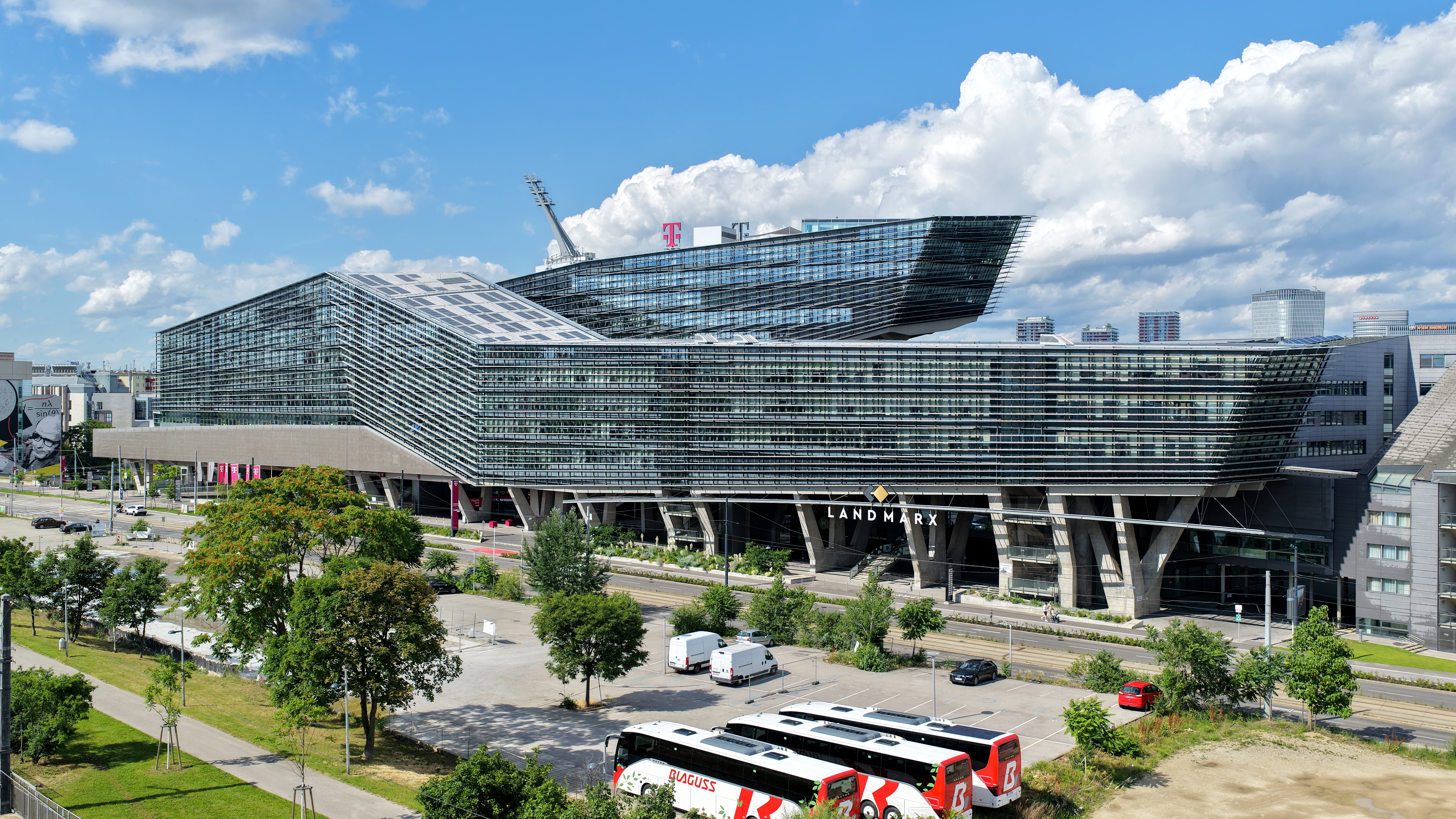
T-Mobile Austria headquarters in Landstraße, Vienna (June 2026)

The company was founded as max.mobil in 1996 by the Ö-Call consortium. In 2000, the company was bought by Deutsche Telekom. In 2002, max.mobil was renamed to T-Mobile Austria. In 2019, there was a merger of the companies UPC Austria and T-Mobile Austria, resulting in Magenta Telekom.

=== tele.ring acquisition ===
In 2005, T-Mobile Austria acquired mobile provider tele.ring from its parent company Western Wireless Corporation for 1.3 billion euros, and transformed it into its own lower-cost flanker brand. The tele.ring branding was discontinued on 23 March 2020.

=== UPC Austria acquisition ===
In December 2017, T-Mobile Austria announced it would acquire cable provider UPC Austria (originally founded in 1977 as Telekabel Wien) from its parent company Liberty Global for 1.9 billion euros. The acquisition was approved by the European Commission on 10 July 2018.

The company announced plans to retire the "T-Mobile" and "UPC" brands in 2019, merging the companies under a single "T" brand. The new brand name was announced on the evening of 6 May 2019.

== Innovation ==
In 2008, T-Mobile was the first mobile communications provider in Austria to introduce the iPhone, followed by the first Android device in 2009 and the first Windows Phone 8 in 2012. On October 19, 2010, T-Mobile launched Austria's first LTE network in Innsbruck. In February 2018, T-Mobile became the first mobile communications provider worldwide to present the first drone flight via 5G, the successor technology to LTE/4G. With the conclusion of the 5G frequency auction in early March 2019, Magenta Telekom acquired usage rights to expand the 5G communications standard throughout Austria. Based on these frequencies, Magenta Telekom launched the first 5G mobile stations on March 26, 2019, primarily in rural areas. By the end of 2022, Magenta had 2,440 locations throughout Austria where 5G is available, which corresponds to 5G coverage of around 55 percent of all households and businesses.

=== Fiber optic expansion ===
At the end of 2022, Magenta Telekom offered broadband customers around 1.55 million gigabit connections, providing gigabit internet to almost a third of all Austrian households and businesses. In August 2022, Magenta Telekom and French investor Meridiam agreed to form a strategic partnership for Austria's largest private fiber optic expansion initiative. The aim is to enable the expansion of high-speed internet connections throughout Austria.

By its own figures, Magenta Telekom's network achieves 98.5% coverage of Austrian households with 2G (voice telephony) and 94% of the population with 3G (data). At the end of 2022, the LTE network reached 98.2% of the Austrian population. Magenta relies on Huawei technology for its own network.

== Market shares ==
Market shares in mobile communications stood at 25.0% at the end of 2024 and at 6.6 million SIM cards in mid-2025. By mid-2025, Magenta Telekom had 1.1 million broadband Internet customers.

== See also ==
- List of mobile network operators in Europe
