= SRVCC =

Single Radio Voice Call Continuity (SRVCC) provides an interim solution for handing over VoLTE (Voice over LTE) calls, which use the IMS system, to be made to 2G/3G networks. The voice calls on LTE network are meant to be packet switched. To make it inter operable with existing networks, these calls are to be handed over to Circuit switched calls in GSM/WCDMA networks. QoS is ensured by SRVCC operators for calls made.

3GPP also standardized SRVCC to provide easy handovers from LTE network to GSM/UMTS network.
