= Aquafon =

Aquafon GSM
- Company type: State owned, Telecommunications
- Industry: Telecommunications
- Founded: 2003
- Products: Internet systems
- Website: aquafon.com

Aquafon is a state run telecommunications company in Abkhazia. In 2014 it had 80,000 subscriptions.

== History ==
Aquafon was established March 6, 2003, and its network became operational on July 13 of that year. By April 2007, the number of subscriptions had reached 50,000 and, in 2008, this number had further risen to 80,000.

In summer 2008, Aquafon began to provide GPRS and video call services in test mode and officially launched its 3G network with HSDPA support on September 30.

== Ownership ==
51% of Aquafon's shares are owned by Mondeo Holdings, an offshore company based in the British Virgin Islands. Mondeo Holdings is in turn 100% owned by Bermuda based ComTel Eastern, which also owns 31% of MegaFon and 50% of Sky Link (Russia).

== Competition ==
Until 2006, Aquafon held a monopoly on the mobile telephone market of Abkhazia. In 2006, a second company, A-Mobile, started to provide services.

== See also ==
- List of mobile network operators in Europe
