= Multi-SIM card =

Multi-SIM technology allows cloning up to 12 GSM SIM cards (of format COMP128v1) into one card. The subscriber can leave the original cards in a secure place and use only the multi-SIM card in day-to-day life.

For telecom operator-provided cards, only the Group MSISDN number is known to multi-SIM subscribers. Member-SIM MSISDN is transparent to the subscriber. Messages sent to member SIM are delivered to the Group MSISDN.

Multi-SIM allows switching among (up to) 12 stored numbers from the phone's main menu. A new menu entry in the subscriber’s phone automatically appears after inserting the multi-SIM card into the cell phone.

Only one of the member cards may be active at a time.

Modern SIM cards from many mobile operators are not compatible with multi-SIM technology and may not be cloned. Multi-SIM technology is a result of poor security algorithms used in the encryption of the first generation of GSM SIM cards, commonly called COMP128v1. SIM cloning is now more difficult to perform, as more and more mobile operators are moving towards newer encryption methods, such as COMP128v2 or COMP128v3. SIM cloning is still possible in some countries such as Russia, Iran and China.

SIM cards issued before June 2002 most likely are COMP128v1 SIM cards, thus clonable.
