= Voice over NR =

High-speed wireless communication functionality

Voice over New Radio, Voice over 5G, or Voice over 5G Standalone (acronym VoNR, Vo5G, or Vo5GSA) is a high-speed wireless communication standard for voice services over 5G networks, utilizing mobile phones, data terminals, IoT devices, and wearables. Like 4G networks, 5G does not natively support voice calls traditionally carried over circuit-switched technology. Instead, voice communication is transmitted over the IP network, similar to IPTV services. To address this, VoNR is implemented, allowing voice calls to be carried over the 5G network using the same packet-switched infrastructure as other IP-based services, such as video streaming and messaging.

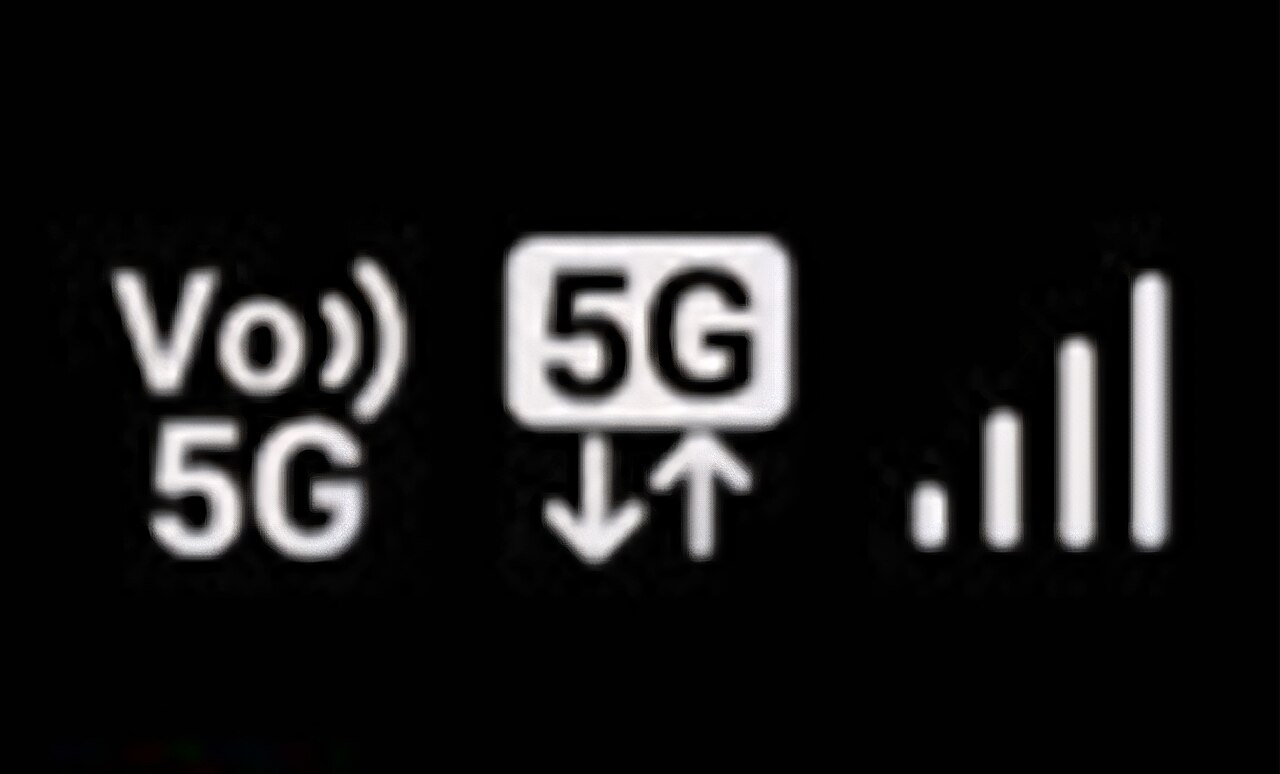
Icon showing VoNR (Voice over 5G) active in the notification bar of a Samsung Galaxy device

Similar to how Voice over LTE enables voice calls on 4G networks, VoNR serves as the 5G equivalent for voice communication, but it requires a 5G standalone (SA) network to function. VoNR offers better voice quality than its 4G predecessor, primarily due to the inherent lower latency of 5G NR, allowing for faster call setup and improved overall communication. Additionally, VoNR removes the LTE anchor, enabling the voice call to stay entirely within the 5G network.

VoNR calls are generally charged at the same rate as other calls, and to make a VoNR call, the device, its firmware, and the mobile telephone provider must all support the service and work together in the specific area.

As of 2025 5G Standalone, and hence VoNR, is not widely available globally. While in the US, carriers like T-Mobile and Verizon are expanding access to 5G Standalone and VoNR nationwide, other nations may decide to take a more conservative and phased approach to adoption.

== See also ==
- IMT-2020 – the International Telecommunication Union standards
- List of 5G NR networks
- 5G
