= A-Mobile =

A-Mobile СП ООО «А-Мобайл»
- Company type: limited liability company
- Industry: telecommunications
- Founded: 2006
- Headquarters: Sukhum, Abkhazia
- Area served: the main inhabited areas of Abkhazia covering 95% of its inhabitants
- Products: mobile telephony
- Website: a-mobile.biz

A-Mobile is the second mobile phone operator of Abkhazia behind Aquafon, both in number of subscriptions and in age.

== History ==
A-Mobile started its operations on November 25, 2006 in Sukhumi. By April 2007 it counted 12,000 subscribers. Since June 10, 2007 it provides to its clients international roaming in Russia through Beeline, and to Russian users international roaming in Abkhazia. By September 2007 the number of subscriptions had risen to 21,000. On March 1, 2008, A-Mobile started to provide GPRS services.

== Competition ==
A-Mobile's main competitor is Aquafon.

== See also ==
- List of mobile network operators in Europe
