= National IT and Telecom Agency =

Former government agency of Denmark

The National IT and Telecom Agency (Danish: It- og Telestyrelsen) was a Danish agency under the Ministry of Science, Technology and Innovation.

The main task of the Agency was to safeguard the public development in the IT and telecommunications, as the agency was to establish the general rules for public delivery of IT and telecommunications services.

It was abolished by the Thorning-Schmidt II Cabinet and its tasks reassigned to the ministries of the Danish Business Authority and the Danish Agency for Digitisation.
