= QoS Class Identifier =

Mechanism in LTE networks

QoS Class Identifier (QCI) is a mechanism used in 3GPP Long Term Evolution (LTE) networks to ensure carrier traffic is allocated appropriate Quality of Service (QoS). Different carrier traffic requires different QoS and therefore different QCI values. QCI value 9 is typically used for the default carrier of a UE/PDN for non privileged subscribers.

== Background ==
To ensure that carrier traffic in LTE networks is appropriately handled, a mechanism is needed to classify the different types of carriers into different classes, with each class having appropriate QoS parameters for the traffic type. Examples of the QoS parameters include Guaranteed Bit Rate (GBR) or non-Guaranteed Bit Rate (non-GBR), Priority Handling, Packet Delay Budget and Packet Error Loss rate. This overall mechanism is called QCI.

== Mechanism ==
The QoS concept as used in LTE networks is class-based, where each carrier type is assigned one QoS Class Identifier (QCI) by the network. The QCI is a scalar that is used within the access network (namely the eNodeB) as a reference to node specific parameters that control packet forwarding treatment, for example scheduling weight, admission thresholds and link-layer protocol configuration.

The QCI is also mapped to transport network layer parameters in the relevant Evolved Packet Core (EPC) core network nodes (for example, the PDN Gateway (P-GW), Mobility Management Entity (MME) and Policy and Charging Rules Function (PCRF)), by preconfigured QCI to Differentiated Services Code Point (DSCP) mapping.

According to 3GPP TS 23.203, 9 QCI values in Rel-8 (13 QCIs Rel-12, 15 QCIs Rel-14) are standardized and associated with QCI characteristics in terms of packet forwarding treatment that the carrier traffic receives edge-to-edge between the UE and the P-GW. Scheduling priority, resource type, packet delay budget and packet error loss rate are the set of characteristics defined by the 3GPP standard and they should be understood as guidelines for the pre-configuration of node specific parameters to ensure that applications/services mapped to a given QCI receive the same level of QoS in multi-vendor environments as well as in roaming scenarios. The QCI characteristics are not signalled on any interface.

The following table illustrates the standardized characteristics as defined in the 3GPP TS 23.203 standard "Policy and Charging Control Architecture".

QCI	Resource type	Priority	Packet delay budget	Packet error loss rate	Example services
1	GBR	2	100ms	10^{−2}	Conversational Voice
2	GBR	4	150ms	10^{−3}	Conversational Video (Live Streaming)
3	GBR	3	50ms	10^{−3}	Real Time Gaming, V2X messages
4	GBR	5	300ms	10^{−6}	Non-Conversational Video (Buffered Streaming)
65	GBR	0.7	75ms	10^{−2}	Mission Critical user plane Push To Talk voice (e.g., MCPTT)
66	GBR	2	100ms	10^{−2}	Non-Mission-Critical user plane Push To Talk voice
67	GBR	1.5	100ms	10^{−3}	Mission Critical Video user plane
75	GBR	2.5	50ms	10^{−2}	V2X (Vehicle-to-everything) messages
5	non-GBR	1	100ms	10^{−6}	IMS Signalling
6	non-GBR	6	300ms	10^{−6}	Video (Buffered Streaming) TCP-Based (for example, www, email, chat, ftp, p2p and the like)
7	non-GBR	7	100ms	10^{−3}	Voice, Video (Live Streaming), Interactive Gaming
8	non-GBR	8	300ms	10^{−6}	Video (Buffered Streaming) TCP-Based (for example, www, email, chat, ftp, p2p and the like)
9	non-GBR	9	300ms	10^{−6}	Video (Buffered Streaming) TCP-Based (for example, www, email, chat, ftp, p2p and the like). Typically used as default carrier
69	non-GBR	0.5	60ms	10^{−6}	Mission Critical delay sensitive signalling (e.g., MC-PTT signalling)
70	non-GBR	5.5	200ms	10^{−6}	Mission Critical Data (e.g. example services are the same as QCI 6/8/9)
79	non-GBR	6.5	50ms	10^{−2}	V2X messages
80	non-GBR	6.8	10ms	10^{−6}	Low latency eMBB applications (TCP/UDP-based); Augmented Reality
82	GBR	1.9	10ms	10^{−4}	Discrete Automation (small packets)
83	GBR	2.2	10ms	10^{−4}	Discrete Automation (big packets)
84	GBR	2.4	30ms	10^{−5}	Intelligent Transport Systems
85	GBR	2.1	5ms	10^{−5}	Electricity Distribution- high voltage

Every QCI (GBR and Non-GBR) is associated with a Priority level. Priority level 0.5 is the highest Priority level. If congestion is encountered, the lowest Priority level traffic (highest Priority number!) would be the first to be discarded.

QCI-65, QCI-66, QCI-69 and QCI-70 were introduced in 3GPP TS 23.203 Rel-12.

QCI-75 and QCI-79 were introduced in 3GPP TS 23.203 Rel-14.

QCI-67 was introduced in 3GPP TS 23.203 Rel-15.

== See also ==
- LTE
