= 33-centimeter band =

Amateur radio frequency band

The 33-centimeter or 900 MHz band is a portion of the UHF radio spectrum internationally allocated to amateur radio on a secondary basis. It ranges from 902 to 928 MHz and is unique to ITU Region 2 (Americas). It is primarily used for very local communications as opposed to bands lower in frequency. However, very high antennas with high gain have shown 33 centimeters can provide good long-range communications almost equal to systems on lower frequencies such as the 70 centimeter band. The band is also used by industrial, scientific, and medical (ISM) equipment, as well as low-powered unlicensed devices. Amateur stations must accept harmful interference caused by ISM users but may receive protection from unlicensed devices.

The 900 MHz frequency is also used as a reference band e.g. to express the total power or impact of the electric field "E" - expressed in V/m - or the power density "S" - expressed in W/m^{2} - of the overall cellular frequencies emission caused by all frequencies s.a. the four bands 850 / 900 / 1,800 / 1,900 MHz – which many GSM phones support and mobile phone operators use - used by all mobile phone operators at the same time to a certain space where e.g. humans are exposed to these frequencies over a certain span of time. More: Mobile phone radiation and health section.

In ITU Region 3, New Zealand domestically allocates 915 MHz to 928 MHz to amateurs. In Australia, this spectrum is allocated to radiolocation and scientific-medical services.

== History ==
- Origin as a replacement for 1215-1240 MHz (removed from the 23-centimeter band allocation in 1979)
  - Relation to WARC 1979
  - Relation to GPS allocation

The 33–centimeter band has a somewhat short history, being one of the newest amateur radio bands. The Radio Regulations of the International Telecommunication Union allow amateur radio operations in the frequency range from 902.0 to 928.0 MHz.

=== The beginning ===
In 1985, the Federal Communications Commission allocated the frequency band between 902 and 928 MHz to Part 18 ISM (industrial, scientific, and medical) devices. In that proceeding, the band was also allocated to the Amateur Radio Service on a secondary basis meaning amateurs could use the band as long as they accepted interference from, and did not cause interference to, primary users.

=== 900 MHz cordless phones ===
In the mid-1990s, many cordless phone manufacturers started producing phones that used the lower and upper ends of the 33–centimeter band for communication between the handset and base. These phones, which are regulated by Part 15 of the FCC's regulations, have made amateur use of the upper and lower end of the 33 centimeter band somewhat tricky due to the number of these phones used by the general population. Part 15 devices, by law, must accept interference from any licensed radio service with which they share frequencies.

=== 900 MHz wireless networking ===
In the early 1990s, wireless computer networking was just becoming affordable. Several competing technologies emerged that made use of the 902-928 MHz Part 15 band, such as:

- NCR/AT&T/DEC/Lucent WaveLAN. 915 MHz, 250 mW transmit power. Obsolete, but still in use in certain areas.
- Aironet (now Cisco) ARLAN. 902-928 MHz with 12 channels, 450 mW transmit power. Obsolete, but still in use in certain areas.
- Alvarion BreezeACCESS 900. 902-928 MHz, 200 mW transmit power. Still being sold and in use in certain areas as of 2008.
- A now defunct commercial user of 900 MHz wireless networking was Ricochet. They used 900 MHz for the "last mile" connection to the user in an early wide area mobile wireless network.
- Motorola Canopy is also used by WISPs depending on the Line-of-sight propagation
- XG Technology, Inc. xMax. 902-928 MHz. Less than 1 W. A cognitive radio system still being sold and in use as of 2011.

=== ISM: 915 MHz Long Range WAN (LoRaWAN) ===
- Frequency range from 902 MHz to 928 MHz as an unlicensed industrial scientific and medical (ISM) frequency band for North America.
- Started in 2009, LoRaWAN were targeting the metering industry and aimed at adding wireless communication capabilities for gas, water and electricity meters. For this purpose, they used Chirp Spread Spectrum (CSS) modulation technology, a technology widely in use for sonar in the maritime industry and radar in aviation.

The European equivalent is the SRD860 band. See also List of WLAN channels § 860/900 MHz (802.11ah).

=== Walkie talkies ===
MotoTalk or with Nextel, DirectTalk, uses the 900 MHz Part 15 band. It uses FHSS and employs 10 "channels" and 15 "privacy codes". This is available as a feature on several of the walkie-talkie phones, for "off network" simplex communications.

Motorola makes a line of walkie-talkies (the DTR family) which are FHSS digital units. They are very similar to the DirectTalk-capable iDEN cellphones, even sharing some accessory items, but they can not interoperate with DirectTalk units.

Trisquare made a line of walkie-talkies (the eXtreme Radio Service family) that were also license free FHSS units, operating in the 900 MHz band. They were similar to DirectTalk but not compatible.

== Current amateur uses ==
Today, the 33 centimeter band is rapidly becoming popular with many UHF enthusiasts. Currently, it is used by amateurs for a variety of purposes.

=== Amateur television ===
Amateur television is a popular activity on the 33 centimeter band, and some manufacturers produced ATV equipment for this band. The first repeater to use the band, the NU6X/R (Amateur TV Network) on 923.25 MHz, was activated and used at the minute the FCC allowed amateur use of the band and featured in QST Magazine. The repeater moved to 919.25 MHz and call changed to W6ATN because AVM part 90 service at 927 MHz began operation as a primary user of the band.

=== CW and single sideband ===
Amateurs who are involved in contesting use home-made or commercially available transverters to operate CW and SSB on the lower end of the band, either just above 903 MHz or just above 902 MHz. SSB/CW operations usually use horizontal polarization for most contacts. VHF/UHF contests are conducted by the ARRL Contest managers several times each year to encourage operations across all ham bands. Contacts must be made in the simplex mode - that is, without using a repeater. Any mode (FM, SSB, CW) can be used. Contact scoring is higher for 33 cm than the lower bands (6m through 70 cm).

=== FM repeaters ===
Until recently, no amateur radio equipment manufacturer has ever made an FM repeater for the 33 centimeter band. But nevertheless, amateurs have adapted other equipment for use in this band. Amateurs who wish to build a repeater and those who wish to use that repeater must do so using modified commercial equipment designed for use in the mid-800 MHz and mid-900 MHz range. The bulk of modified commercial equipment is manufactured by two companies, Motorola and Kenwood.

In 2012, the first two-way 900 MHz radio made specifically for the Amateur Service was introduced by Alinco. The DJ-G29T is a dual band portable radio operating on the 222 MHz and 900 MHz bands and is fully programmable.

==== Building repeaters ====
The ARRL (American Radio Relay League) has specified that repeaters on the 33 centimeter band use a split of -12 MHz with inputs between 906 and 909 MHz and outputs between 918 and 921 MHz. However, the majority of amateur 33 centimeter band amateur repeaters use a split of -25 MHz with inputs between 902 and 903 MHz and outputs between 927 and 928 MHz. There are several reasons behind this. The primary reason being that most amateur repeaters in this band are built from commercial equipment that has been modified to transmit and receive in the amateur 33 centimeter band and modification complexity increases rapidly as target frequencies are moved further from the original design frequencies. A 25 MHz split results in frequencies fairly close to the original frequencies this commercial equipment was designed for resulting in relatively simple modifications. As well, spectrum analyzer tests consistently show the noise floor to be considerably higher near the center of the band due to other non-amateur services making the quieter frequencies near the band limits more desirable. Finally, the 12 MHz split requires high quality and more expensive duplexer devices to isolate the repeater receiver from the repeater transmitter when sharing a single antenna (as most repeaters do) whereas the 25 MHz split provides sufficient frequency separation such that separate antenna for transmit and receive with 20 feet or more of vertical separation often works well and eliminates the need for expensive duplexers as long as the repeater transmitter is limited to 15 to 20 watts of output power.

With the explosion in popularity of Nextel phones with a push to talk feature, the marketplace has seen a flood of newer 800 and 900 MHz commercial mobile radios that are designed to the following specifications:

- 800 MHz Radios:
  - Transmit: 806 - 821 MHz and 851 - 870 MHz
  - Receive: 851 - 870 MHz
- 900 MHz Radios:
  - Transmit: 896 - 902 MHz and 935 - 941 MHz
  - Receive: 935 - 941 MHz

The receivers on many of these modern 800 MHz radios can be easily modified to receive higher than 870 MHz, to about 904 MHz with good sensitivity. In addition, the transmitters on many of the aforementioned 900 MHz radios can be easily modified to transmit lower than 935 MHz, to about 926 MHz with acceptable power output. With this in mind, many amateurs have opted to set up repeaters with -25 MHz splits using modified 800 MHz radios as receivers and modified 900 MHz radios as transmitters.

A number of resources are available for amateurs to build repeaters that can be used on the 33 cm band.

Resources are also available via several e-mail discussion groups (such as the Yahoo Groups: "AR902 MHz" and "900 MHz") where information regarding conversion of other brands commonly used (such as Kenwood, EF Johnson, and GE/Ericsson) can be found/discussed.

The advent of issues involving interference to the PAVE PAWS RADAR systems located on the East and West coasts of the United States has pushed many amateur repeater operators to vacate the 70 cm band in favor of 33 cm, and proliferation of 33 cm repeaters has understandably increased exponentially in the past few years.

==== Using repeaters ====
Amateurs who use local repeaters on the 33 centimeter band use commercial handheld or mobile 900 MHz radios. As shown above, these radios can transmit between 896 and 902 MHz and receive between 935 and 941 MHz. Getting many of these radios to transmit on the repeater's input frequency (between 902 and 903 MHz) and receive on the repeater's output frequency (between 927 and 928 MHz) usually requires very little or no circuit modification, depending on the choice of radio. For instance, the Motorola model GTX (mobile and handheld versions) do not require any hardware modifications at all. Using these commercial radios however, has one handicap: flexibility. Unlike most other ham radio bands, in which one can tune to any frequency within an amateur band, modification of "Channelized" commercial radios maintains them in a channelized state. Therefore, once programmed, the frequencies they operate on cannot be changed at will without re-programming. However, since almost all FM radio equipment used on the 33 cm band amateur band was previously designed for and internally programmed for frequencies outside the 33 cm band edges, reprogramming is always necessary to get them working properly between 902 and 928 MHz after any physical modifications have been made. This includes the GTX.

=== Linking ===
Many amateurs have found the 33 centimeter band to be ideal for linking repeaters together. Some of the biggest linked repeater systems in the United States use the 33 centimeter band as their link backbone.

=== Packet radio and mesh networking ===
The 33cm band is commonly used for LoRa communications, including decentralized amateur mesh networks like Meshtastic and MeshCore. The 70cm band is also sometimes used, however the 33cm band remains the most popular due to the fact that it can be used without a license in many countries, and provides a good balance of bandwidth and range.

== Propagation characteristics ==
Signal propagation on the 33-centimeter band is very dependent on the transmitting and receiving antenna's line of sight. Because of this, many wide-area coverage systems like repeaters are located on top of large hills and mountains which overlook a vast area. This ensures that the transmitting antenna is higher than terrestrial obstructions such as trees and buildings. Assuming that the transmitting antenna's wavelength, height above average terrain, and effective radiated power is equal, a transmitted signal on 33 centimeters will, generally speaking, usually travel about 3/4 of the distance that the same signal would if transmitted on the 70 centimeter band. The reader is advised to note that receiver front-end noise figure and antenna gain are the defining factors in line-of-sight signal propagation in the local area.

The 33 centimeter band offers excellent building penetration characteristics since the wavelength is relatively small and can fit through windows more easily than signals lower in frequency.

In many areas, the 33 centimeter band also has a very low noise floor as compared to bands lower in frequency.

== Popular equipment used on the 33-centimeter band ==
- EF Johnson models 8615, 8640, 8644 and 8655
- GE DTMX 9315B (TMX)
- Ericsson MDX
- GE Mastr II
- GE Mastr III
- MA/Com Orion
- Kenwood TK-480 / Kenwood TK-481
- Kenwood TK-980 / Kenwood TK-981
- Kenwood TK-931
- Alinco DJ-G29T
- Motorola MaxTrac
- Motorola Spectra
- Motorola MSF 5000
- Motorola GTX
- Motorola MTX
- Motorola MCS 2000
- Motorola XTS 2500
- Motorola XTS 1500
- Motorola DTR
- Retevis RT10
- TAIT T800 Series
- "eXRS" 900 MHz FHSS Part 15 radios
- ExpressLRS transceivers
- Downeast Microwave 902-144HP3 transverter
- Q5 Signal transverters L33-28HP or L33-144HP (28Mhz in 900Mhz out, 144Mhz in 900 Mhz out) and linear amplifiers.
- M2 directional gain antennas for 33 cm

Range	Band	ITU Region 1	ITU Region 2	ITU Region 3
LF	2200 m	135.7–137.8 kHz		
MF	630 m	472–479 kHz		
MF	160 m	1.810–1.850 MHz	1.800–2.000 MHz	
HF	80 / 75 m	3.500–3.800 MHz	3.500–4.000 MHz	3.500–3.900 MHz
HF	60 m	5.3515–5.3665 MHz		
HF	40 m	7.000–7.200 MHz	7.000–7.300 MHz	7.000–7.200 MHz
HF	30 m^{[t2]}	10.100–10.150 MHz		
HF	20 m	14.000–14.350 MHz		
HF	17 m^{[t2]}	18.068–18.168 MHz		
HF	15 m	21.000–21.450 MHz		
HF	12 m^{[t2]}	24.890–24.990 MHz		
HF	10 m	28.000–29.700 MHz		
VHF	8 m^{[t3]}	40.000–40.700 MHz	—N/a	
VHF	6 m	50.000–52.000 MHz (50.000–54.000 MHz)^{[t4]}	50.000–54.000 MHz	
VHF	5 m^{[t3]}	58.000–60.100 MHz	—N/a	
VHF	4 m^{[t3]}	70.000–70.500 MHz	—N/a	
VHF	2 m	144.000–146.000 MHz	144.000–148.000 MHz	
VHF	1.25 m	—N/a	220.000–225.000 MHz	—N/a
UHF	70 cm	430.000–440.000 MHz	430.000–440.000 MHz (420.000–450.000 MHz)^{[t4]}	
UHF	33 cm	—N/a	902.000–928.000 MHz	—N/a
UHF	23 cm	1.240–1.300 GHz		
UHF	13 cm	2.300–2.450 GHz		
SHF	9 cm	3.400–3.475 GHz^{[t4]}	3.300–3.500 GHz	
SHF	5 cm	5.650–5.850 GHz	5.650–5.925 GHz	5.650–5.850 GHz
SHF	3 cm	10.000–10.500 GHz		
SHF	1.2 cm	24.000–24.250 GHz		
EHF	6 mm	47.000–47.200 GHz		
EHF	4 mm^{[t4]}	75.500 GHz^{[t3]} – 81.500 GHz	76.000–81.500 GHz	
EHF	2.5 mm	122.250–123.000 GHz		
EHF	2 mm	134.000–141.000 GHz		
EHF	1 mm	241.000–250.000 GHz		
THF	Sub-mm	Some administrations have authorized spectrum for amateur use in this region; others have declined to regulate frequencies above 300 GHz.		
[t1]	All allocations are subject to variation by country. For simplicity, only common allocations found internationally are listed. See a band's article for specifics.			
[t2]	HF allocation created at the 1979 World Administrative Radio Conference. These are commonly called the "WARC bands".			
[t3]	This is not mentioned in the ITU's Table of Frequency Allocations, but many individual administrations have commonly adopted this allocation under "Article 4.4".			
[t4]	This includes a currently active footnote allocation mentioned in the ITU's Table of Frequency Allocations. These allocations may only apply to a group of countries.			
See also: Radio spectrum, Electromagnetic spectrum
