= MoIP =

MoIP or MOIP can mean:

- Mobile communications over IP
- Mobile VoIP
- Modem over IP
- Modem over VoIP
- Media over Internet Protocol
- Meetings Over IP
- Messaging Over Internet Protocol
- Missile On Internal Power
- MPEG over IP, see Professional video over IP
- Meeting of Important People, an American indie rock band
