= Forfone =

forfone
- Developer: toolani ltd.
- Stable release: iOS 3.2.3, Android 1.5.0
- Operating system: iOS 4.0 and higher Android 2.2 and higher
- Type: VoIP, social network
- Licence: Proprietary
- Website: www.forfone.com

forfone is a free VoIP application that enables users to make calls, send and share text messages, photos, and their current location. The App does not require additional registration or a user account but allows direct access to mobile and landline networks worldwide via Wi-Fi, LTE, 3G or UMTS.

Reachability is ensured through push-notifications. Therefore, the application does not need to be open or running in the background to answer calls or receive messages. The application is compatible with iPhone, iPod Touch or Android devices and runs on iOS 4.0 or higher or Android 2.2 or higher. forfone is a VoIP and messaging application that aims to make internet telephony as easy and intuitive as making a normal phone call through a mobile operator.

== Data security ==
The independent Viennese research institute SBA-Research discovered security holes in messenger applications. The researchers were able to take over accounts and send free text messages from the servers of many tested applications. However, it was not possible to take over accounts or send or receive user text messages on forfone and 3 other applications tested.

== See also ==
- Mobile VoIP
