= Next-generation network =

IP-based network for voice, video, and data

The next-generation network (NGN) is a body of key architectural changes in telecommunication core and access networks. The general idea behind the NGN is that one network transports all information and services (voice, data, and all sorts of media such as video) by encapsulating these into IP packets, similar to those used on the Internet. NGNs are commonly built around the Internet Protocol, and therefore the term all IP is also sometimes used to describe the transformation of formerly telephone-centric networks toward NGN.

NGN is a different concept from Future Internet, which is more focused on the evolution of Internet in terms of the variety and interactions of services offered.

== Introduction of NGN ==
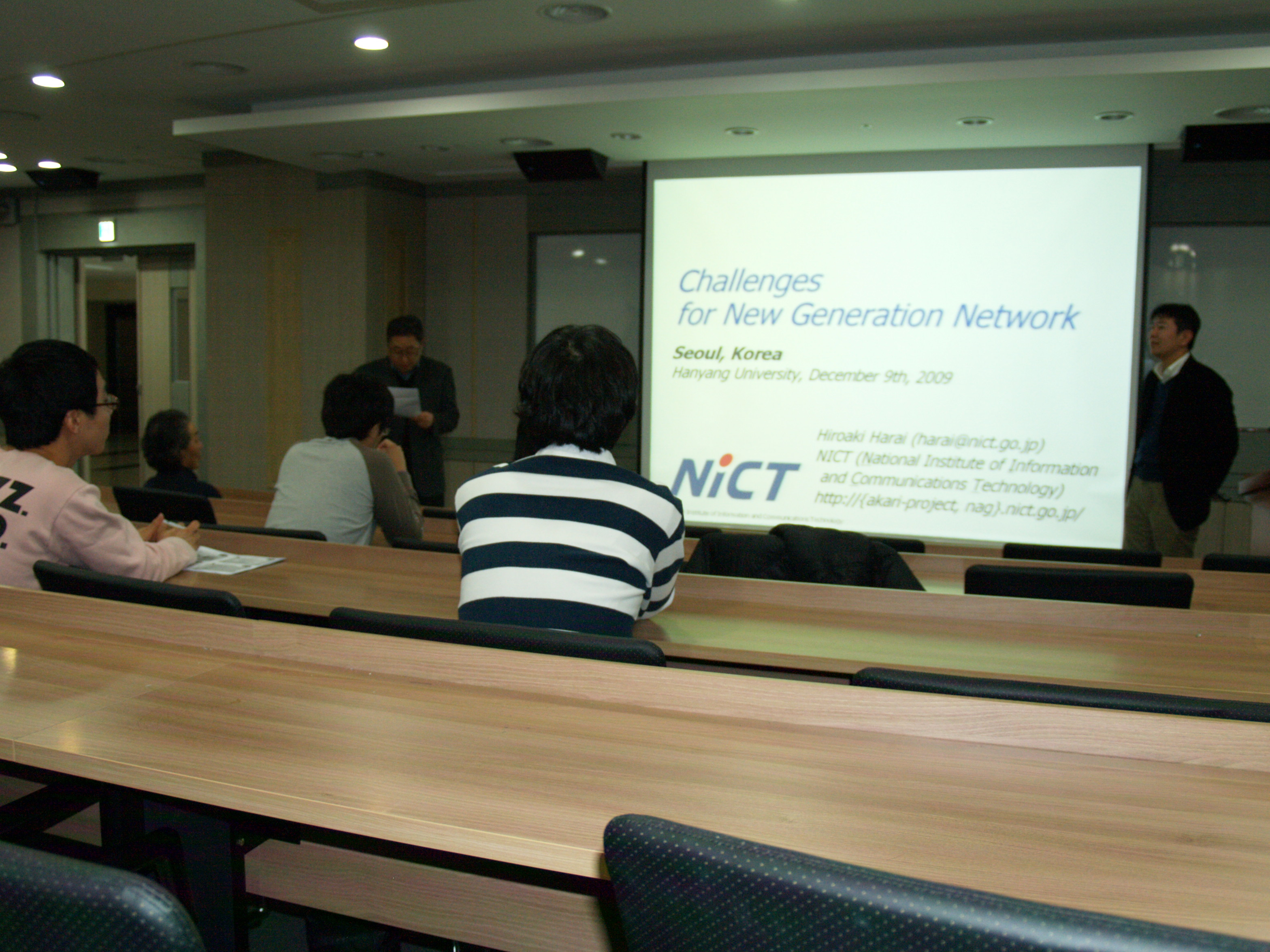
NGN Seminar in Fusion Technology Center by NICT researcher

According to ITU-T, the definition is:

A next-generation network (NGN) is a packet-based network which can provide services including telecommunication services, and is able to make use of multiple broadband, quality of service-enabled transport technologies and in which service-related functions are independent from underlying transport-related technologies. It offers unrestricted access by users to different service providers. It supports generalized mobility which will allow consistent and ubiquitous provision of services to users.tsbedh. "NGN Working definition". www.itu.int. Archived from the original on 2005-09-11.

From a practical perspective, NGN involves three main architectural changes:

In the core network, NGN implies a consolidation of several (dedicated or overlay) transport networks each historically built for a different service into one core transport network (often based on IP and Ethernet). It implies amongst others the migration of voice from a circuit-switched architecture (PSTN) to VoIP, and also migration of legacy services such as X.25, Frame Relay.

In the wired access network, NGN implies the migration from the dual system of legacy voice next to xDSL setup in local exchanges to a converged setup in which the DSLAMs integrate voice ports or VoIP, making it possible to remove the voice switching infrastructure from the exchange.Next-generation networks: the MSAN strategy Retrieved on 2009-08-28.

In the cable access network, NGN convergence implies migration of constant bit rate voice to CableLabs PacketCable standards that provide VoIP and SIP services. Both services ride over DOCSIS as the cable data layer standard.

In an NGN, there is a distinct functional separation between the transport (connectivity) portion of the network and the services that run on top of that transport. This means that whenever a provider wants to enable a new service, they can do so by defining it directly at the service layer without considering transport layer details. Increasingly applications, including voice, tend to be independent of the access network and reside more on end-user devices (phones, PCs, set-top boxes).

== Underlying technology components ==
Next-generation networks rely on core Internet technologies including Internet Protocol (IP) and Multiprotocol Label Switching (MPLS). At the application level, Session Initiation Protocol (SIP) serves as the primary signaling protocol, heavily utilized within the IP Multimedia Subsystem (IMS) framework defined by ETSI and 3GPP.

For voice applications, a critical component is the Softswitch—a programmable device that controls Voice over IP (VoIP) calls and interfaces with legacy PSTN networks via Signalling Gateways and Media Gateways.

== Global Implementations and Modern Migration ==
The deployment of NGN architectures evolved from early 2000s regional trials into complete, nationwide transformations of telecommunications infrastructure:

Japan: The NTT Group rolled out consumer-facing NGN services under "FLET'S Hikari" variants. The long-term migration of NTT's core fixed-line telephone network to an all-IP infrastructure was officially completed in December 2024, followed by phased transitions from copper subscriber lines to optical fiber and mobile access.NTT East. "「固定電話」の今後について" (PDF).NIKKEI X-TECH (2024-12-25). "NTT東西の固定電話がIP網へ完全に移行、電話交換機が役割を終える".

North Macedonia: In February 2014, Makedonski Telekom completed the conversion of its entire PSTN infrastructure to an end-to-end all-IP network, making it one of the earliest European countries to fully transition."Makedonski Telekom". Archived from the original on 2017-01-06.

China: China Telecom commercially launched its Next Generation Carrying Network (CN2) using IP NGN architecture, leveraging softswitches and MPLS-optimized routing to unify legacy traffic and modern IP services over a single bearer layer."China Telecom Expands Coverage of CN2 Network; Cisco Routers Deployed to Enhance Network Potential and Business Opportunities | Business Wire". www.businesswire.com. Archived from the original on 2016-03-07.

Early European Deployments: Telecommunications operators across Europe and the UK—including BT (via its early 21CN initiatives), KPN in the Netherlands, and BTC in Bulgaria—pioneered early carrier-grade IP/MPLS transformations throughout the 2000s to support integrated voice, data, and IPTV services.

== Evolution to 5G and Cloud-Native Architectures ==
The core architectural principles pioneered by NGN—specifically service-transport decoupling, packet convergence, and softswitch control separation—form the foundation of modern 5G Standalone (SA) core networks and cloud-native Network Functions Virtualization (NFV). Whereas early NGN implementations relied heavily on dedicated hardware softswitches, modern cloud-native networks virtualize control functions onto distributed cloud infrastructure to enable dynamic scalability, low latency, and network slicing.

== See also ==
5G

Computer network

Flat IP

Mobile VoIP

IP Multimedia Subsystem (IMS)

Network convergence

Next-generation network services

Telecommunications equipment
