= WaveLAN =

Family of wireless networking technology

History of chipsets and devices

WaveLAN was a brand name for a family of wireless networking technology sold by NCR, AT&T, Lucent Technologies, and Agere Systems as well as being sold by other companies under OEM agreements. The WaveLAN name debuted on the market in 1990 and was in use until 2000, when Agere Systems renamed their products to ORiNOCO. WaveLAN laid the important foundation for the formation of IEEE 802.11 working group and the resultant creation of Wi-Fi.

WaveLAN has been used on two different families of wireless technology:

- Pre-IEEE 802.11 WaveLAN, also called Classic WaveLAN
- IEEE 802.11-compliant WaveLAN, also known as WaveLAN IEEE and ORiNOCO

== History ==
WaveLAN was originally designed by NCR Systems Engineering, later renamed into WCND (Wireless Communication and Networking Division) at Nieuwegein, in the province Utrecht in the Netherlands, a subsidiary of NCR Corporation, in 1986–7, and introduced to the market in 1990 as a wireless alternative to Ethernet and Token Ring. The next year NCR contributed the WaveLAN design to the IEEE 802 LAN/MAN Standards Committee. This led to the founding of the 802.11 Wireless LAN Working Committee which produced the original IEEE 802.11 standard, which eventually became the basis of the certification mark Wi-Fi. When NCR was acquired by AT&T in 1991, becoming the AT&T GIS (Global Information Solutions) business unit, the product name was retained, as happened two years later when the product was transferred to the AT&T GBCS (Global Business Communications Systems) business unit, and again when AT&T spun off their GBCS business unit as Lucent in 1995. The technology was also sold as WaveLAN under an OEM agreement by Epson, Hitachi, and NEC, and as the RoamAbout DS by DEC. It competed directly with Aironet's non-802.11 ARLAN lineup, which offered similar speeds, frequency ranges and hardware.

Several companies also marketed wireless bridges and routers based on the WaveLAN ISA and PC cards, like the C-Spec OverLAN, KarlNet KarlBridge, Persoft Intersect Remote Bridge, and Solectek AIRLAN/Bridge Plus. Lucent's WavePoint II access point could accommodate both the classic WaveLAN PC cards as well as the WaveLAN IEEE cards. Also, there were a number of compatible third-party products available to address niche markets such as: Digital Ocean's Grouper, Manta, and Starfish offerings for the Apple Newton and Macintosh; Solectek's 915 MHz WaveLAN parallel port adapter; Microplex's M204 WaveLAN-compatible wireless print server; NEC's Japanese-market only C&C-Net 2.4 GHz adapter for the NEC-bus; Toshiba's Japanese-market only WaveCOM 2.4 GHz adapter for the Toshiba-Bus; and Teklogix's WaveLAN-compatible Pen-based and Notebook terminals.

During this time frame, networking professionals also realized that since NetWare 3.x and 4.x supported the WaveLAN cards and came with a Multi Protocol Router module that supported the IP/IPX RIP and OSPF routing protocols, one could construct a wireless routed network using NetWare servers and WaveLAN cards for a fraction of the cost of building a wireless bridged network using WaveLAN access points. Many NetWare classes and textbooks of the time included a NetWare OS CD with a 2-person license, so potentially the only cost incurred came from hardware.

When the 802.11 protocol was ratified, Lucent began producing chipsets and PC-cards to support this new standard under the name of WaveLAN IEEE. WaveLAN was among the first products certified by the Wi-Fi Alliance, originally called the Wireless Ethernet Compatibility Association (WECA). Shortly thereafter, Lucent spun off its semiconductor division that also produced the WaveLAN chipsets as Agere Systems. On June 17, 2002 Proxim acquired the IEEE 802.11 LAN equipment business including the trademark ORiNOCO from Agere Systems. Proxim later renamed its entire 802.11 wireless networking lineup to ORiNOCO, including products based on Atheros chipsets.

== Specifications ==
Classic WaveLAN operates in the 900 MHz or 2.4 GHz ISM bands. Being a proprietary pre-802.11 protocol, it is completely incompatible with the 802.11 standard. Soon after the publication of the IEEE 802.11 standard on November 18, 1997, WaveLAN IEEE was placed on the market.

=== Hardware ===
The pre-802.11 standard WaveLAN cards were based on the Intel 82586 Ethernet PHY controller, which was a commonly used controller in its time and was found in many ISA and MCA Ethernet cards, such as the Intel EtherExpress 16 and the 3COM 3C523. The WaveLAN IEEE ISA, MCA and PCMCIA cards used Medium Access Controller (MAC), HERMES, designed specifically for 802.11 protocol support. The radio modem section was hidden from the OS, thus making the WaveLAN card appear to be a typical Ethernet card, with the radio-specific features taken care of behind the scenes.

While the 900 MHz models and the early 2.4 GHz models operated on one fixed frequency, the later 2.4 GHz cards as well as some 2.4 GHz WavePoint access points had the hardware capacity to operate over ten channels, ranging from 2.412 GHz to 2.484 GHz, with the channels available being determined by the region-specific firmware.

=== Security ===
For security, WaveLAN used a 16-bit NWID (NetWork ID) field, which yielded 65,536 potential combinations; the radio portion of the device could receive radio traffic tagged with another NWID, but the controller would discard the traffic. DES encryption (56-bit) was an option in some of the ISA and MCA cards and all of the WavePoint access points. The full-length ISA and MCA cards had a socket for an encryption chip, the half-length 915 MHz ISA cards had solder pads for a socket which was never added, and the 2.4 GHz half-length ISA cards had the chip soldered directly to the board.

For the IEEE 802.11 standard the goal was to provide data confidentiality comparable to that of a traditional wired network, using 64- and 128-bit data encryption technology. This first implementation was called “Wired Equivalent Privacy” (WEP).

There are shortcomings in WaveLAN & initial 802.11 compatible devices security strategy:

- The initial IEEE 802.11 security WEP implementation, was shown to be vulnerable to attack.

This was addressed by the 802.11i Wi-Fi Protected Access (WPA) that replaced WEP in the standard.

=== Official specifications ===
Realm	Type	Number of frequencies	Frequency	Modulation technique	Output power	Maximum data rate	Media access control	Security
US & Canada	900 MHz	1	915 MHz	DSSS/DQPSK	250 mW	2 Mbit/s	CSMA/CA	16-bit network ID and optional DES encryption
Worldwide	2.4 GHz	6	2.412 GHz, 2.422 GHz, 2.432 GHz, 2.442 GHz, 2.452 GHz, 2.462 GHz	DSSS/DQPSK	32 mW	2 Mbit/s	CSMA/CA	16-bit network ID and optional DES encryption
Europe (except France)	2.4 GHz	8	2.422 GHz, 2.425 GHz, 2.4305 GHz, 2.432 GHz, 2.442 GHz, 2.452 GHz, 2.460 GHz, 2.462 GHz	DSSS/DQPSK	32 mW	2 Mbit/s	CSMA/CA	16-bit network ID and optional DES encryption
France	2.4 GHz	2	2.460 GHz and 2.462 GHz	DSSS/DQPSK	32 mW	2 Mbit/s	CSMA/CA	16-bit network ID and optional DES encryption
Australia	2.4 GHz	4	2.422 GHz, 2.425 GHz, 2.432 GHz, 2.442 GHz	DSSS/DQPSK	32 mW	2 Mbit/s	CSMA/CA	16-bit network ID and optional DES encryption
Japan	2.4 GHz	1	2.484 GHz	DSSS/DQPSK	32 mW	2 Mbit/s	CSMA/CA	16-bit network ID and optional DES encryption

== Support ==
=== Officially released drivers ===
- Windows 3.11, 95, and NT 3.5/4.0
  - Windows 3.11, Windows 95, and 98 supported the ISA and MCA cards natively but did not provide any configuration or link diagnostics utilities.
  - Windows NT 3.51 did not natively support the WaveLAN cards, but additional drivers from Microsoft's Windows NT Driver Library were available.
- OS/2 NDIS and NetWare Requester
- LAN Manager/IBM LAN Server
- Artisoft LANtastic
- PC-TCP for DOS
- NetWare Lite, NetWare 2, 3, and 4. Netware 4.11 through 5.x supported the ISA and MCA cards natively but did not provide any configuration or link diagnostics utilities.
- ODI/VLM NetWare client for DOS. The DOS drivers came with configuration and link diagnostics utilities.
- SCO UNIX version 1.00.00.00
- UnixWare version 1.1
- NCR's documentation stated that drivers for Banyan Vines 5.05 were available on Banyan's BBS, but it is unclear if they ever materialized.

=== Volunteer-developed drivers ===
Linux has included support for ISA Classic WaveLAN cards since the 2.0.37 kernel, while full support for the PC card Classic WaveLAN cards came later. Status of support for MCA Classic Wavelan cards is unknown.

FreeBSD version 2.2.1-up and the Mach4 kernel have had native support for the ISA Classic WaveLAN cards for several years. OpenBSD and NetBSD do not natively support any of the Classic WaveLAN cards.

Several open-source projects, such as NdisWrapper and Project Evil, currently exist that allow the use of NDIS drivers via a "wrapper". This allows non-Windows OS' to utilize the near-universal nature of drivers written for the Windows platform to the benefit of other operating systems, such as Linux, FreeBSD, and ZETA.

== Examples ==
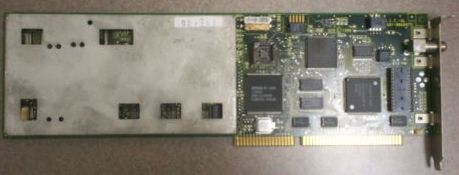
Full-size NCR ISA WaveLAN 915 MHz card

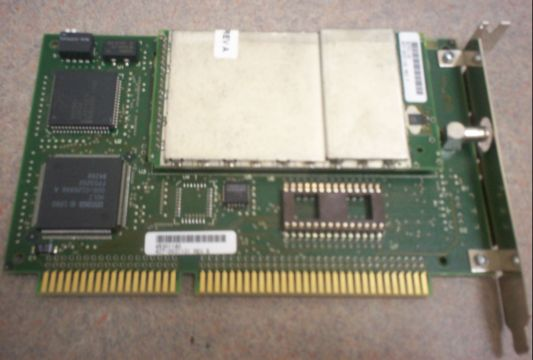
Half-size AT&T WaveLAN 915 MHz card

Classic WaveLAN technology was available for the MCA, ISA/EISA, and PCMCIA interfaces:

=== 915 MHz ===
- Full-length ISA card
  - F connector
  - RG-59/U antenna cable
  - NCR 008-0126998 HOLI (HOst Lan Interface) chip
  - NCR 008-0126999 Icarus or NCR 008-0127211 Daedalus chip
  - Intel N82586 PHY controller chip
  - IRQ, boot ROM, and boot ROM base address configured with a four-position DIP switch block at top of card
  - NCR part number 601-0068991
  - AT&T part number 3399-F170
- Half-length ISA card
  - SMB connector
  - NCR 008-0126998 HOLI chip
  - Intel N82586 PHY controller chip
  - IRQ, boot ROM, and boot ROM base address configured with a four-position DIP switch block at top of card
  - AT&T part number 3399-K602.
- Full-length MCA card
  - F connector
  - NCR 008-0127216 HOLI chip
  - NCR 008-0126999 Icarus chip
  - NCR 8-127000A socketed DES encryption chip
  - Intel N82586 PHY controller chip
  - MCA id number 6A14.
- PC card
  - Large EAM (External Antenna Module)
  - Intel i82593 PHY controller chip
  - AT&T part number 3399-K080
  - Compaq/DEC Roamabout part number: DEINA-AA.

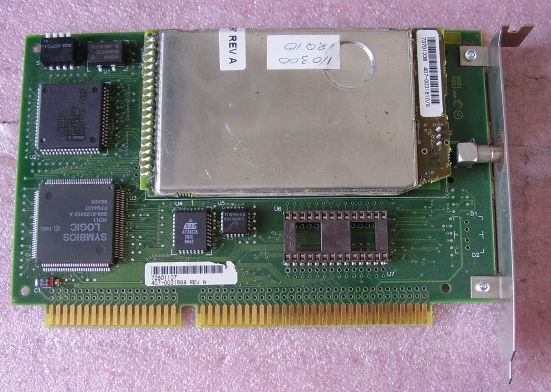
Half-size AT&T WaveLAN 2.4 GHz card

=== 2.4 GHz ===
- Full-length ISA card
  - Fixed frequency
  - IRQ, boot ROM, and boot ROM base address configured with a four-position DIP switch block at top of card
- Half-length ISA card
  - SMB connector
  - Selectable frequency
  - Symbios Logic 008-0126998 HOLI chip
  - Intel N82586 PHY controller chip
  - IRQ, boot ROM, and boot ROM base address configured with a four-position DIP switch block at top of card
  - AT&T part number 3399-K635.
- Full-length MCA card
  - SMB connector
  - NCR 008-0127216 HOLI chip
  - NCR 008-0127211 Daedalus chip
  - NCR 8-127000A socketed DES encryption chip
  - Intel N82586 PHY controller chip
  - AT&T part number 3399-K066
  - MCA id number 6A14.
- PC card - 2.4 GHz, selectable frequency, large EAM (External Antenna Module).
  - Intel N82593 PHY controller chip
  - AT&T part number: AT&T 3399-K624.
  - Lucent part number: LUC 3399-K644.
  - Compaq/DEC Roamabout part number: DEIRB-xx.

=== Options ===
- DES encryption chip. Part number 3399-K972.
- Boot ROM chip. Part number 3399-K973.
