= Flat IP =

IP network architecture

Flat IP is a network addressing scheme where each device is assigned a unique identifier within a non-hierarchical address space. Unlike hierarchical IP addressing methods, which rely on structured sub-networking, flat IP treats all devices as equal entities.

This approach is frequently used in cellular networks, particularly in LTE, due to its efficiency in managing device handovers between network cells. It enables each device to be directly accessed via its unique identifier, improving routing efficiency and reducing latency in mobile environments.

While flat IP can streamline network design for specific applications, it may present scalability challenges in large networks. The scheme lacks a structured hierarchy and requires a large pool of unique identifiers, which can reduce efficiency in large-scale networks compared to traditional IP models. However, flat IP remains a practical choice when simplicity and direct device access are prioritized.

== Flat IP architecture ==
Flat IP architecture is suited for various settings, including small businesses, home networks, mobile broadband. It facilitates streamlined network management, and establishes direct connections for real-time data applications.

=== Overview ===
Wireless operators adopt flat IP architecture to meet the growing need for real-time data applications delivered over mobile broadband networks. Unlike traditional hierarchical network designs, flat IP architecture relies upon a simplified, horizontal structure.

=== Benefits ===
Flat IP architectures can offer advantages such as:

1. Cost Efficiency: By reducing reliance on specialized network hardware, such as ATM switches and MPLS routers, flat IP networks utilize a simplified, single-level communication model. This lowers hardware and maintenance costs.
2. Improved Scalability and Flexibility: With the absence of hierarchical layers, the integration of new devices and services becomes easier. This is particularly beneficial for mobile network operators who must navigate dynamic and rapidly evolving technological environments.
3. Reduced Latency: Flat IP architectures minimize network layers and simplify packet processing, which is preferred for latency-sensitive applications, like Voice over IP (VoIP) and video streaming.

In mobile networks, centralized anchors often cause performance bottlenecks. Flat, distributed architectures resolve this by removing centralized components, improving scalability, flexibility, and latency.

=== Drawbacks ===
Flat IP architecture can present several challenges:

1. Lack of redundancy: Flat networks typically rely on a single switch or central point of failure, increasing the risk of network outages if that point fails.
2. Complex troubleshooting: With fewer hierarchical layers to help isolate issues, pinpointing the root cause of network problems can become time-consuming.
3. Increased security vulnerabilities: Flat networks are more susceptible to lateral attacks, where malware or unauthorized access can spread quickly between devices. This is due to the absence of traditional segmentation and network layers. In more hierarchical or segmented networks, features like NAT (Network Address Translation) can help by making devices "hidden" behind the gateway, thereby reducing accessibility from outside the network.

=== Use cases of flat IP architecture ===
Flat IP architecture is more suited for mobile networks. The following organizations use Flat IP:

1. 3rd Generation Partnership Project (3GPP) and 3GPP2: These organizations, responsible for developing global standards for mobile telecommunication systems, have integrated flat IP principles into their network design frameworks to promote more efficient and scalable mobile networks.
2. WiMAX Forum: Dedicated to promoting and certifying wireless broadband technologies, the WiMAX Forum was an early adopter of IP-centric mobile network architectures. It recognized the potential benefits of flat IP in enhancing network performance and flexibility.

=== Key considerations for mobile networks ===
In mobile networks, flat IP architecture integrates several essential components, including:

1. Advanced base stations: Modern base stations in flat IP networks are responsible for a range of functions, including radio control, header compression, encryption, call admission control, and policy enforcement. These stations typically use IP/Ethernet interfaces, which help streamline the network architecture and reduce latency.
2. Direct Tunnel Architecture: This configuration allows user data to bypass the Serving GPRS Support Node(SGSN) on the user plane, reducing both latency and complexity. Supported by leading vendors, Direct Tunnel Architecture enhances network performance. Notably, Nokia-Siemens' Internet High-Speed Packet Access (IHSPA) optimizes this by eliminating the Radio Network Controller (RNC) from the data path, further reducing latency.
3. WiMAX Access Services Network (ASN): WiMAX was the first standardized IP-centric mobile network architecture. Although HSPA and LTE networks have become the dominant technologies, many of the core principles from the WiMAX ASN continue to apply in modern mobile network deployments.

== See also ==
- 3GPP Long Term Evolution
- All IP
