= Aironet ARLAN =

ARLAN is a family of both proprietary non-802.11 and 802.11-compliant wireless networking technologies developed and marketed by Aironet Wireless Communications in the 1990s prior to Aironet's acquisition by Cisco Systems. Operating in the 900 MHz and 2.4 GHz ISM bands and offering a nominal 2.0 Mbit/s throughput, the non-802.11 DSSS products competed directly with NCR's WaveLAN technology. After acquisition, the ARLAN lineup was renamed to Cisco Aironet; the non-802.11 products were supported briefly then discontinued.

== Hardware ==
The ARLAN lineup consisted of several offerings:

=== 900 MHz DSSS non-802.11 ===
- Half-length ISA card, part number 655-900, RP-TNC connector. Cisco part number 200-001292.
- MCA card, part number 670-900, RP-TNC connector
- PC card, part number 690-900, large external antenna dongle
- 900 MHz access point, part number 630-900
- 900 MHz bridge, part number 640-900

=== 2.4 GHz DSSS non-802.11 ===
- Half-length ISA card, part number 655-2400 (later renamed to IC 2200), RP-TNC connector
- MCA card, part number 670-2400, RP-TNC connector
- PC card, part number 690-2400 (later renamed to PC 2200), large external antenna dongle
- 2.4 GHz access point, part number 630-2400
- 2.4 GHz bridge, part number 640-2400
- 2.4 GHz high-speed bridge, part number BR2040-EE

=== 2.4 GHz FHSS early 802.11 draft D5 compliant ===
- 2.4 GHz PC card, part number PC3000
- 2.4 GHz PC card, part number LM3000
- 2.4 GHz access point, part number AP3000

=== Official specifications ===
Realm	Type	Frequency	Channels	Modulation technique	Output power	Media access control	Security	Max data rate	Fallback rate
US and Canada	900 MHz	902-928 MHz	12	DSSS/DQPSK	450 mW	Modified CSMA/CA	24-bit network ID	860 kbit/s	215 kbit/s
Australia	900 MHz	915-928 MHz	5	DSSS/DQPSK	450 mW	Modified CSMA/CA	24-bit network ID	215 kbit/s	172 kbit/s
US, Canada, Europe	2.4 GHz	2.400-2.4835 GHz	5	DSSS/DQPSK	50 or 100 mW	Modified CSMA/CA	24-bit network ID	2 Mbit/s	1 Mbit/s
Japan	2.4 GHz	2.471-2.497 GHz	1	DSSS/DQPSK	50 or 100 mW	Modified CSMA/CA	24-bit network ID	2 Mbit/s	1 Mbit/s
US - BR2040-EE only	2.4 GHz	2.400-2.4835 GHz	5	DSSS/DQPSK	100 mW (4 W EIRP max)	Modified CSMA/CA	24-bit network ID	8 Mbit/s (2 pairs of non-interfering bridge frequency pairs)	1 Mbit/s
