= EXtreme Radio Service =

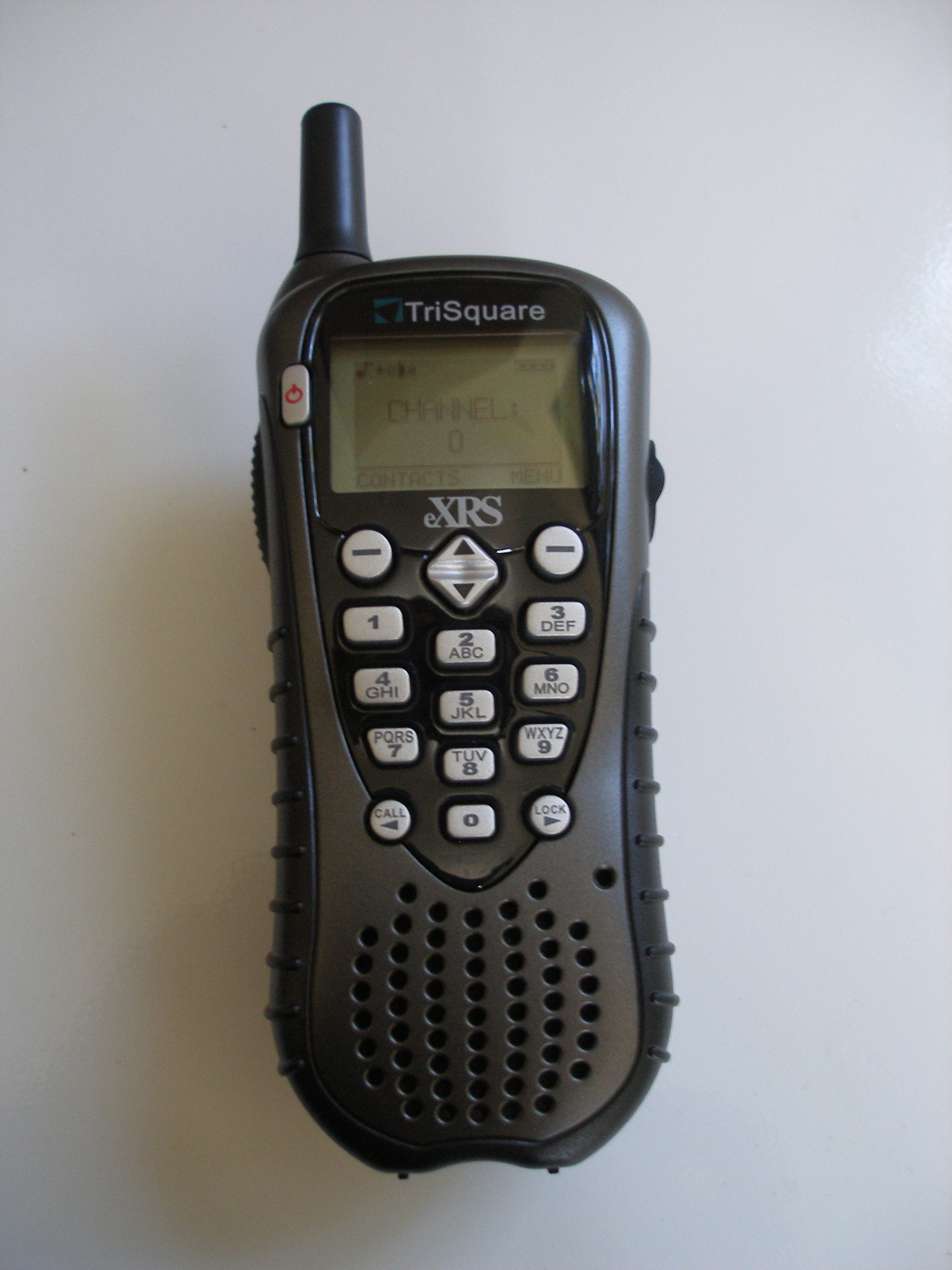
The TriSquare TSX300

eXtreme Radio Service (eXRS) is a proprietary personal communication technology marketed by TriSquare in the United States. The radios, which are similar to other walkie-talkies, use the Part 15 low power communication 915 MHz band, and employ frequency-hopping spread spectrum FM technology to attempt to address some of the perceived shortcomings of Family Radio Service (FRS) radios. Since the frequency in use is rapidly changed in a pattern defined by the channel number, transmissions cannot be monitored by commercially available radio scanners.

The radios hop on 50 actual frequencies from a pool of 700, giving ten billion unique frequency-hopping pattern combinations, known as channels Due to the extremely high number of available channels, users are unlikely to encounter others on the same channel, and malicious interference is unlikely unless the interferer knows the channel number being used. TriSquare claims that reliable communications can be maintained with up to 100,000 users in range of each other. This is in contrast to regular FRS or GMRS radios, which only permit 14 or 22 users to transmit simultaneously, one user per frequency, in range of each other, even with "privacy codes" or PL tones that simply prevent one user on a channel from hearing another on the same channel but do nothing to prevent interference.

The range of the eXRS radios is not explicitly stated, however, the manufacturer claims that it is equal to or greater than FRS and GMRS. Since the Earth is curved, the range of two way radios at these frequencies is limited to about 6 miles in good conditions, regardless of the advertised range.

By employing digital radio modes, the TSX300 is able to send SMS-type text messages directly to other radios, identify their transmissions with a user-defined name, and clone information and channels to other radios over the air. Due to the abundance of available channels, each radio can be given a "personal channel" which allows users both to contact individual radios privately and to contact multiple users on group channels.

No license is needed to operate the radios for personal or commercial use, and despite the name's similarity to the FRS allocation, the system is a proprietary design using a license free Part 15 band, rather than an official U.S. Federal Communications Commission (FCC) allocated service.

== Company status ==
On August 1, 2012, TriSquare vendor Buy Two-Way Radios posted that, "TriSquare is going out of business and its products will no longer be available."

No information is provided regarding other manufacturers picking up the proprietary technology.

TriSquare had been out of business for several years and no development of this technology has appeared.
