= VoLGA Forum =

Organisation of telecommunication vendors and operators

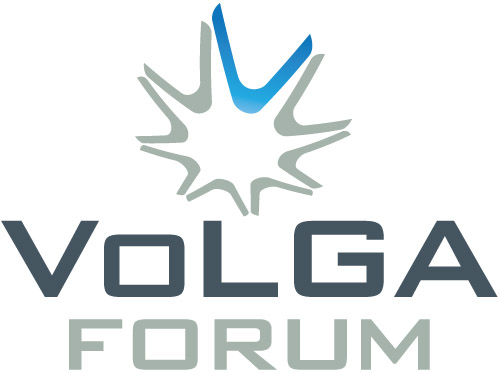
VoLGA Forum logo

VoLGA Forum was formed in March 2009 by a group of companies in the wireless industry in an effort to define a set of specifications for enabling delivery of voice services over 3GPP Long Term Evolution (LTE) access networks based on the current 3GPP Generic Access Network (GAN) standard.

VoLGA is an acronym for Voice over LTE via Generic Access.

The VoLGA Forum's mission is to promote the widespread adoption of VoLGA technology. The group wants to enable mobile operators to deliver voice and messaging services over upcoming LTE radio access networks using the same core networks they use today to support voice services on 2G/GSM and 3G/UMTS radio access networks.

The forum members include Alcatel-Lucent, Deutsche Telekom, Huawei, HTC Corporation, LG Electronics, Motorola, Nortel, Sonus Networks, Samsung, Starent Networks, and ZTE.

Swedish telecom equipment vendor Ericsson was originally a member of the VoLGA Forum, but revoked their membership in December 2009.

The group has developed and published a set of open specifications. These can be used by vendors and operators of wireless communications systems and applications to develop and deploy interoperable solutions.

In December 2009, Deutsche Telekom announced it had completed the world's first voice call over LTE.
