= Persoft =

Persoft, Inc.
- Type: Private
- Founded: August 1, 1982; 44 years ago in Madison, Wisconsin, United States
- Founders: Ed Harris; Robert Janoski
- Defunct: July 6, 1998; 28 years ago
- Fate: Acquired by Esker S.A.
- Number of employees: 90 (1987, peak)
- Website: persoft.com (archived)

Persoft, Inc., was an American computer company active from 1982 to 1999 and based in Madison, Wisconsin. Persoft primarily sold software for telecommunications and networking, its best known title being SmarTerm, a terminal emulator for the IBM PC. The company also dabbled in hardware and other types of software. In 1999, Persoft was acquired by Esker S.A., a French software company, for US$5 million.

== History ==
Persoft, Inc., was founded in Madison, Wisconsin, on August 1, 1982 by Ed Harris, a freelance computer consultant and software developer since 1964, and Robert Janoski, Harris's friend and colleague. Harris had been enrolled at the University of Wisconsin-Madison seeking a post-graduate degree in clinical psychology before founding Persoft with Janoski. The two formed the company after noticing the dearth of software for the IBM Personal Computer (IBM PC) relative to its rapid growth in the microcomputer market. Harris in particular saw a need for a terminal emulator for the IBM PC so that the computer could interface with the then-ubiquitous minicomputers and mainframes from DEC, Data General, and others.

The company was founded on a shoestring budget: US$4,000 in startup capital and two IBM PCs. Harris was named Persoft's CEO, while Janoski was its vice president. Harris's home basement served as Persoft's first headquarters; he and Janoski developed the company's first software and assembled the packages from there. Its first product was SmarTerm, a terminal emulator package. The company took out advertisements in PC Magazine, and together they earned $169,000 in fiscal year 1983. In summer 1986, Persoft introduced Referee, a utility for managing and preventing conflicts between terminate-and-stay-resident programs for IBM PC compatibles. Sales in Referee were strong, while growth in SmarTerm sales remained steady. By 1987 Persoft brought in $158,000 in profit on $4.2 million in sales and employed 90 workers from a 26,000-square-foot office in Madison. Janoski by this point had left due to differences in vision for the company's future; he was replaced by Tom Wolfe, a polymath who worked as a computer consultant, a non-practicing lawyer, a realtor, and a soil tester.

In 1987, the company acquired the rights to IZE, an information management software package, from Paul Kleinberger, Harris's first cousin. IZE is a combination outline processor, word processor, and text search utility that allows users to find keywords and phrases from potentially large volumes of text and present this information within a smaller document. IZE employs hyperlinks to connect the synthesized document to the files that it references and creates an index of referenced documents grouped by keywords. IZE received positive reviews in the technology press and attracted venture capital to Persoft. Frontenac Company of Chicago initially offered $2 million in exchange for 25 percent of ownership in Persoft, but Harris balked at Frontenac's contract, which stipulated, among other things, that Frontenac would have veto power in certain corporate decisions despite its minority ownership and that Persoft was required to post monthly financial reports punctually lest it risk a takeover of upper management. Harris walked away from the deal. After IZE received prominent mention in Newsweek in December 1987, Frontenac revisited its agreement, removing these unfavorable terms while promising the same amount of venture capital. Its agreement with Persoft was finalized in February 1988.

Following its investment in Persoft, Frontenac saw the reorganization of the company's management. In 1988, they hired Don J. Giacchetti to become Persoft's chief operating officer. The company's workforce retracted to 63 in 1990 after posting record sales of $6 million in 1989. In July 1990, Harris stepped down as CEO while renaming chairman of Persoft. He was replaced in his role as CEO by Giacchetti. In February 1991, Persoft spun off the division that developed IZE into an independent company, Retrieval Dynamics, Inc., with Harris named its head.

Also in February 1991, the company unveiled its first hardware product, Passage, which allowed IBM PCs and compatibles on Token Ring networks to access VAX hosts via the Local Area Transport protocol. It comprised a Token Ring ISA card, an Ethernet ISA card, and the Passage software, and retailed for nearly $6,000 for a 20-user license or $10,000 for a 50-user license. Later in 1991, the company introduced its second hardware product, the Intersect Remote Bridge, an early implementation of NCR's WaveLAN, a wireless networking protocol. The Intersect Remote Bridge allowed nearby local area networks to connect to each other wirelessly via bridge computers installed with Persoft's card.

In late 1996, Persoft introduced Persona Intranet, a family of Java applets that allowed corporate users to access AS/400 or VAX hosts via a web browser rather than client software installed on each workstation. Persona was Persoft's last new product line before it was acquired by Esker S.A., a French software company, for US$5 million in a stock swap on July 6, 1999. Esker continued maintaining SmarTerm and Persona for some years after.
