= Mobile VoIP =

Extension of voice over IP network

Mobile VoIP or simply mVoIP is an extension of mobility to a voice over IP network. Two types of communication are generally supported: cordless telephones using DECT or PCS protocols for short range or campus communications where all base stations are linked into the same LAN, and wider area communications using 3G, 4G, or 5G protocols.

There are several methodologies that allow a mobile handset to be integrated into a VoIP network. One implementation turns the mobile device into a standard SIP client, which then uses a data network to send and receive SIP messaging, and to send and receive RTP for the voice path. This methodology of turning a mobile handset into a standard SIP client requires that the mobile handset support, at minimum, high speed IP communications. In this application, standard VoIP protocols (typically SIP) are used over any broadband IP-capable wireless network connection such as EVDO rev A (which is symmetrical high speed — both high speed up and down), HSPA, Wi-Fi or WiMAX.

Another implementation of mobile integration uses a soft-switch like gateway to bridge SIP and RTP into the mobile network's SS7 infrastructure. In this implementation, the mobile handset continues to operate as it always has (as a GSM or CDMA based device), but now it can be controlled by a SIP application server which can now provide advanced SIP-based services to it. Several vendors offer this kind of capability today.

Mobile VoIP will require a compromise between economy and mobility. For example, voice over Wi-Fi offers potentially free service but is only available within the coverage area of a single Wi-Fi access point. Cordless protocols offer excellent voice support and even support base station handoff, but require all base stations to communicate on one LAN as the handoff protocol is generally not supported by carriers or most devices.

High speed services from mobile operators using EVDO rev A or HSPA may have better audio quality and capabilities for metropolitan-wide coverage including fast handoffs among mobile base stations, yet may cost more than Wi-Fi-based VoIP services.

As device manufacturers exploited more powerful processors and less costly memory, smartphones became capable of sending and receiving email, browsing the web (albeit at low rates) and allowing a user to watch TV. Mobile VoIP users were predicted to exceed 100 million by 2012 and InStat projects 288 million subscribers by 2013.

The mobile operator industry business model conflicts with the expectations of Internet users that access is free and fast without extra charges for visiting specific sites, however far away they may be hosted. Because of this, most innovations in mobile VoIP will likely come from campus and corporate networks, open source projects like Asterisk, and applications where the benefits are high enough to justify expensive experiments (medical, military, etc.).

== Technologies ==
Mobile VoIP, like all VoIP, relies on SIP — the standard used by most VoIP services, and now being implemented on mobile handsets and smartphones and an increasing number of cordless phones.

UMA — the Unlicensed Mobile Access Generic Access Network allows VoIP to run over the GSM cellular backbone.

When moving between IP-based networks, as is typically the case for outdoor applications, two other protocols are required:

- IEEE 802.21 handoff, permitting one network to do call setup and initial traffic, handing off to another when the first is about to fall out of range - the underlying network need not be IP-based, but typically the IP stream is guaranteed a certain quality of service (QoS) during the handoff process
- IEEE 802.11u call initiation when the initial contact with a network is not one that the user has subscribed to or been in contact with before.

For indoor or campus (cordless phone equivalent) use, the IEEE P1905 protocol establishes QoS guarantees for home area networks: Wi-Fi, Bluetooth, 3G, 4G, 5G and wired backbones using AC powerline networking/HomePlug/IEEE P1901, Ethernet and Power over Ethernet/IEEE 802.3af/IEEE 802.3at, MoCA and G.hn. In combination with IEEE 802.21, P1905 permits a call to be initiated on a wired phone and transferred to a wireless one and then resumed on a wired one, perhaps with additional capabilities such as videoconferencing in another room. In this case the use of mobile VoIP enables a continuous conversation that originates, and ends with, a wired terminal device.

An older technology, PCS base station handoff, specifies equivalent capabilities for cordless phones based on 800, 900, 2.4, 5.8 and DECT. While these capabilities were not widely implemented, they did provide the functional specification for handoff for modern IP-based telephony. A phone can in theory offer both PCS cordless and mobile VoIP and permit calls to be handed off from traditional cordless to cell and back to cordless if both the PCS and UMA/SIP/IEEE standards suites are implemented. Some specialized long distance cordless vendors like Senao attempted this but it has not generally caught on. A more popular approach has been full-spectrum handsets that can communicate with any wireless network including mobile VoIP, DECT and satellite phone networks, but which have limited handoff capabilities between networks. The intent of IEEE 802.21 and IEEE 802.11u is that they be added to such phones running iPhone, QNX, Android or other smartphone operating systems, yielding a phone that is capable of communicating with literally any digital network and maintaining a continuous call at high reliability at a low access cost.

Most VoIP vendors implement proprietary technologies that permit such handoff between equipment of their own manufacture, e.g. the Viera system from Panasonic. Typically providing mobility costs more, e.g., the Panasonic VoIP cordless phone system (KX-TGP) costs approximately three times more than its popular DECT PSTN equivalent (KX-TGA). Some companies, including Cisco, offer adapters for analog/DECT phones as alternatives to their expensive cordless.

== Industry history ==
=== 2005 ===
Early experiments proved that VoIP was practical and could be routed by Asterisk even on low-end routers like the Linksys WRT54G series. Suggesting a mesh network (e.g. WDS) composed of such cheap devices could similarly support roaming mobile VoIP phones. These experiments, and others for IP roaming such as Sputnik, were the beginning of the 5G protocol suite including IEEE 802.21 and IEEE 802.11u. At this time, some mobile operators attempted to restrict IP tethering and VoIP use on their networks, often by deliberately introducing high latency into data communications making it useless for voice traffic.

=== 2006 ===
In the summer of 2006, a SIP (Session Initiation Protocol) stack was introduced and a VoIP client in Nokia E-series dual-mode Wi-Fi handsets (Nokia E60, Nokia E61, Nokia E70). The SIP stack and client have since been introduced in many more E and N-series dual-mode Wi-Fi handsets, most notably the Nokia N95 which has been very popular in Europe. Various services use these handsets.

=== 2008 ===
In spring 2008 Nokia introduced a built in SIP VoIP client for the very first time to the mass market device (Nokia 6300i) running Series 40 operating system. Later that year (Nokia 6260 Slide was introduced introducing slightly updated SIP VoIP client. Nokia maintains a list of all phones that have an integrated VoIP client in Forum Nokia.

Aircell's battle with some companies allowing VoIP calls on flights is another example of the growing conflict of interest between incumbent operators and new VoIP operators.

=== 2009 ===
By January 2009 OpenWRT was capable of supporting mobile VoIP applications via Asterisk running on a USB stick. As OpenWRT runs on most Wi-Fi routers, this radically expanded the potential reach of mobile VoIP applications. Users reported acceptable results using G.729 codecs and connections to a "main NAT/Firewall router with a NAT=yes and canreinvite=no.. As such, my asterisk will stay in the audio path and can't redirect the RTP media stream (audio) to go directly from the caller to the callee." Minor problems were also reported: "Whenever there is an I/O activities ... i.e. reading the Flash space (mtdblockd process), this will create some hick-ups (or temporarily losing audio signals)." The combination of OpenWRT and Asterisk is intended as an open source replacement for proprietary PBXes.

The company xG Technology, Inc. had a mobile VoIP and data system operating in the license-free ISM 900 MHz band (902 MHz – 928 MHz). xMax is an end-to-end Internet Protocol (IP) system infrastructure that is currently deployed in Fort Lauderdale, Florida.

=== 2010 ===
In January 2010 Apple Inc. updated the iPhone developer SDK to allow VoIP over cellular networks. iCall became the first App Store app to enable VoIP on the iPhone and iPod Touch over cellular 3G networks.

In second half of 2010 Nokia introduced three new dualmode Wi-Fi capable Series40 handsets (Nokia X3-02, Nokia C3-01 and, Nokia C3-01 Gold Edition) with integrated SIP VoIP that supports HD voice (AMR-WB).

=== 2011 ===
The mainstreaming of VoIP in the small business market led to the introduction of more devices extending VoIP to business cordless users.

Panasonic introduced the KX-TGP base station supporting up to 6 cordless handsets , essentially a VoIP complement to its popular KX-TGA analogue phones which likewise support up to 4 cordless handsets. However, unlike the analogue system which supports only four handsets in one "conference" on one line, the TGP supports 3 simultaneous network conversations and up to 8 SIP registrations (e.g. up to 8 DID lines or extensions), as well as an Ethernet pass-through port to hook up computers on the same drop. In its publicity Panasonic specifically mentions Digium (founded by the creator of Asterisk), its product Switchvox and Asterisk itself.

Several router manufacturers including TRENDnet and Netgear released sub-$300 Power over Ethernet switches aimed at the VoIP market. Unlike industry standard switches that provided the full 30 watts of power per port, these allowed under 50 watts of power to all four PoE ports combined. This made them entirely suitable for VoIP and other low-power use (Motorola Canopy or security camera or Wi-Fi APs) typical of a SOHO application, or supporting an 8-line PBX, especially in combination with a multi-line handset such as the Panasonic KX-TGP (which does not require a powered port).

Accordingly, by the end of 2011, for under US$3000 it was possible to build an office VoIP system based entirely on cordless technology capable of several hundred metres reach and on Power over Ethernet dedicated wired phones, with up to 8 DID lines and 3 simultaneous conversations per base station, with 24 handsets each capable of communicating on any subset of the 8 lines, plus an unlimited number of softphones running on computers and laptops and smartphones. This compared favourably to proprietary PBX technology especially as VoIP cordless was far cheaper than PBX cordless.

Cisco also released the SPA112, an Analogue Telephone Adapter (ATA) to connect one or two standard RJ-11 telephones to an Ethernet, in November 2011, retailing for under US$50. This was a competitive response to major cordless vendors such as Panasonic moving into the business VoIP cordless market Cisco had long dominated, as it suppressed the market for the cordless makers' native VoIP phones and permitted Cisco to argue the business case to spend more on switches and less on terminal devices. However, this solution would not permit the analogue phones to access every line of a multi-line PBX, only one hardwired line per phone.

As of late 2011, most cellular data networks were still extremely high latency and effectively useless for VoIP. IP-only providers such as Voipstream had begun to serve urban areas, and alternative approaches such as OpenBTS (open source GSM) were competing with mobile VoIP.

In November 2011, Nokia introduced Nokia Asha 303 with integrated SIP VoIP client that can operate both over Wi-Fi and 3G networks.

=== 2012 ===
In February 2012, Nokia introduced Nokia Asha 302 and in June Nokia Asha 311 both with integrated SIP VoIP client that can operate both over Wi-Fi and 3G networks.

=== 2014 ===
By September 2014, mobile-enabled VoIP (VoLTE) had been launched by T-Mobile US across its national network and by AT&T Mobility in a few markets. Verizon plans to launch its VoLTE service "in the coming weeks," according to media reports in August, 2014. It provides HD Voice, which increases mobile voice quality, and permits optional use of video calling and front and rear-facing cameras. In the future, Verizon's VoLTE is expected to also permit video sharing, chat functionality, and file transfers.

== See also ==
- Comparison of VoIP software
- Fixed mobile convergence
- Forfone, network access through Wi-Fi, LTE, 3G or UMTS
- IP Multimedia Subsystem (IMS), a set of specifications from 3GPP for delivering VoIP and other IP multimedia to cellular users
- List of SIP software
- List of VoIP companies
- Mobile communications over IP
- Voice over IP
- Voice over LTE
- VoWLAN — VoIP over a Wi-Fi network
- VoLGA Forum — Voice over LTE via Generic Access
