= Mobile communications over IP =

MoIP, or mobile communications over Internet Protocol, is the mobilization of peer-to-peer communications including chat and talk using Internet Protocol via standard mobile communications applications including 3G, GPRS, Wi-Fi as well as WiMax. Unlike mobile VoIP, MoIP is not a VoIP program made accessible from mobile phones or a switchboard application using VoIP in the background. It is rather a native mobile application on users’ handsets and used to conduct talk and chat over the internet connection as its primary channel.

== How MoIP (mobile) works ==
MoIP applications typically work without any proprietary hardware, are enhanced with real-time contact availability (presence) and save the users money by utilizing free Wi-Fi internet access or fixed internet data plans instead of GSM (talk) minutes. They are completely mobile-centric, designed and optimized specifically for mobile-handsets environment rather than the PC.
