= Aironet =

Maker of wireless networking equipment

Aironet Wireless Communications, Inc.
- Type: Private
- Industry: Computer networking
- Founded: 1986; 40 years ago
- Fate: Acquired by Cisco Systems
- Headquarters: United States
- Website: aironet.com at the Wayback Machine (archived 1996-10-29)

Aironet Wireless Communications, Inc. was an American manufacturer of wireless networking equipment. It was started by ex-Marconi Wireless employees in 1986 as Telesystems SLW in Canada, right after the United States Federal Communications Commission opened up the ISM bands for spread spectrum license-free use. Telxon acquired Telesystems SLW in 1992, and Aironet Wireless Communications was spun off from Telxon's RF Division in 1994. Cisco Systems acquired Aironet in 1999 and kept it as a subsidiary for several years.

One of its pre-acquisition direct competitors was NCR and its successors (AT&T and Lucent), who sold the WaveLAN wireless networking technology.

== Products ==
=== Pre-acquisition ===
- ARLAN 900 MHz proprietary wireless networking
- ARLAN 2.4 GHz proprietary wireless networking

=== Post-acquisition ===
- Aironet AP340 - 2.4 GHz 802.11b - Access point (VxWorks Based OS)
- Aironet AP350 - 2.4 GHz 802.11b - Access point (VxWorks Based OS)
- Aironet BR350 - 2.4 GHz 802.11b - Wireless bridge (VxWorks Based OS)
- Aironet 700W Series
  - Simultaneous dual band radio, 802.11n based, wall-plate-mountable, BandSelect, VideoStream, 4 Gigabit Ethernet ports, one PoE port, requires a controller.
- Aironet 1000 Series - 802.11 a/b/g dual-band- Light weigh only (from the Airespace acquisition)
- Aironet 1100 Series (2009)
  - 1120 - 802.11g (2.4 GHz only)
  - 1130 - 802.11g (2.4 GHz) and 802.11a (5 Ghz)
  - 1140 - 802.11n (2.4 GHz only), PoE, single port, ClientLink beam forming technology.
    - End of Life: October 1, 2013.
    - End of Software Updates: October 1, 2014.
- Aironet 1700 Series
- Aironet 1850 Series
- Aironet 1200 Series
  - 1210/1220/1230 - 2.4 GHz 802.11b with optional 802.11a (5 GHz) "flappy" antenna module.
  - 1240
  - 1250
  - 1250
- Aironet 1300 Outdoor Access Point/Bridge
- Aironet 2600 Series
- Aironet 2700 Series
- Aironet 2800 Series
- Aironet 3500 Series
- Aironet 3600 Series
- Aironet 3700 Series
- Aironet 3800 Series
- Aironet 4800 Series

=== Aironet-compatible Cisco wireless controllers ===
- Cisco 8540 Wireless LAN Controller
- Cisco 5520 Wireless LAN Controller
- Cisco 3504 Wireless LAN Controller
- Cisco 2500 Wireless LAN Controller
- Cisco Virtual Wireless Controller.

== See also ==
- List of acquisitions by Cisco
