= Modem over VoIP =

Use of voice over IP to carry modem signals

Modem over VoIP (sometimes abbreviated as MoIP) is the use of voice over IP (VoIP) to carry analog modem signals, which are then in turn used to carry a two-way digital data link.

== G.711 passthrough ==
Since most VoIP codecs are designed only to carry speech signals, successful modem-over-VoIP operation generally requires the use of G.711 coding on the VoIP audio link, emulating the channel capabilities of a digital PSTN connection. ITU-T V.152 describes one way of implementing G.711 passthrough.

G.711 uses 8 bits per sample, either μ-law and A-law encoded, at a sample rate of 8 kHz, and signals carried over G.711 have historically been associated with a maximum practical modem speed of 56 kbps, based on the ITU-T V.92 standard. This use of G.711 coding is sometimes called 'fax pass-through' as it enables analog fax transmission (which also uses a modem connection) over VoIP.

G.711 modem-over-VoIP communication can be useful for connecting an Internet-connected computer to a dial-up system that only has modem connectivity over the PSTN. It can also be performed end-to-end by hobbyists for the purposes of amusement.

== V.150.1 ==
An alternative to G.711 passthrough is the use of ITU-T V.150.1, also known as Modem over IP, which demodulates and remodulates modem data at gateways, forwarding the data over IP between them. This has the advantage that it can also handle some of the signalling aspects of modem connections.

== See also ==
- ITU-T T.38, also known as Fax over IP, which encapsulates T.30 fax data directly over IP

Template:Telecomm-infrastructure-stub
