= Vislink Technologies =

American technology company

Vislink Technologies, Inc.
- Formerly: xG Technology, Inc.
- Type: Public
- Traded as: Nasdaq: VISL
- Industry: Wireless Communications
- Founded: 2002
- Headquarters: Mount Olive, New Jersey, U.S.
- Key people: Carleton M. Miller (CEO) (January 2020 - present)
- Revenue: ▲$28.9 Million (FY 2019)
- Website: www.vislink.com

Vislink Technologies, Inc. is an American technology company that specializes in the collection, delivery, management and distribution of high quality live video and data. Founded as xG Technology in Sarasota, Florida in 2002, the company had acquired both Vislink and Integrated Microwave Technologies by 2017. In February 2019, xG Technology formally changed its name to Vislink Technologies. The company is headquartered in Hackettstown, New Jersey and has regional offices in Billerica, Massachusetts and Anaheim, California, as well as global offices in the United Kingdom, Dubai and Singapore. Vislink is a publicly traded company listed on the NASDAQ Capital Market.

Vislink has created a portfolio of intellectual property that includes cognitive radio, interference mitigation and self-organizing wireless network technologies for mobile services using licensed or unlicensed radio spectrum. In November 2020, Vislink was named a Deloitte Technology Fast 500 winner, and was among the fastest-growing North American technology companies.

In February 2021, the company announced its "Connected Edge" strategy and began a pivot towards edge computing aimed at further expansion into sporting events, military contracts, satellite communications and first responder networks.

== XMax ==
xMax developed by xG Technology, Inc. is a cognitive radio based mobile VoIP and computer networking system operating in the license-free ISM 900 MHz band (902–928 MHz). xMax is built upon an end-to-end Internet Protocol (IP) system infrastructure that includes a line of base stations, mobile switching centers (MSC), handsets and modems.

xMax currently operates in the unlicensed 900 MHz ISM band, although it has been designed to be programmed for operation in any licensed or unlicensed frequency from approximately 300 MHz to 3 GHz.

The xMax system is designed to allow mobile operators to utilize free, unlicensed 902–928 MHz spectrum, which is available in most of the Americas. Unlicensed spectrum is an affordable alternative to licensed spectrum – such as what broadcasters use to transmit their signals. Any company or consumer can use unlicensed spectrum simply by following well-known rules.

=== Performance claims ===
A press report was published in 2005 quoting inventor Joseph Bobier. The technology was said to compete with WiMax, but details were initially not disclosed. By 2006, the company announced it had "completed" the technology after six years of development. In 2009, a blogger wrote that he witnessed a xMax mobile VoIP pilot network operated by the company in Fort Lauderdale: "xMax worked well and is real. When you realize that this company may have found a way to take a frequency riddled with wireless garbage and turn it into a fully functioning wireless voice and data network you start to see how much of a game changer this could be for the wireless industry."

- Antenna: commercially off the shelf antenna
- Range: typically 2–5 miles depending upon tower height and terrain.
- Data rate: 18 Mbit/s per basestation
- Spectrum used: Unlicensed 902–928 MHz band
- Interference: Ability to accept interference found on 902–928 MHz band
- Power: Less than 1 W

From 2007 through 2009, Phil Karn published some analysis of the technology claims.

== See also ==
- Cognitive radio
- Software-defined radio
- Radio frequency
- Radio spectrum
- Mobile VoIP
