= LTE (telecommunication) =

Mobile broadband communication standard

In telecommunications, Long Term Evolution (LTE) is a standard for wireless broadband communication for cellular mobile devices and data terminals. It is considered to be a "transitional" 4G technology, and is therefore also referred to as 3.95G as a step above 3G.

LTE is based on the 2G GSM/EDGE and 3G UMTS/HSPA standards. It improves on those standards' capacity and speed by using a different radio interface and core network improvements. LTE became the de facto industry standard upgrade path for carriers with both GSM/UMTS networks and CDMA2000 networks. LTE has been succeeded by LTE Advanced, which is officially defined as a "true" 4G technology and also named "LTE+". In the 2020s, LTE and LTE Advanced networks are being supplemented and replaced with 5G NR.

== Terminology ==
The standard is developed by the 3GPP (3rd Generation Partnership Project) and is specified in its Release 8 document series, with minor enhancements described in Release 9. LTE is also called 3.95G and has been marketed as 4G LTE and Advanced 4G; but the original version did not meet the technical criteria of a 4G wireless service, as specified in the 3GPP Release 8 and 9 document series for LTE Advanced. The requirements were set forth by the ITU-R organisation in the IMT Advanced specification; but, because of market pressure and the significant advances that WiMAX, Evolved High Speed Packet Access, and LTE bring to the original 3G technologies, ITU-R later decided that LTE and the aforementioned technologies can be called 4G technologies. The LTE Advanced standard formally satisfies the ITU-R requirements for being considered IMT-Advanced. To differentiate LTE Advanced and WiMAX-Advanced from earlier 4G technologies, ITU defined them in January 2012 as "True 4G".

== Overview ==
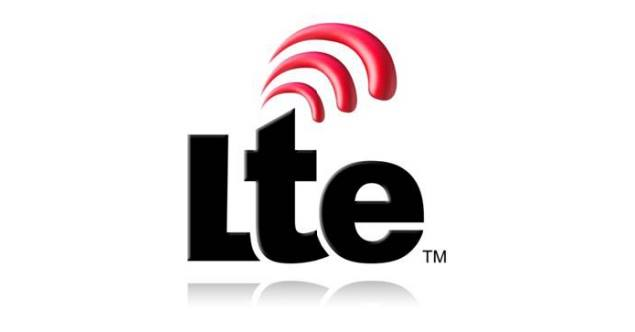
3GPP logo of LTE

An Android phone showing LTE connection

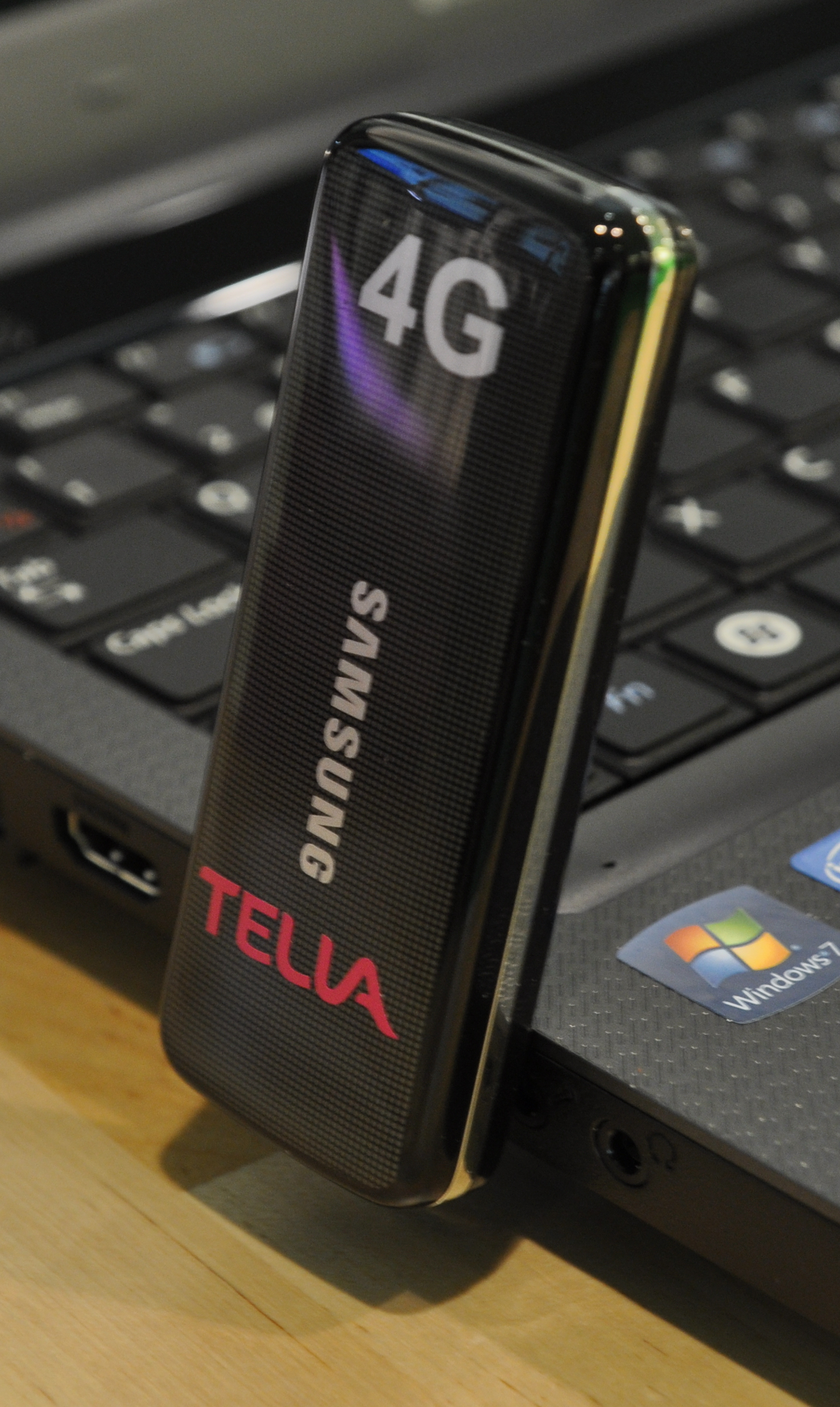
LTE modem

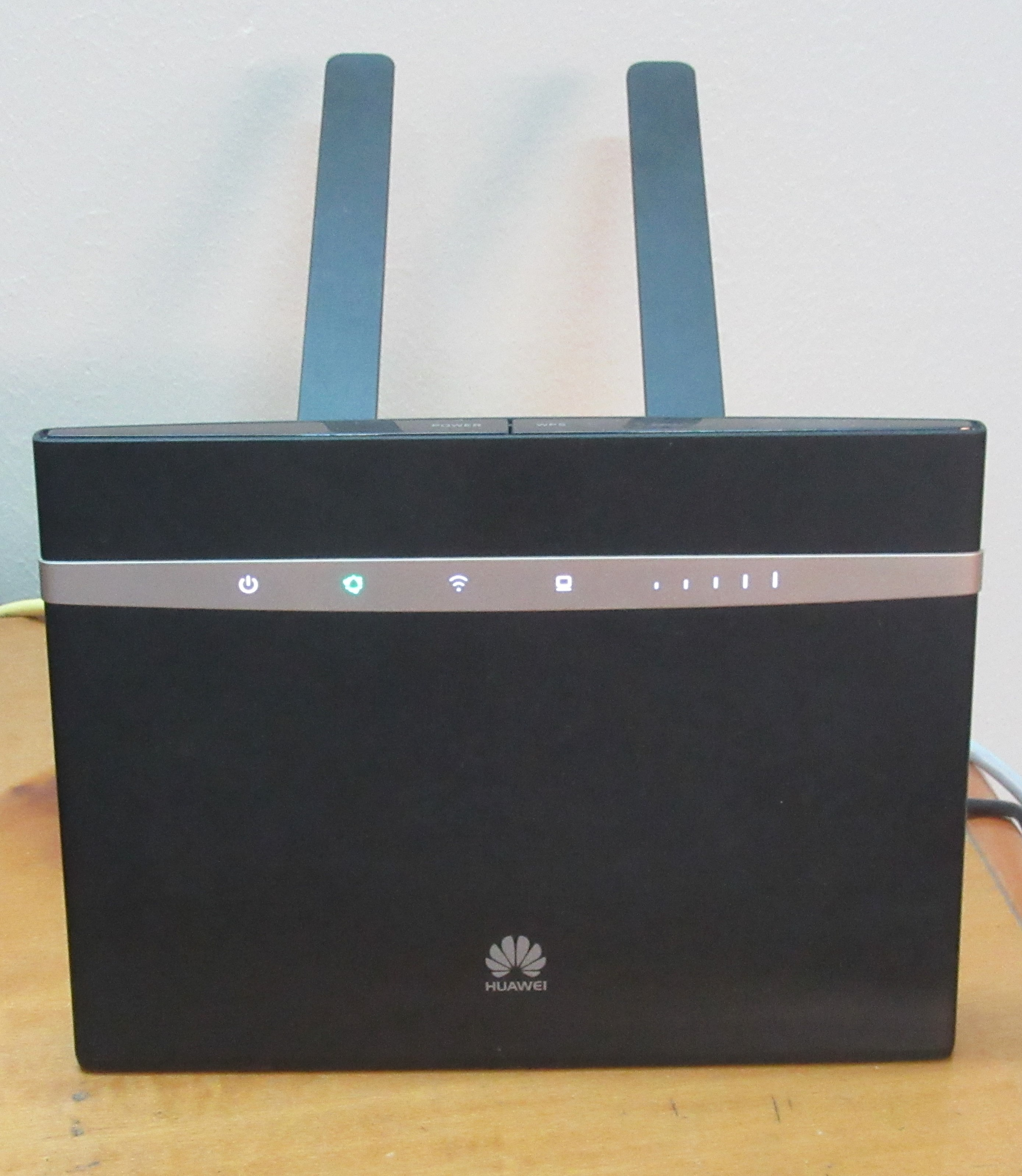
4G+ modem

LTE and VoLTE logos on a Samsung Galaxy S21+ running One UI 6.1

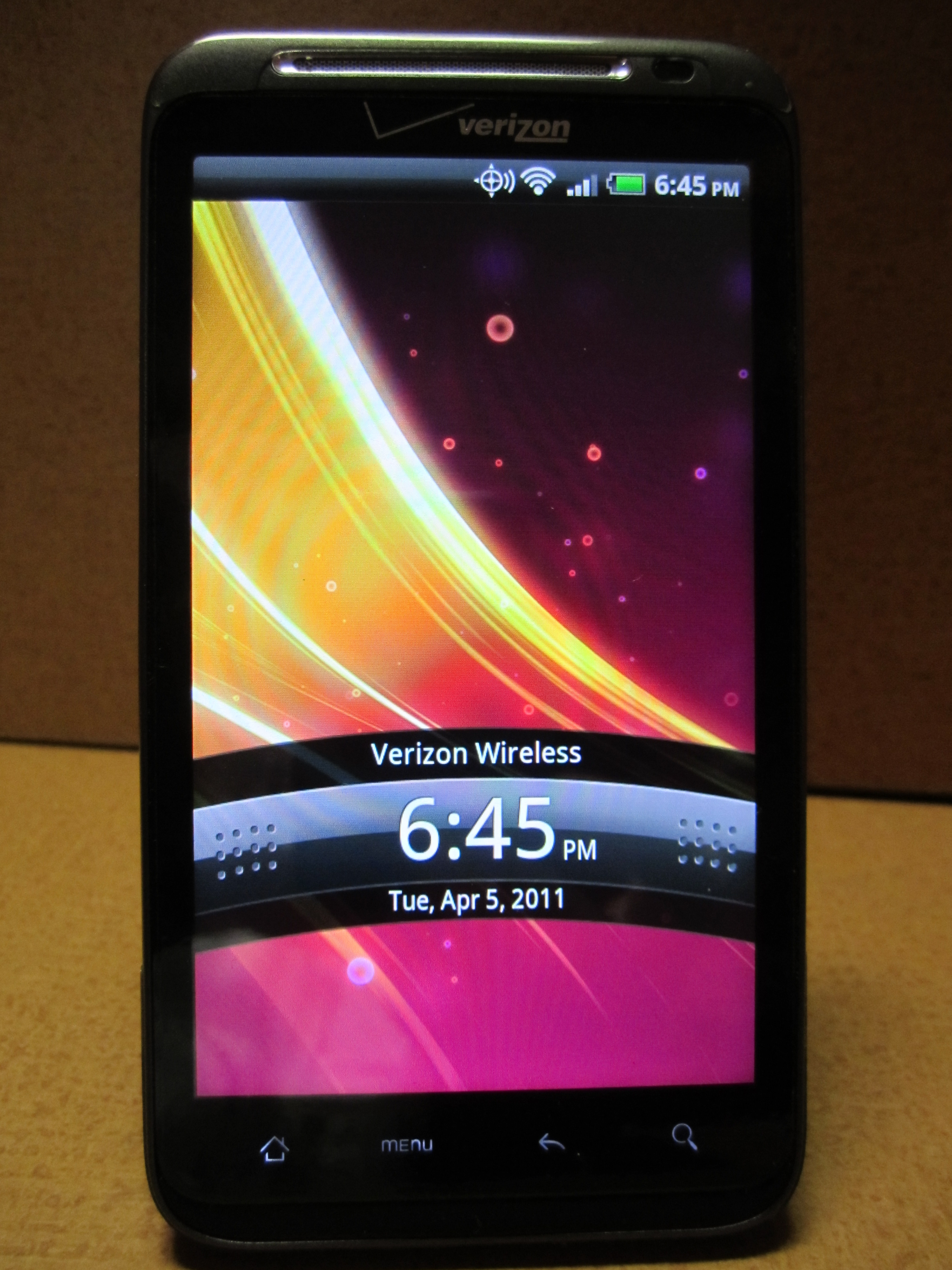
HTC ThunderBolt, the second commercially available LTE smartphone

LTE stands for Long Term Evolution and is a registered trademark owned by ETSI (European Telecommunications Standards Institute) for the wireless data communications technology and development of the GSM/UMTS standards. However, other nations and companies do play an active role in the LTE project. The goal of LTE was to increase the capacity and speed of wireless data networks using new DSP (digital signal processing) techniques and modulations that were developed around the turn of the millennium. A further goal was the redesign and simplification of the network architecture to an IP-based system with significantly reduced transfer latency compared with the 3G architecture. The LTE wireless interface is incompatible with 2G and 3G networks, so it must be operated on a separate radio spectrum.

The idea of LTE was first proposed in 1998, with the use of the COFDM radio access technique to replace the CDMA and studying its Terrestrial use in the L band at 1428 MHz (TE) In 2004 by Japan's NTT Docomo, with studies on the standard officially commenced in 2005. In May 2007, the LTE/SAE Trial Initiative (LSTI) alliance was founded as a global collaboration between vendors and operators with the goal of verifying and promoting the new standard to ensure the global introduction of the technology as quickly as possible.

The LTE standard was finalized in December 2008, and the first publicly available LTE service was launched by TeliaSonera in Oslo and Stockholm on December 14, 2009, as a data connection with a USB modem. The LTE services were launched by major North American carriers as well, with the Samsung SCH-r900 being the world's first LTE Mobile phone starting on September 21, 2010, and Samsung Galaxy Indulge being the world's first LTE smartphone starting on February 10, 2011, both offered by MetroPCS, and the HTC ThunderBolt offered by Verizon starting on March 17 being the second LTE smartphone to be sold commercially. In Canada, Rogers Wireless was the first to launch LTE network on July 7, 2011, offering the Sierra Wireless AirCard 313U USB mobile broadband modem, known as the "LTE Rocket stick" then followed closely by mobile devices from both HTC and Samsung. Initially, CDMA operators planned to upgrade to rival standards called UMB and WiMAX, but major CDMA operators (such as Verizon, Sprint and MetroPCS in the United States, Bell and Telus in Canada, au by KDDI in Japan, SK Telecom in South Korea and China Telecom/China Unicom in China) have announced instead they intend to migrate to LTE. The next version of LTE is LTE Advanced, which was standardized in March 2011. Services commenced in 2013. Additional evolution known as LTE Advanced Pro was approved in 2015.

The LTE specification provides downlink peak rates of 300 Mbit/s, uplink peak rates of 75 Mbit/s, and QoS provisions permitting a transfer latency of less than 5 ms in the radio access network. LTE has the ability to manage fast-moving mobiles and supports multicast and broadcast streams. LTE supports scalable carrier bandwidths, from 1.4 MHz to 20 MHz and supports both frequency division duplexing (FDD) and time-division duplexing (TDD). The IP-based network architecture, called the Evolved Packet Core (EPC) designed to replace the GPRS Core Network, supports seamless handovers for both voice and data to cell towers with older network technology such as GSM, UMTS and CDMA2000. The simpler architecture results in lower operating costs (for example, each E-UTRA cell will support up to four times the data and voice capacity supported by HSPA).

Because LTE frequencies and bands differ from country to country, only multi-band phones can use LTE in all countries where it is supported.

== History ==
=== 3GPP standard development timeline ===
Cellular network standards and generation timeline

- In 2004, NTT Docomo of Japan proposes LTE as the international standard.
- In September 2006, Siemens Networks (later Nokia Networks) showed in collaboration with Nomor Research the first live emulation of an LTE network to the media and investors. As live applications, two users streaming an HDTV video in the downlink and playing an interactive game in the uplink have been demonstrated.
- In February 2007, Ericsson demonstrated for the first time in the world, LTE with bit rates up to 144 Mbit/s
- In September 2007, NTT Docomo demonstrated LTE data rates of 200 Mbit/s with power level below 100 mW during the test.
- In November 2007, Infineon presented the world's first RF transceiver named SMARTi LTE, supporting LTE functionality in a single-chip RF silicon processed in CMOS
- In early 2008, LTE test equipment began shipping from several vendors and at the Mobile World Congress 2008 in Barcelona, Ericsson demonstrated the world's first end-to-end mobile call enabled by LTE on a small handheld device. Motorola demonstrated an LTE RAN (Radio Access Network) standard compliant eNodeB and LTE chipset at the same event.
- At the February 2008 Mobile World Congress:
  - Motorola demonstrated how LTE can accelerate the delivery of personal media experience with HD video demo streaming, HD video blogging, online gaming, and VoIP over LTE running a RAN standard-compliant LTE network & LTE chipset.
  - Ericsson EMP (later ST-Ericsson) demonstrated the world's first end-to-end LTE call on handheld Ericsson demonstrated LTE FDD and TDD mode on the same base station platform.
  - Freescale Semiconductor demonstrated streaming HD video with peak data rates of 96 Mbit/s downlink and 86 Mbit/s uplink.
  - NXP Semiconductors (later part of ST-Ericsson) demonstrated a multi-mode LTE modem as the basis for a software-defined radio system for use in cellphones.
  - picoChip and Mimoon demonstrated a base station reference design. This runs on a common hardware platform (multi-mode / software-defined radio) with their WiMAX architecture.
- In April 2008, Motorola demonstrated the first EV-DO to LTE hand-off handling over streaming a video from LTE to a commercial EV-DO network and back to LTE.
- In April 2008, LG Electronics and Nortel demonstrated LTE data rates of 50 Mbit/s while travelling at 110 km/h (68 mph).
- In November 2008, Motorola demonstrated industry first over-the-air LTE session in 700 MHz spectrum.
- Researchers at Nokia Siemens Networks and Heinrich Hertz Institut have demonstrated LTE with 100 Mbit/s Uplink transfer speeds.
- At the February 2009 Mobile World Congress:
  - Infineon demonstrated a single-chip 65 nm CMOS RF transceiver providing 2G/3G/LTE functionality
  - Launch of ng Connect program, a multi-industry consortium founded by Alcatel-Lucent to identify and develop wireless broadband applications.
  - Motorola provided LTE drive tour on the streets of Barcelona to demonstrate LTE system performance in a real-life metropolitan RF environment
- In July 2009, Nujira demonstrated efficiencies of more than 60% for an 880 MHz LTE Power Amplifier
- In August 2009, Nortel and LG Electronics demonstrated the first successful handoff between CDMA and LTE networks in a standards-compliant manner
- In August 2009, Alcatel-Lucent receives FCC certification for LTE base stations for the 700 MHz spectrum band.
- In September 2009, Nokia Siemens Networks demonstrated the world's first LTE call on standards-compliant commercial software.
- In October 2009, Ericsson and Samsung demonstrated interoperability between the first ever commercial LTE device and the live network in Stockholm, Sweden.
- In October 2009, Alcatel-Lucent's Bell Labs, Deutsche Telekom Innovation Laboratories, the Fraunhofer Heinrich-Hertz Institut, and antenna supplier Kathrein conducted live field tests of a technology called Coordinated Multipoint Transmission (CoMP) aimed at increasing the data transmission speeds of LTE and 3G networks.
- In November 2009, Alcatel-Lucent completed the first live LTE call using 800 MHz spectrum band set aside as part of the European Digital Dividend (EDD).
- In November 2009, Nokia Siemens Networks and LG completed first end-to-end interoperability testing of LTE.
- On December 14, 2009, the first commercial LTE deployment was in the Scandinavian capitals Stockholm and Oslo by the Swedish-Finnish network operator TeliaSonera and its Norwegian brand name NetCom (Norway). TeliaSonera incorrectly branded the network "4G". The modem devices on offer were manufactured by Samsung (dongle GT-B3710), and the network infrastructure with SingleRAN technology created by Huawei (in Oslo) and Ericsson (in Stockholm). TeliaSonera plans to roll out nationwide LTE across Sweden, Norway and Finland. TeliaSonera used spectral bandwidth of 10 MHz (out of the maximum 20 MHz), and Single-Input and Single-Output transmission. The deployment should have provided a physical layer net bit rates of up to 50 Mbit/s downlink and 25 Mbit/s in the uplink. Introductory tests showed a TCP goodput of 42.8 Mbit/s downlink and 5.3 Mbit/s uplink in Stockholm.
- In December 2009, ST-Ericsson and Ericsson first to achieve LTE and HSPA mobility with a multimode device.
- In January 2010, Alcatel-Lucent and LG complete a live handoff of an end-to-end data call between LTE and CDMA networks.
- In February 2010, Nokia Siemens Networks and Movistar tested the LTE in Mobile World Congress 2010 in Barcelona, Spain, with both indoor and outdoor demonstrations.
- In May 2010, Mobile TeleSystems (MTS) and Huawei showed an indoor LTE network at "Sviaz-Expocomm 2010" in Moscow, Russia. MTS expects to start a trial LTE service in Moscow by the beginning of 2011. Earlier, MTS has received a license to build an LTE network in Uzbekistan and intends to commence a test LTE network in Ukraine in partnership with Alcatel-Lucent.
- At the Shanghai Expo 2010 in May 2010, Motorola demonstrated a live LTE in conjunction with China Mobile. This included video streams and a drive test system using TD-LTE.
- As of 12/10/2010, DirecTV has teamed up with Verizon Wireless for a test of high-speed LTE wireless technology in a few homes in Pennsylvania, designed to deliver an integrated Internet and TV bundle. Verizon Wireless said it launched LTE wireless services (for data, no voice) in 38 markets where more than 110 million Americans live on Sunday, Dec. 5.
- On May 6, 2011, Sri Lanka Telecom Mobitel demonstrated 4G LTE for the first time in South Asia, achieving a data rate of 96 Mbit/s in Sri Lanka.

=== Carrier adoption timeline ===
Most carriers supporting GSM or HSUPA networks can be expected to upgrade their networks to LTE at some stage. A complete list of commercial contracts can be found at:

- August 2009: Telefónica selected six countries to field-test LTE in the succeeding months: Spain, the United Kingdom, Germany and the Czech Republic in Europe, and Brazil and Argentina in Latin America.
- On November 24, 2009: Telecom Italia announced the first outdoor pre-commercial experimentation in the world, deployed in Turin and totally integrated into the 2G/3G network then in service.
- On December 14, 2009, the world's first publicly available LTE service was opened by TeliaSonera in the two Scandinavian capitals Stockholm and Oslo.
- On May 28, 2010, Russian operator Scartel announced the launch of an LTE network in Kazan by the end of 2010.
- On October 6, 2010, Canadian provider Rogers Communications Inc announced that Ottawa, Canada's national capital, would be the site of LTE trials. Rogers said it will expand on this testing and move to a comprehensive technical trial of LTE on both low- and high-band frequencies across the Ottawa area.
- On May 6, 2011, Sri Lanka Telecom Mobitel successfully demonstrated 4G LTE for the first time in South Asia, achieving a data rate of 96 Mbit/s in Sri Lanka.
- On May 7, 2011, Sri Lankan Mobile Operator Dialog Axiata PLC switched on the first pilot 4G LTE Network in South Asia with vendor partner Huawei and demonstrated a download data speed up to 127 Mbit/s.
- On February 9, 2012, Telus Mobility initially launched their LTE service in metropolitan areas including Vancouver, Calgary, Edmonton, Toronto and the Greater Toronto Area, Kitchener, Waterloo, Hamilton, Guelph, Belleville, Ottawa, Montreal, Québec City, Halifax and Yellowknife.
- Telus Mobility has announced that it will adopt LTE as its 4G wireless standard.
- Cox Communications has its first tower for wireless LTE network build-out. Wireless services launched in late 2009.
- In March 2019, the Global Mobile Suppliers Association reported that there were now 717 operators with commercially launched LTE networks (broadband fixed wireless access and or mobile).

The following is a list of the top 10 countries/territories by 4G LTE coverage as measured by OpenSignal.com in February/March 2019.

Rank	Country/territory	Penetration
1	South Korea	97.5%
2	Japan	96.3%
3	Norway	95.5%
4	Hong Kong	94.1%
5	United States	93.0%
6	Netherlands	92.8%
7	Taiwan	92.8%
8	Hungary	91.4%
9	Sweden	91.1%
10	India	90.9%

For the complete list of all the countries/territories, see list of countries by 4G LTE penetration.

== LTE-TDD and LTE-FDD ==
Long Term Evolution Time-Division Duplex (LTE-TDD), also referred to as TDD LTE, is a 4G telecommunications technology and standard co-developed by an international coalition of companies, including China Mobile, Datang Telecom, Huawei, ZTE, Nokia Solutions and Networks, Qualcomm, Samsung, and ST-Ericsson. It is one of the two mobile data transmission technologies of the Long Term Evolution (LTE) technology standard, the other being Long Term Evolution Frequency-Division Duplex (LTE-FDD). While some companies refer to LTE-TDD as "TD-LTE" for familiarity with TD-SCDMA, there is no reference to that abbreviation anywhere in the 3GPP specifications.

There are two major differences between LTE-TDD and LTE-FDD: how data is uploaded and downloaded, and what frequency spectra the networks are deployed in. While LTE-FDD uses paired frequencies to upload and download data, LTE-TDD uses a single frequency, alternating between uploading and downloading data through time. The ratio between uploads and downloads on a LTE-TDD network can be changed dynamically, depending on whether more data needs to be sent or received. LTE-TDD and LTE-FDD also operate on different frequency bands, with LTE-TDD working better at higher frequencies, and LTE-FDD working better at lower frequencies. Frequencies used for LTE-TDD range from 1850 MHz to 3800 MHz, with several different bands being used. The LTE-TDD spectrum is generally cheaper to access, and has less traffic. Further, the bands for LTE-TDD overlap with those used for WiMAX, which can easily be upgraded to support LTE-TDD.

Despite the differences in how the two types of LTE handle data transmission, LTE-TDD and LTE-FDD share 90 percent of their core technology, making it possible for the same chipsets and networks to use both versions of LTE. A number of companies produce dual-mode chips or mobile devices, including Samsung and Qualcomm, while operators CMHK and Hi3G Access have developed dual-mode networks in Hong Kong and Sweden, respectively.

=== History of LTE-TDD ===
The creation of LTE-TDD involved a coalition of international companies that worked to develop and test the technology. China Mobile was an early proponent of LTE-TDD, along with other companies like Datang Telecom and Huawei, which worked to deploy LTE-TDD networks, and later developed technology allowing LTE-TDD equipment to operate in white spaces—frequency spectra between broadcast TV stations. Intel also participated in the development, setting up a LTE-TDD interoperability lab with Huawei in China, as well as ST-Ericsson, Nokia, and Nokia Siemens (now Nokia Solutions and Networks), which developed LTE-TDD base stations that increased capacity by 80 percent and coverage by 40 percent. Qualcomm also participated, developing the world's first multi-mode chip, combining both LTE-TDD and LTE-FDD, along with HSPA and EV-DO. Accelleran, a Belgian company, has also worked to build small cells for LTE-TDD networks.

Trials of LTE-TDD technology began as early as 2010, with Reliance Industries and Ericsson India conducting field tests of LTE-TDD in India, achieving 80 megabit-per second download speeds and 20 megabit-per-second upload speeds. By 2011, China Mobile began trials of the technology in six cities.

Although initially seen as a technology utilized by only a few countries, including China and India, by 2011 international interest in LTE-TDD had expanded, especially in Asia, in part due to LTE-TDD's lower cost of deployment compared to LTE-FDD. By the middle of that year, 26 networks around the world were conducting trials of the technology. The Global LTve (GTI) was also started in 2011, with founding partners China Mobile, Bharti Airtel, SoftBank Mobile, Vodafone, Clearwire, Aero2 and E-Plus. In September 2011, Huawei announced it would partner with Polish mobile provider Aero2 to develop a combined LTE-TDD and LTE-FDD network in Poland, and by April 2012, ZTE Corporation had worked to deploy trial or commercial LTE-TDD networks for 33 operators in 19 countries. In late 2012, Qualcomm worked extensively to deploy a commercial LTE-TDD network in India, and partnered with Bharti Airtel and Huawei to develop the first multi-mode LTE-TDD smartphone for India.

In Japan, SoftBank Mobile launched LTE-TDD services in February 2012 under the name Advanced eXtended Global Platform (AXGP), and marketed as SoftBank 4G (ja). The AXGP band was previously used for Willcom's PHS service, and after PHS was discontinued in 2010 the PHS band was re-purposed for AXGP service.

In the U.S., Clearwire planned to implement LTE-TDD, with chipmaker Qualcomm agreeing to support Clearwire's frequencies on its multi-mode LTE chipsets. With Sprint's acquisition of Clearwire in 2013, the carrier began using these frequencies for LTE service on networks built by Samsung, Alcatel-Lucent, and Nokia.

As of March 2013, 156 commercial 4G LTE networks existed, including 142 LTE-FDD networks and 14 LTE-TDD networks. As of November 2013, the South Korean government planned to allow a fourth wireless carrier in 2014, which would provide LTE-TDD services, and in December 2013, LTE-TDD licenses were granted to China's three mobile operators, allowing commercial deployment of 4G LTE services.

In January 2014, Nokia Solutions and Networks indicated that it had completed a series of tests of voice over LTE (VoLTE) calls on China Mobile's TD-LTE network. The next month, Nokia Solutions and Networks and Sprint announced that they had demonstrated throughput speeds of 2.6 gigabits per second using a LTE-TDD network, surpassing the previous record of 1.6 gigabits per second.

== Features ==
Much of the LTE standard addresses the upgrading of 3G UMTS to what will eventually be 4G mobile communications technology. A large amount of the work is aimed at simplifying the architecture of the system, as it transitions from the existing UMTS circuit + packet switching combined network to an all-IP flat architecture system. E-UTRA is the air interface of LTE. Its main features are:

- Peak download rates up to 299.6 Mbit/s and upload rates up to 75.4 Mbit/s depending on the user equipment category (with 4×4 antennas using 20 MHz of spectrum). Five different terminal classes have been defined, from a voice-centric class up to a high-end terminal that supports the peak data rates. All terminals will be able to process 20 MHz bandwidth.
- Low data transfer latencies (sub-5 ms latency for small IP packets in optimal conditions), lower latencies for handover and connection setup time than with previous radio access technologies.
- Improved support for mobility exemplified by support for terminals moving at up to 350 km/h (220 mph) or 500 km/h (310 mph) depending on the frequency
- Orthogonal frequency-division multiple access for the downlink, Single-carrier FDMA for the uplink to conserve power.
- Support for both FDD and TDD communication systems as well as half-duplex FDD with the same radio access technology.
- Support for all frequency bands currently used by IMT systems by ITU-R.
- Increased spectrum flexibility: 1.4 MHz, 3 MHz, 5 MHz, 10 MHz, 15 MHz and 20 MHz wide cells are standardized. (W-CDMA has no option for other than 5 MHz slices, leading to some problems rolling out in countries where 5 MHz is a commonly allocated width of the spectrum so would frequently already be in use with legacy standards such as 2G GSM and cdmaOne.)
- Support for cell sizes from tens of meters in radius (femto and picocells) up to 100 km (62 miles) radius macrocells. In the lower frequency bands to be used in rural areas, 5 km (3.1 miles) is the optimal cell size, 30 km (19 miles) having reasonable performance, and up to 100 km cell sizes supported with acceptable performance. In cities and urban areas, higher frequency bands (such as 2.6 GHz in the EU) are used to support high-speed mobile broadband. In this case, cell sizes may be 1 km (0.62 miles) or even less.
- Support of at least 200 active data clients (connected users) in every 5 MHz cell.
- Simplified architecture: The network side of E-UTRAN is composed only of eNode Bs.
- Support for interoperation and co-existence with legacy standards (e.g., GSM/EDGE, UMTS and CDMA2000). Users can start a call or transfer of data in an area using an LTE standard, and, should coverage be unavailable, continue the operation without any action on their part using GSM/GPRS or W-CDMA-based UMTS or even 3GPP2 networks such as cdmaOne or CDMA2000.
- Uplink and downlink Carrier aggregation.
- Packet-switched radio interface.
- Support for MBSFN (multicast-broadcast single-frequency network). This feature can deliver services such as mobile TV using the LTE infrastructure and is a competitor for DVB-H-based TV broadcast. Only LTE compatible devices receive LTE signal.

== Voice calls ==
cs domLTE CSFB to GSM/UMTS network interconnects

The LTE standard supports only packet switching with its all-IP network. Voice calls in GSM, UMTS, and CDMA2000 are circuit switched, so with the adoption of LTE, carriers will have to re-engineer their voice call network. Four different approaches sprang up:

Voice over LTE (VoLTE)

Circuit-switched fallback (CSFB)
In this approach, LTE just provides data services, and when a voice call is to be initiated or received, it will fall back to the circuit-switched domain. When using this solution, operators just need to upgrade the MSC instead of deploying the IMS, and therefore, can provide services quickly. However, the disadvantage is a longer call setup delay.

Simultaneous voice and LTE (SVLTE)
In this approach, the handset works simultaneously in the LTE and circuit-switched modes, with the LTE mode providing data services and the circuit-switched mode providing the voice service. This is a solution solely based on the handset, which does not have special requirements on the network and does not require the deployment of IMS either. The disadvantage of this solution is that the phone can become expensive with high power consumption.

Single Radio Voice Call Continuity (SRVCC)

One additional approach that is not initiated by operators is the usage of over-the-top content (OTT) services, using applications like Skype and Google Talk to provide LTE voice service.

Most major backers of LTE preferred and promoted VoLTE from the beginning. The lack of software support in initial LTE devices, as well as core network devices, however, led to a number of carriers promoting VoLGA (Voice over LTE Generic Access) as an interim solution. The idea was to use the same principles as GAN (Generic Access Network, also known as UMA or Unlicensed Mobile Access), which defines the protocols through which a mobile handset can perform voice calls over a customer's private Internet connection, usually over wireless LAN. VoLGA however never gained much support, because VoLTE (IMS) promises much more flexible services, albeit at the cost of having to upgrade the entire voice call infrastructure. VoLTE may require Single Radio Voice Call Continuity (SRVCC) to be able to smoothly perform a handover to a 2G or 3G network in case of poor LTE signal quality.

While the industry has standardized on VoLTE, early LTE deployments required carriers to introduce circuit-switched fallback as a stopgap measure. When placing or receiving a voice call on a non-VoLTE-enabled network or device, LTE handsets will fall back to old 2G or 3G networks for the duration of the call.

=== Enhanced voice quality ===
To ensure compatibility, 3GPP demands at least AMR-NB codec (narrow band), but the recommended speech codec for VoLTE is Adaptive Multi-Rate Wideband, also known as HD Voice. This codec is mandated in 3GPP networks that support 16 kHz sampling.

Fraunhofer IIS has proposed and demonstrated "Full-HD Voice", an implementation of the AAC-ELD (Advanced Audio Coding – Enhanced Low Delay) codec for LTE handsets. Where previous cell phone voice codecs only supported frequencies up to 3.5 kHz and upcoming wideband audio services branded as HD Voice up to 7 kHz, Full-HD Voice supports the entire bandwidth range from 20 Hz to 20 kHz. For end-to-end Full-HD Voice calls to succeed, however, both the caller's and recipient's handsets, as well as networks, have to support the feature.

== Frequency bands ==
The LTE standard covers a range of many different bands, each of which is designated by both a frequency and a band number:

- North America – 600, 700, 850, 1700, 1900, 2300, 2500, 2600, 3500, 5000 MHz (bands 2, 4, 5, 7, 12, 13, 14, 17, 25, 26, 28, 29, 30, 38, 40, 41, 42, 43, 46, 48, 66, 71)
- Central America, South America and the Caribbean – 600, 700, 800, 850, 900, 1700, 1800, 1900, 2100, 2300, 2500, 2600, 3500, 5000 MHz (bands 1, 2, 3, 4, 5, 7, 8, 12, 13, 14, 17, 20, 25, 26, 28, 29, 38, 40, 41, 42, 43, 46, 48, 66, 71)
- Europe – 420, 450, 700, 800, 900, 1500, 1800, 2100, 2300, 2600, 3500, 3700 MHz (bands 1, 3, 7, 8, 20, 22, 28, 31, 32, 38, 40, 42, 43, 88)
- Asia – 450, 700, 800, 850, 900, 1500, 1800, 1900, 2100, 2300, 2500, 2600, 3500 MHz (bands 1, 3, 5, 7, 8, 11, 18, 19, 20, 21, 26, 28, 31, 38, 39, 40, 41, 42)
- Africa – 700, 800, 850, 900, 1800, 2100, 2300, 2500, 2600 MHz (bands 1, 3, 5, 7, 8, 20, 28, 40, 41)
- Oceania (incl. Australia and New Zealand) – 700, 850, 900, 1800, 2100, 2300, 2600 MHz (bands 1, 3, 5, 7, 8, 28, 40)

As a result, phones from one country may not work in other countries. Users will need a multi-band capable phone for roaming internationally.

== Patents ==
According to the European Telecommunications Standards Institute's (ETSI) intellectual property rights (IPR) database, about 50 companies have declared, as of March 2012, holding essential patents covering the LTE standard. The ETSI has made no investigation on the correctness of the declarations however, so that "any analysis of essential LTE patents should take into account more than ETSI declarations." Independent studies have found that about 3.3 to 5 percent of all revenues from handset manufacturers are spent on standard-essential patents. This is less than the combined published rates, due to reduced-rate licensing agreements, such as cross-licensing.

== See also ==
- 4G-LTE filter
- List of LTE networks
- List of wireless network protocols
- E-UTRA – the radio access network used in LTE
- HSPA+ – an enhancement of the 3GPP HSPA standard
- Flat IP – flat IP architectures in mobile networks
- LTE-A
- LTE-A Pro
- LTE-U
- Narrowband IoT (NB-IoT)
- Simulation of LTE Networks
- QoS Class Identifier (QCI) – the mechanism used in LTE networks to allocate proper Quality of Service to bearer traffic
- System Architecture Evolution – the re-architecturing of core networks in LTE
- VoLTE
- WiMAX – a competitor to LTE
- 5G NR – the successor to LTE
