= Wi-Fi calling =

Protocol that extends mobile voice, data and multimedia applications over IP networks

Wi-Fi Calling (VoWiFi)

Protocol Specifications
Technology Baseline	IP Multimedia Subsystem (IMS)
Standard Bodies	3GPP, Wi-Fi Alliance
Preceded By	Generic Access Network (GAN/UMA)
Layer Association	Application / Session Layer (OSI Layers 5–7)

Signaling & Media Protocols
Call Control	Session Initiation Protocol (SIP over TLS)
Voice Transport	Real-time Transport Protocol (RTP/SRTP)
NAT Traversal	STUN / Session Border Controller

Security & Core Integration
Tunneling	IPsec via Evolved Packet Data Gateway (ePDG)
Authentication	EAP-SIM / EAP-AKA via SIM credentials
Handover	Seamless Voice Call Continuity (SVCC to VoLTE)

The general symbol that denotes Wi-Fi calling

VoWiFi icons shown in One UI

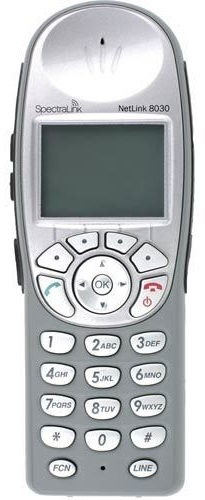
SpectraLink 8030 NetLink Kirk Telecom OEM 2007: Polycom, Nortel, Avaya, Alcatel, Nec, Lucent VoWLAN phone.

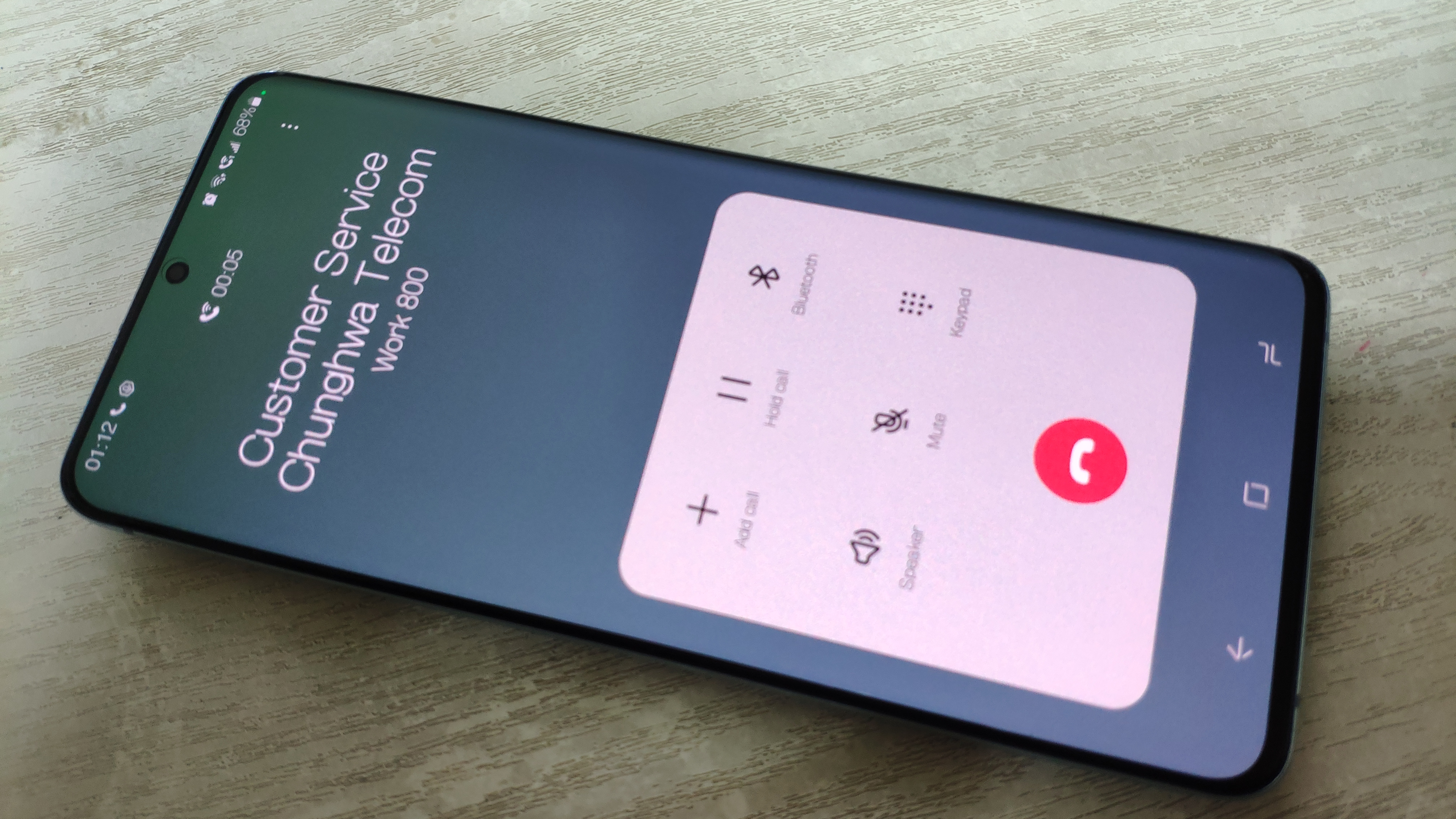
VoWiFi calling

Wi-Fi calling, also called Voice over wireless LAN (VoWLAN) and VoWiFi, refers to mobile phone voice calls and data that are made over IP networks using Wi-Fi, instead of the cell towers provided by cellular networks. In essence, it is voice over IP (VoIP) over a Wi-Fi network.

Using this feature, compatible handsets are able to route regular cellular calls through a wireless LAN (Wi-Fi) network with broadband Internet, while seamlessly changing connections between the two where necessary. This feature makes use of the Generic Access Network (GAN) protocol, also known as Unlicensed Mobile Access (UMA).

Essentially, GAN/UMA allows cell phone packets to be forwarded to a network access point over the internet, rather than over-the-air using GSM/GPRS, UMTS or similar. A separate device known as a "GAN Controller" (GANC) receives this data from the Internet and feeds it into the phone network as if it were coming from an antenna on a tower. Calls can be placed from or received to the handset as if it were connected over-the-air directly to the GANC's point of presence, making the call invisible to the network as a whole. This can be useful in locations with poor cell coverage where some other form of internet access is available, especially at the home or office. The system offers seamless handoff, so the user can move from cell to Wi-Fi and back again with the same invisibility that the cell network offers when moving from tower to tower.

Since the GAN system works over the internet, a UMA-capable handset can connect to its service provider from any location with internet access. This is particularly useful for travelers, who can connect to their provider's GANC and make calls into their home service area from anywhere in the world. This is subject to the quality of the internet connection, however, and may not work well over limited bandwidth or long-latency connection. To improve quality of service (QoS) in the home or office, some providers also supply a specially programmed wireless access point that prioritizes UMA packets. Another benefit of Wi-Fi calling is that mobile calls can be made through the internet using the same native calling client; it does not require third-party Voice over IP (VoIP) closed services like WhatsApp or Skype, relying instead on the mobile cellular operator.

== Technology ==
The GAN protocol that extends mobile voice, data and multimedia (IP Multimedia Subsystem/Session Initiation Protocol (IMS/SIP)) applications over IP networks. The latest generation system is named VoWiFi by a number of handset manufacturers, including Apple and Samsung, a move that is being mirrored by carriers like T-Mobile US and Vodafone. The service is dependent on IMS, IPsec, IWLAN and ePDG.

=== Modes of operation ===
The original Release 6 GAN specification supported a 2G (A/Gb) connection from the GANC into the mobile core network (MSC/GSN). Today all commercial GAN dual-mode handset deployments are based on a 2G connection and all GAN enabled devices are dual-mode 2G/Wi-Fi. The specification, though, defined support for multimode handset operation. Therefore, 3G/2G/Wi-Fi handsets are supported in the standard. The first 3G/UMA devices were announced in the second half of 2008.

A typical UMA/GAN handset will have four modes of operation:

- GERAN-only: uses only cellular networks
- GERAN-preferred: uses cellular networks if available, otherwise the 802.11 radio
- GAN-preferred: uses an 802.11 connection if an access point is in range, otherwise the cellular network
- GAN-only: uses only the 802.11 connection

In all cases, the handset scans for GSM cells when it first turns on, to determine its location area. This allows the carrier to route the call to the nearest GANC, set the correct rate plan, and comply with existing roaming agreements.

At the end of 2007, the GAN specification was enhanced to support 3G (Iu) interfaces from the GANC to the mobile core network (MSC/GSN). This native 3G interface can be used for dual-mode handset as well as 3G femtocell service delivery. The GAN release 8 documentation describes these new capabilities.

=== UMA/GAN beyond dual-mode ===
While UMA is nearly always associated with dual-mode GSM/Wi-Fi services, it is actually a ‘generic’ access network technology that provides a generic method for extending the services and applications in an operator's mobile core (voice, data, IMS) over IP and the public Internet.

GAN defines a secure, managed connection from the mobile core (GANC) to different devices/access points over IP.

- Femtocells: The GAN standard is currently used to provide a secure, managed, standardized interface from a femtocell to the mobile core network. Recently Kineto, NEC and Motorola issued a joint proposal to the 3GPP work group studying femtocells (also known as ‘Home Node B's or HNB) to propose GAN as the basis for that standard.
- Analog terminal adaptors (ATAs): T-Mobile US once offered a fixed-line VoIP service called @Home. Similar to Vonage, consumers can port their fixed phone number to T-Mobile. Then T-Mobile associates that number with an analog telephone adapter. The consumer plugs the ATA into a home broadband network and begins receiving calls to the fixed number over the IP access network. The service was discontinued in 2010; however, earlier subscribers were "grandfathered" in.
- Mobile VoIP client: Consumers have started to use telephony interfaces on their PCs. Applications offer a low-cost, convenient way to access telephony services while traveling. Now mobile operators can offer a similar service with a UMA-enabled mobile VoIP client. The client provides a mirror interface to a subscriber's existing mobile service. For the mobile operator, services can now be extended to a computer, and they can give consumers another way to use their mobile service.

=== Design considerations ===
A Wi-Fi network that supports voice telephony must be carefully designed in a way that maximizes performance and is able to support the applicable call density. A voice network includes call gateways in addition to the Wi-Fi access points. The gateways provide call handling among wireless IP phones and connections to traditional telephone systems. The Wi-Fi network supporting voice applications must provide much stronger signal coverage than what's needed for most data-only applications. In addition, the Wi-Fi network must provide seamless roaming between access points.

== History ==
UMA was developed by a group of operator and vendor companies. The initial specifications were published on 2 September 2004. The companies then contributed the specifications to the 3rd Generation Partnership Project (3GPP) as part of 3GPP work item "Generic Access to A/Gb interfaces". On 8 April 2005, 3GPP approved specifications for Generic Access to A/Gb interfaces for 3GPP Release 6 and renamed the system to GAN. But the term GAN is little known outside the 3GPP community, and the term UMA is more common in marketing.

== Advantages ==
For carriers:

- Instead of erecting expensive base stations to cover dead zones, GAN allows carriers to add coverage using low-cost 802.11 access points. Subscribers at home have very good coverage.
- In addition, GAN relieves congestion (meaning that networks can, through GAN, essentially piggyback on other infrastructure) on the GSM or UMTS spectrum by removing common types of calls and routing them to the operator via the relatively low-cost Internet.
- GAN makes sense for network operators that also offer Internet services. Operators can leverage sales of one to promote the other, and can bill both to each customer.
- Some other operators also run networks of 802.11 hotspots, such as T-Mobile. They can leverage these hotspots to create more capacity and provide better coverage in populous areas.
- The carrier does not pay for much of the service, the party who provides the Internet and Wi-Fi connection pays for a connection to the Internet, effectively paying the expensive part of routing calls from the subscriber. However, carriers typically do not pass on these savings in the form of lower bills to customers who use Wi-Fi for calls.

For subscribers:

- Subscribers do not rely on their operator's ability to roll out towers and coverage, allowing them to fix some types of coverage dead zones (such as in the home or workplace) themselves.
- GAN often provides lower rates when roaming internationally.
- GAN is currently the only commercial technology available that combines GSM and 802.11 into a service that uses a single number, a single handset, a single set of services and a single phone directory for all calls.
- GAN can migrate between IP and cellular coverage and is thus seamless; in contrast, calls via third-party VOIP plus a data phone are dropped when leaving high-volume data coverage.

== Disadvantages ==
- Subscribers must upgrade to Wi-Fi/UMA enabled handsets to take advantage of the service.
- Calls may be more prone to disconnect when the handset transitions from Wi-Fi to the standard wireless service and vice versa (because the handset moved out or within the Wi-Fi's range). How much this is a problem may vary based on which handset is used.
- The UMA may use different frequency that is more prone to some types of interference
- Some setup may be required to provide connection settings (such as authentication details) before advantages may be experienced. This may take time for subscribers and require additional support to be provided. The costs of support may be for more than the wireless phone company: network administrators may be asked to help a user enter appropriate settings into a phone (that the network administrator may know little about).
- The phones that support multiple signals (both the UMA/Wi-Fi and the type of signal used by the provider's towers) may be more expensive, particularly to manufacture, due to additional circuitry/components required
- This uses the resources of the network providing the Wi-Fi signal (and any indirect network that is then utilized when that network is used). Bandwidth is used up. Some types of network traffic (like DNS and IPsec-encrypted) need to be permitted by the network, so a decision to support this may impose some requirement(s) regarding the network's security (firewall) rules.
- Using GAN/UMA on a mobile requires the WiFi module to be enabled. This in turn drains the battery faster, and reduces both the talk time and standby time when compared to disabling GAN/UMA (and in turn WiFi).
- UMA doesn't work with cellular-based E911 that uses GPS/Assisted GPS. Usually this is addressed by having the subscriber register a fixed primary address with the carrier via mobile settings, a carrier-provided app or website.
- No QoS guarantees. The Internet (and by extension most home networks) operates on a best-effort delivery model, so network congestion can interfere with call quality. Usually a problem for the subscriber's home network as gaming, high definition video, or P2P file sharing competes for available bandwidth. Some network equipment can deal with this by enabling QoS for VoIP protocols, however is complicated by the fact most UMA runs over IPsec over UDP which makes the underlying protocols (IMS/SIP) opaque from a network perspective. Handsets can mitigate this by prioritizing the IPsec traffic internally to a different WMM class (such as AC_VO). This also requires rest of the subscriber's network (if it's not wholly integrated as in most home WiFi routers/access-points) knowing how to take such traffic and prioritize it over other bulk/latency-sensitive traffic.

== Service deployments ==
The first service launch was BT with BT Fusion in the autumn of 2005. The service is based on pre-3GPP GAN standard technology. Initially, BT Fusion used UMA over Bluetooth with phones from Motorola. From January 2007, it used UMA over 802.11 with phones from Nokia, Motorola and Samsung and was branded as a "Wi-Fi mobile service". BT has since discontinued the service.

On August 28, 2006, TeliaSonera was the first to launch an 802.11 based UMA service called "Home Free". The service started in Denmark but is no longer offered.

On September 25, 2006 Orange announced its "Unik service", also known as Signal Boost in the UK. However this service is no longer available to new customers in the UK. The announcement, the largest to date, covers more than 60m of Orange's mobile subscribers in the UK, France, Poland, Spain and the Netherlands.

Cincinnati Bell announced the first UMA deployment in the United States. The service, originally called CB Home Run, allows users to transfer seamlessly from the Cincinnati Bell cellular network to a home wireless network or to Cincinnati Bell's WiFi HotSpots. It has since been rebranded as Fusion WiFi.

This was followed shortly by T-Mobile US on June 27, 2007. T-Mobile's service, originally named "Hotspot Calling", and rebranded to "Wi-Fi Calling" in 2009, allows users to seamlessly transfer from the T-Mobile cellular network to an 802.11x wireless network or T-Mobile HotSpot in the United States.

In Canada, both Fido and Rogers Wireless launched UMA plans under the names UNO and Rogers Home Calling Zone (later rebranded Talkspot, and subsequently rebranded again as Wi-Fi Calling), respectively, on May 6, 2008.

In Australia, GAN has been implemented by Vodafone, Optus and Telstra.

Since 10 April 2015, Wi-Fi Calling has been available for customers of EE in the UK initially on the Nokia Lumia 640 and Samsung Galaxy S6 and Samsung Galaxy S6 Edge handsets.

In March 2016, Vodafone Netherlands launched Wi-Fi Calling support along with VoLTE.

Since the Autumn of 2016, Wifi Calling / Voice over Wifi has been available for customers of Telenor Denmark, including the ability to do handover to and from the 4G (VoLTE) network. This is available for several Samsung and Apple handsets.

AT&T and Verizon launched Wi-Fi calling in 2015.

Industry organisation UMA Today tracks all operator activities and handset development.

In September 2015, South African cellular network Cell C launched WiFi Calling on its South African network.

In November 2024, Belgian cellular network Voo launched WiFi Calling on its Belgian network.

== Similar technologies ==
GAN/UMA is not the first system to allow the use of unlicensed spectrum to connect handsets to a GSM network. The GIP/IWP standard for DECT provides similar functionality, but requires a more direct connection to the GSM network from the base station. While dual-mode DECT/GSM phones have appeared, these have generally been functionally cordless phones with a GSM handset built-in (or vice versa, depending on your point of view), rather than phones implementing DECT/GIP, due to the lack of suitable infrastructure to hook DECT base-stations supporting GIP to GSM networks on an ad-hoc basis.

GAN/UMA's ability to use the Internet to provide the "last mile" connection to the GSM network solves the major issue that DECT/GIP has faced. Had GIP emerged as a practical standard, the low power usage of DECT technology when idle would have been an advantage compared to GAN.

There is nothing preventing an operator from deploying micro- and pico-cells that use towers that connect with the home network over the Internet. Several companies have developed femtocell systems that do precisely that, broadcasting a "real" GSM or UMTS signal, bypassing the need for special handsets that require 802.11 technology. In theory, such systems are more universal, and again require lower power than 802.11, but their legality will vary depending on the jurisdiction, and will require the cooperation of the operator. Further, users may be charged at higher cell phone rates, even though they are paying for the DSL or other network that ultimately carries their traffic; in contrast, GAN/UMA providers charge reduced rates when making calls off the providers cellular phone network.

== See also ==
- IP Multimedia Subsystem
- IEEE 802.21
- IEEE 802.11r
- IEEE 802.11u
- MoIP (disambiguation)
- Voice over LTE
- Local area network
- Mobile VoIP
