= List of mobile virtual network operators in the United Kingdom =

This is a list of notable mobile virtual network operators (MVNOs) in the United Kingdom, which lease wireless telephone and data spectrum from the major carriers EE, O2, Three and Vodafone for resale.

== Active operators ==
Brand	Host network	MVNE	MVNO type	Start date	Notes
1pMobile	EE	Direct with MNO	PAYG	2016	
Asda Mobile	Vodafone	Direct with MNO	PAYM/PAYG	2007	
BT Mobile	EE	Direct with MNO	PAYM	2015 (original) 2026 (revival)	Revived in 2026 for BT Broadband customers only.
CMLink	EE	Transatel	PAYM	2017	By China Mobile. Intended primarily for the Chinese diaspora and Chinese international students.
CTExcel	EE	Transatel	PAYG	2012 as CTExcelbiz	By China Telecom. Intended primarily for the Chinese diaspora and Chinese international students.
Ecotalk	EE	Transatel	PAYM	2018	
giffgaff	O2	Direct with MNO	PAYM/PAYG	2009	MVNO indirectly run by host network.
iD Mobile	Three	Direct with MNO	PAYM/PAYG	2015	
Lebara	Vodafone		PAYM/PAYG	2007	
Lyca Mobile	EE	Direct with MNO	PAYM/PAYG	2006	
Sky Mobile	O2	Direct with MNO	PAYM	2016	
SMARTY	Three		PAYM/PAYG	2017	MVNO run by host network.
spusu	EE	Direct with MNO	PAYM	2023	Uses their own PLMN (234-40), self-hosted SIP IMS and core network infrastructure.
Superdrug Mobile	Three	Direct with MNO	PAYG	2018	
Talkmobile	Vodafone	MVNO run by host network	PAYM	2007	
Tesco Mobile	O2	Direct with MNO	PAYM/PAYG	2003	
Your Co-op	EE	Transatel	PAYM		Previously trading as The Phone Co-op
1GLOBAL	EE		PAYG	2006	Acquired Truphone
Utility Warehouse	EE		PAYM	2000	
VOXI	Vodafone	Direct with MNO	PAYG	2017	MVNO run by host network, directly linked in with host's core systems.

== Defunct, merged and acquired operators ==
Brand	Host network	Defunct date	Notes
Andrews & Arnold	Three	30 April 2013	Ceased operations when their upstream partner "pulled the plug".
Blyk	Orange	26 August 2009	Ceased operations.
Easymobile	T-Mobile	13 December 2006	Ceased operations.
Econet Mobile	EE	20 July 2015	Ceased UK operations.
Family Mobile	EE	31 August 2015	Ceased operations. Formerly IKEA Family Mobile.
FreedomPop	Three	?	Ceased UK operations.
Fresh Mobile	T-Mobile	19 March 2010	Ceased operations. Existing customers were encouraged to move to the sister network, Talkmobile.
GT Mobile	O2	July 2016	Existing customers were consolidated in the sister brand, Lycamobile. Full name is Gnanam Telecom.
KCOM Mobile	O2	2019	Ceased operations.
LIFE Mobile	EE	29 November 2016	Acquired by Plusnet.
Mobile by Sainsbury's	Vodafone	15 January 2016	Ceased operations.
Ovivo Mobile	Vodafone	19 March 2014	Ceased operations.
Plusnet Mobile	EE	January 2024	Ceased operations; stopped accepting new customers from March 2023.
Post Office Mobile	EE	8 August 2016	Ceased operations.
RSPCA Mobile	EE	October 2014	Ceased operations. Operated as a white-label under Shebang.
TalkTalk Mobile	Vodafone	2018	Ceased operations.
The People's Operator (TPO Mobile)	Three	26 February 2019	Entered administration. Customers were encouraged to move to SMARTY.
Utilita Mobile	EE	Approximately 2022	
Virgin Mobile	O2	31 August 2023	Stopped accepting new customers August 2023. All customers moved to O2 by December 2023.

== See also ==
- List of mobile network operators in Europe § United Kingdom
- Telecommunications in the United Kingdom
