= Marc Allera =

Chair of Global Sport Group

Marc Allera in 2024

Marc David Allera (born April 1972) is the chair of CVC-backed sports investment platform Global Sport Group, chairman of UK video game company Jagex and former CEO of BT's consumer-facing brands: BT, EE and Plusnet. He was previously the Chief Commercial Officer at EE.

== Early life ==
Allera was born in Howden in 1972, then in the East Riding of Yorkshire (pre-1974). He is of Italian descent. He attended France Hill School (now called Kings International College) in Camberley.

Allera graduated in International Business Studies from Sheffield Hallam University (Sheffield Business School) in 1995.

== Career ==
=== Sega ===
From 1997 until 2001 he was UK General Manager of video game company Sega Corporation.

=== Three ===
Allera joined Three UK in March 2001, where he held several prominent positions, including Chief Commercial Officer and Sales and Marketing Director. He is acknowledged as being a key person behind Three's transformation from a start-up to one of the largest mobile networks in the UK market. The company was launched in March 2003.

=== EE ===
He joined EE in December 2011 from Three UK.

He became Chief Executive Officer (CEO) of EE on 29 January 2016. As CEO, he was in charge of all Commercial and Sales activities throughout a multi-channel operation that included Digital, Retail, Tele-sales, and Customer Base Management. EE was the first to implement 5G in the United Kingdom.

On 1 September 2017, Marc was promoted to CEO of BT's Consumer division after BT Group's takeover of EE in 2016. BT is headquartered in London. In 2018 and 2019, Marc won the Power 50 Person of the Year, a mobile industry award.

He resigned from his role after 9 years on March 31 2025.

=== Jagex ===
In March 2024, he was appointed as Chairman of the Board of Jagex by new owners CVC Capital Partners.

=== Global Sport Group ===
In June 2025, Allera was appointed chair of CVC-backed sports investment platform Global Sport Group, which owns stakes in La Liga, Ligue 1, WTA, Six Nations, PREM Rugby, United Rugby Championship, Volleyball World and Equine Network.

== See also ==
- David Dyson, Chief Executive since July 2011 of Three UK
- Nick Jeffery, Chief Executive since September 2016 of Vodafone UK

Business positions
Preceded by Olaf Swantee	Chief Executive of EE Limited; January 2016 – March 2025	Incumbent
Preceded by	Chief Commercial/Sales Officer of EE Limited; 2011 – 2015	Succeeded by
