= Ovivo =

Ovivo could refer to two distinct companies:

- Ovivo (company), Canadian water treatment company
- Ovivo Mobile, former British mobile virtual network operator
