= Allira =

Allira is a given name. Notable people with the name include:

- Allira Toby (born 1994), Australian soccer player

== See also ==
- Allera
