= TalkTalk Group =

British telecommunications company

TalkTalk Telecom Group Limited
- Trade name: TalkTalk
- Formerly: New TalkTalk plc (2009–2010); TalkTalk Telecom Group plc (2010–2021)
- Industry: Telecommunications; Internet television
- Founded: February 2003; 23 years ago in Leeds, England
- Fate: Administration, assets sold to BT Group
- Headquarters: Salford, England, UK
- Area served: United Kingdom
- Key people: Sir Charles Dunstone (executive chairman); Dame Tristia Harrison (CEO)
- Products: Fixed line telephony, internet services, digital television
- Revenue: ▼£1,557 million (2020)
- Operating income: ▲£115 million (2020)
- Net income: ▲£153 million (2020)
- Parent: BT Group
- Divisions: TalkTalk; PXC
- Subsidiaries: TalkTalk Technology; TalkTalk TV Store
- Website: www.talktalkgroup.com

TalkTalk Telecom Group Limited (formerly New TalkTalk plc from 2009–2010 and TalkTalk Telecom Group plc from 2010–2021; commonly known as TalkTalk Group, trading as TalkTalk) is a British telecommunications company that provides broadband internet, fixed line and pay television services to consumers in the United Kingdom. It was founded in 2003 as a subsidiary of Carphone Warehouse and was demerged as a standalone company in March 2010. Its headquarters are in Salford.

Originally, just a provider of fixed line telephone services to consumers, TalkTalk now offers broadband, telephone and pay television services to consumers under the TalkTalk brand. TalkTalk previously operated a mobile phone service called TalkTalk Mobile, but this closed to new customers in 2018. Like some other UK broadband providers, TalkTalk has invested in its own exchange infrastructure, known as local-loop-unbundling (LLU), with 92% of its customer base unbundled as of December 2012. TalkTalk is now one of the "big four" internet service providers, the others being BT (EE), Sky and Virgin Media.

The company was listed on the London Stock Exchange until it was acquired by Toscafund Asset Management in March 2021.

== History ==
=== Establishment ===
The Carphone Warehouse's acquisition of Opal Telecom in November 2002 gave it its own switching network providing access to BT Wholesale's landline network. An initial trial was conducted in the Manchester region, and three months later, TalkTalk launched with a guarantee that calls would be cheaper than with their perceived chief competitor BT. TalkTalk Broadband was launched in November 2004.

On 11 April 2006, TalkTalk launched a new broadband service which was promoted as "Free broadband forever" and which offered up to 8 Mbit/s with a 40 GB monthly usage limit for life to all subscribers to their Talk3 International telephone tariff at £20.99/month. Conditions included signing up for a minimum 18-month contract and a £29.99 initial connection fee. That same year, the Advertising Standards Authority (ASA) challenged the legitimacy of TalkTalk's claim that this service was truly "free".

Due to the high number of customers who signed up to the free broadband service, the "Free broadband forever" launch suffered complaints with regard to a long waiting list to join the broadband programme and many difficulties in contacting TalkTalk customer services. In a Sunday Times interview, TalkTalk chairman Charles Dunstone admitted that Carphone's TalkTalk business was "struggling to cope" with the more than 400,000 customers who signed up for high-speed Internet access in the time since the service launched. TalkTalk allowed customers to escape the binding 18-month contract for broadband "if it had failed to keep its service commitments in their case". Dunstone stated "In about 20% of customers there is some kind of problem with the phone exchange, the line, or something else. A customer satisfaction poll by uSwitch in November 2006 placed TalkTalk and Orange joint bottom for customer satisfaction.

By 2005, TalkTalk had 2.5 million customers following the acquisitions of the UK subsidiaries of Tele2 for £11.5 million and One.Tel for £169.6 million. Carphone Warehouse purchased the UK ISP business of AOL in October 2006 for £370m and renamed it AOL Broadband. This had risen to 2.7 million customers by January 2009.

=== Demerger ===
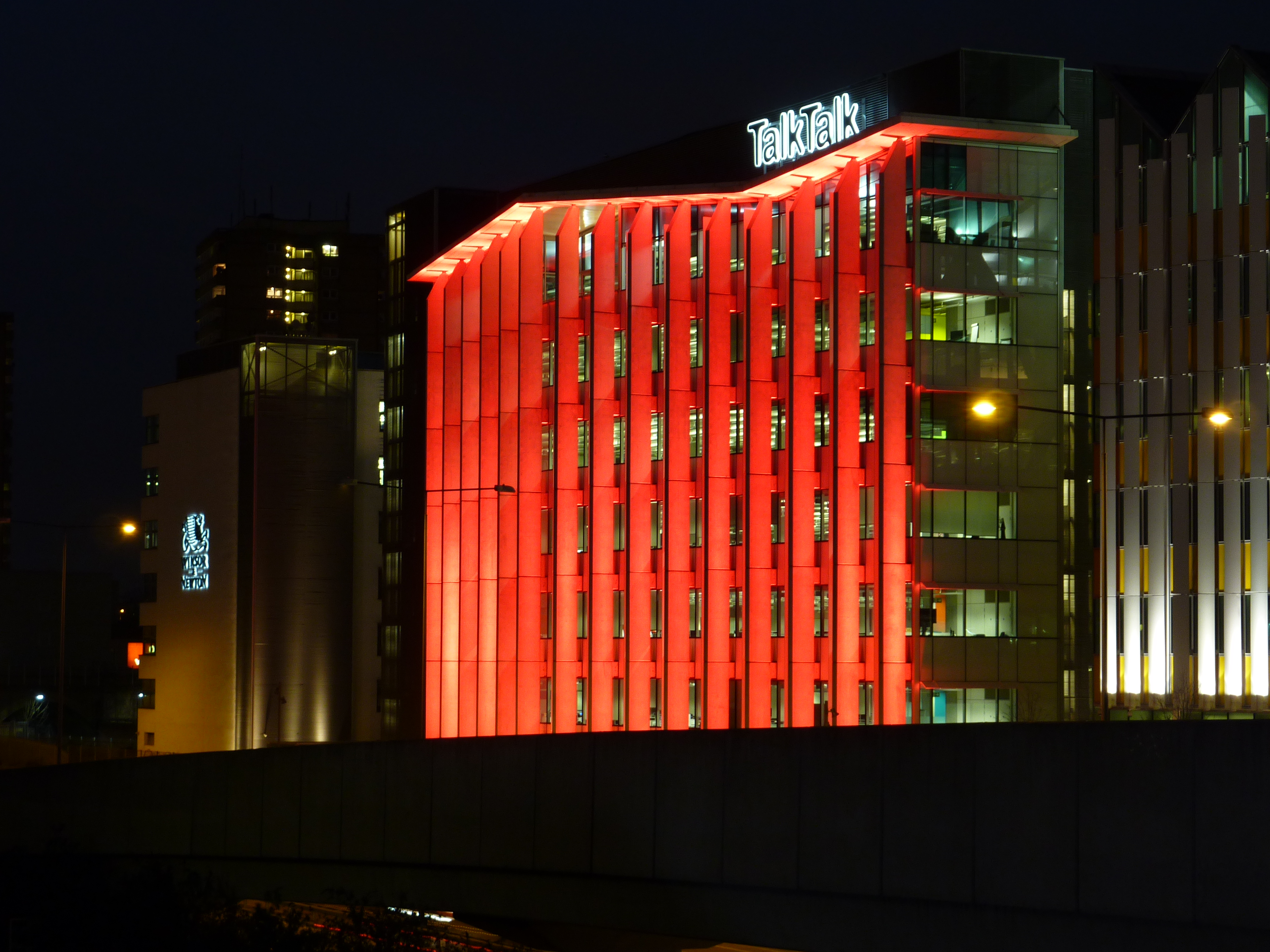
TalkTalk Group head office in Evesham Street, London

In November 2008, Charles Dunstone was reported to be looking to demerge TalkTalk from the main Carphone Warehouse business. The split was confirmed in April 2009, with plans for TalkTalk to become a separate listed company.

Carphone Warehouse agreed to purchase the UK subsidiary of Tiscali in May 2009 for £236 million. The purchase was approved by the European Union Competition Commission in June 2009, and the sale was completed on 6 July 2009. Carphone Warehouse confirmed the business would merge into TalkTalk ahead of the planned demerger. The Carphone Warehouse's full-year earnings statement in November 2009 revealed the TalkTalk customer base had risen to 4.1 million following the purchase of Tiscali UK earlier in the year. Tiscali UK closed to new business on 7 January 2010, and its portal content moved to the TalkTalk website.

In March 2010, TalkTalk and Carphone Warehouse demerged becoming publicly listed companies. Dido Harding became CEO of TalkTalk and Roger Taylor CEO of New Carphone Warehouse.

=== Further development ===
In January 2010, TalkTalk launched a protest against the introduction of the Digital Economy Act 2010, and released a video protesting against the law called "Home taping is killing music". Upon the passing of the bill TalkTalk issued a statement on the company blog confirming it would resist attempts to use the bill against their customers.

In a study carried out by UK telecoms regulator Ofcom in 2010, TalkTalk was found to have average speeds of 7.7-9.3 Mbit/sec, while it was advertised as "up to" 24 Mbit/sec.

TalkTalk was warned by the independent communications regulator Ofcom in November 2010 to rectify its billing systems after 62,000 incorrect bills were sent out. The company was given a deadline to correct the mistakes, which it did not meet, and in August 2011 was duly fined £3 million. Ofcom's figures showed that TalkTalk had incorrectly billed over 65,000 customers between 1 January 2010 and 4 March 2011, mainly relating to issues with integrating Tiscali UK's billing system into its own. The company had been overcharging customers for services that had not been received, resulting in the company paying an additional £2.5 million in refunds.

In November 2014, TalkTalk reached an agreement to purchase the ADSL business of Virgin Media, allowing Virgin to focus on its cable broadband offering. Customers were due to begin transferring to TalkTalk from February 2015.

On 8 January 2015, it was confirmed that TalkTalk would purchase the on-demand entertainment service Blinkbox and broadband business of Tesco for around £5 million. The purchase of Blinkbox was finalised immediately, and the transfer of broadband and home telephone customers was due to be completed by the end of 2015. TalkTalk confirmed it would merge Blinkbox into its existing services.

Also in early 2015, TalkTalk transferred 108,000 broadband customers outside its LLU network to Fleur Telecom, a subsidiary of Daisy Group.

=== 2015 data breach ===
In October 2015, TalkTalk experienced a "significant and sustained cyber-attack", during which personal and banking details of up to four million customers is thought to have been accessed. TalkTalk stated they had received a ransom demand from a group claiming to be responsible. Some customers complained that they were targeted by criminals before TalkTalk disclosed the cyber-attack, and the Chair of the Home Affairs Select Committee said "Suggestions that TalkTalk has covered up both the scale and duration of this attack ... must be thoroughly investigated."

Having initially stated that all its customers might have been affected, on 24 October TalkTalk issued a statement saying that a "materially lower" amount of customers’ financial information was stolen, and that the stolen data was not sufficient for money to be taken from bank accounts. On 6 November, TalkTalk stated that the impact of the breach was "much more limited than initially suspected", adding that 156,959 customer accounts were involved, from which 15,656 sort codes and bank account numbers had been taken. This amounts to 4% of customers whose financial data is compromised. There were 28,000 partial credit and debit cards stolen, but as these were "obscured" they could not be used. TalkTalk stated the lost data had not been encrypted, but they were not legally required to encrypt it.

The attack cost £42m to TalkTalk and 101,000 subscribers left in the aftermath of the attack. On 5 October 2016, TalkTalk was fined £400,000 by the Information Commissioner's Office for its negligence on securing clients data.

=== 2016 malware router infection ===
On 1 December 2016, TalkTalk routers were infected with a modified version of the Mirai malware, leaving hundreds of thousands of customers without Internet access, because of the inability of TalkTalk to keep the routers securely updated. The malware stole the Wi-Fi passwords of the routers. The handling of the Wi-Fi password breach was criticised by several cyber-security experts.

=== Offer by Toscafund ===
On 17 December 2020, Toscafund Asset Management announced that it had sealed a takeover which valued TalkTalk at £1.1 billion, taking it private. Toscafund was previously TalkTalk's second largest shareholder. The transaction was completed in March 2021.

=== Recent history ===
In late 2021, TalkTalk took over the business of internet service provider Origin Broadband after Origin had amassed over £20m in losses. Origin was split into two separate legal entities, Origin Broadband and Origin Broadband Services, and together restructured as OB Telecom.

In March 2022, it was announced that TalkTalk had acquired a London-based provider of high-bandwidth network services, Virtual1.

In July 2022, it was reported that Virgin Media O2 was exploring a bid for the company.

In November 2022, it was announced TalkTalk had acquired a controlling stake in the Horsham-based broadband ISP and products holding company, Telecom Acquisitions Ltd.

In October 2023, TalkTalk Business, a provider of telephone and broadband services to business customers, was demerged from the wider TalkTalk Group and sold to the group's own shareholders.

It was reported in July 2024 that the company was in financial difficulties and struggling to refinance over £1 billion in outstanding borrowings. A successful refinancing, coordinated with A&O Shearman and DNB ASA, was fully agreed and completed before the end of 2024.

On 1 October 2026, The Daily Telegraph reported that competitors were discussing takeover options "to stave off a looming insolvency" of TalkTalk, which might involve national security laws overruling competition concerns. TalkTalk's debts stood at £1.4 billion. TalkTalk collapsed into administration and BT Group agreed to buy its consumer and wholesale businesses out of administration on 5 October 2026.

== Services ==
=== Broadband and fixed-line telephony ===
TalkTalk provides broadband and landline telephone services for private households. The company provides these services generally together in packages, but also separately. Services were also provided under the AOL Broadband brand, which has been used under licence since Carphone Warehouse bought the ISP. AOL Broadband closed to new business in 2014, although some AOL content is available to TalkTalk customers. Customers are also offered "Homesafe", a network-level online security and website blocking system that TalkTalk introduced in 2011. The system is aimed at parents who want to filter web content such as pornography or violence.

=== Television ===
The company is one of seven partners in the television venture YouView and provides IPTV services including access to YouView. It first inherited an IPTV service from the purchase of Tiscali and renamed it TalkTalk TV in January 2010. TalkTalk closed the service to new business that year and in August 2012 introduced its new service including YouView, TalkTalk Plus TV.

=== Mobile telephony ===
In late 2010, TalkTalk launched a mobile telephone service called TalkTalk Mobile (not to be confused with Talkmobile), which operated as a mobile virtual network operator on the Vodafone UK network. TalkTalk have also launched a mobile broadband dongle which allows users to access the Internet on the move although you already need to be an existing TalkTalk customer to sign up to these services.

In 2014, TalkTalk Mobile announced its intention to switch its MVNO from Vodafone to O2.

In January 2018, TalkTalk announced that it will exit the mobile provider space, and began offering its customers reaching the end of their contracts O2 deals instead.

== Advertising ==
The TalkTalk brand was launched with a number of high-profile TV advertisements in 2003, featuring the former public face of BT, Maureen Lipman. TalkTalk's first slogan, "It's good to talk, but it's better to TalkTalk", mocked BT's own "It's good to talk" slogan.

In March 2010, TalkTalk released a parody music video of Home Taping Is Killing Music to protest against the Digital Economy Act 2010. The video features look-alike performers Madonna, George Michael, and Adam Ant. It was created with the help of British songwriter Dan Bull.

In April 2024, Mark Heap was the lead in a series of radio advertisements for TalkTalk written and directed by Rich Johnston and produced by Radioville.

== Sponsorships ==
In 2004 TalkTalk won the sponsorship rights to Big Brother from the UK mobile firm O2. Sponsorship continued until the racism controversy of Celebrity Big Brother 5 after which the company retracted its sponsorship agreement.

TalkTalk began sponsoring The X Factor in 2008, and extended the agreement with ITV plc in May 2013.

== Controversies ==
=== Sales techniques ===
In 2005 TalkTalk was accused of using the practice of telephone slamming (changing consumers' residential phone line over to a new provider without their consent).

In November 2012 the Information Commissioner's Office (ICO) publicly listed TalkTalk as one of a number of companies that it had concerns about due to unsolicited telephone calls for marketing. The concerns were based on complaints. In response, TalkTalk said that it was working with the ICO to address any issues, that the ICO did not plan any enforcement action against it, and that the number of complaints about its telephone marketing calls had fallen.

=== Phorm click-stream analysis ===
In early 2008 it was announced that TalkTalk had entered into an agreement (along with BT and Virgin Media) with the former spyware company Phorm to intercept and analyse their users' click-stream data, and sell the anonymised aggregate information as part of Phorm's OIX advertising service. At the time, TalkTalk confirmed that the new Phorm system, when implemented, would be a strictly opt-in service. In July 2009, Charles Dunstone, CEO of TalkTalk Group announced that TalkTalk had withdrawn plans to introduce Phorm, along with a similar announcement from BT in the same week.

=== URL harvesting ===
On 26 July 2010, The Register reported that TalkTalk had begun harvesting URLs accessed by TalkTalk customers as part of a new anti-malware system it is developing in conjunction with Huawei, the manufacturer of its network servers. When a user accesses a web page, the URL is harvested and the servers issue the same URL request with the intention of checking the site for malicious code. TalkTalk claims that no personally identifiable information is being harvested however, like Phorm, some users argue there are some potential legal issues with this harvesting of information. Under relevant UK legislation, URLs are deemed communications content and interception without permission is prohibited.

=== TalkTalk Ireland ===
TalkTalk briefly offered broadband services in Ireland, but sold their operations to Digiweb.

They had significant service centres for UK customers, inherited from AOL and Toucan, based in Waterford and Sligo. The Sligo centre, originally opened for Toucan, closed in 2010 with the loss of 160 jobs. Some employees were transferred to the centre in Waterford, which at the time was advertising 60 positions.

On 7 September 2011 it was announced that the Waterford call centre would cease operations within 30 days. There was speculation in the Irish press that the jobs would be relocated to Southeast Asia and the UK. The Government of Ireland and its agencies criticised how TalkTalk and its subsidiary TalkTalk Ireland Ltd. dealt with the job losses. The TalkTalk call centre in Waterford closed on 7 October 2011, with the loss of over 570 jobs.

=== Customer service ===
In the past, the company was rated multiple times among the worst landline and broadband providers.

Following a sustained effort to improve customer experiences, the company is now rated comparably to its peers by Which?.
