= David Dyson (businessman) =

British businessman (born 1970)

David Richard Dyson (born 27 April 1970) is the former Chief Executive of Three UK, one of 4 mobile networks operating in the UK.

== Early life ==
He was born in Bury, Lancashire and is now based in Greater Manchester.

== Career ==
He joined Three (the trading name of Hutchison 3G UK) as Chief Financial Officer in 2006, becoming Chief Operating Officer in 2009.

He became Chief Executive on 1 July 2011, replacing Australian Kevin Russell.

On 5 March 2020 in an email to staff he announced he would be stepping down as CEO of Three UK. He will be replaced by Three Ireland CEO Robert Finnegan, who will now hold both roles simultaneously.

== See also ==
- Category:Mobile phone companies of the United Kingdom
- Ronan Dunne, chief executive since 2008 of O2 (United Kingdom)
- Olaf Swantee, chief executive since September 2011 of EE Limited

Business positions
Preceded by Kevin Russell	Chief executive of Three UK; July 2011 – March 2020	Succeeded by Robert Finnegan
Preceded by David Cooper	Chief operating officer of Three UK; 2009 – 2011	Succeeded by Graham Baxter
Preceded by Andrew Moffat	Chief financial officer of Three UK; November 2006 – 2009	Succeeded by Richard Woodward
Preceded by Stephen Gardiner	Chief financial officer of Hutchison Telecommunications Australia; 2002 – 2006	Succeeded by
