= Ronan Dunne =

Irish telecommunications executive

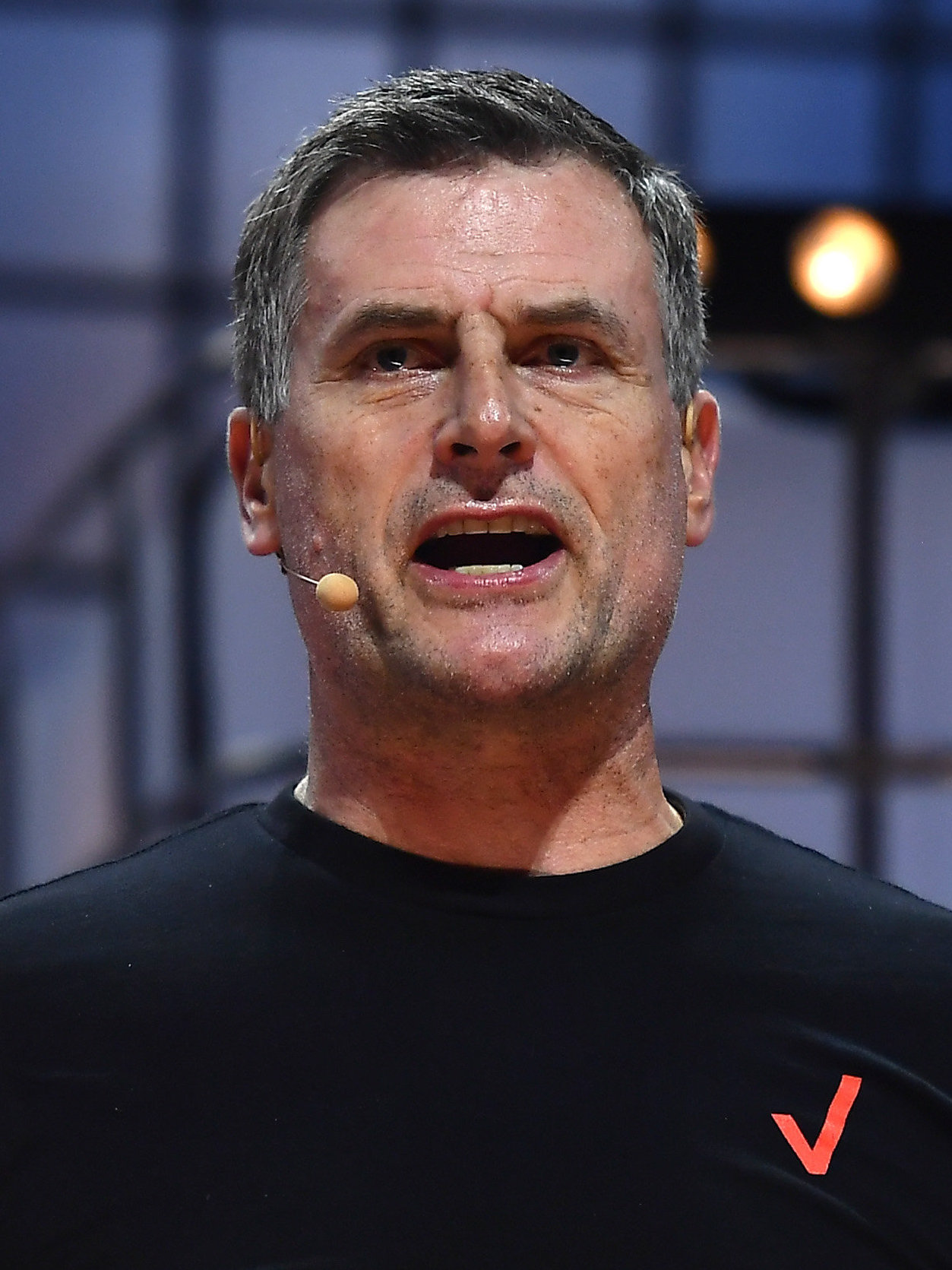
- Dunne at the 2019 Web Summit
- Born: October 31, 1963 (age 62); Dublin, Ireland
- Occupation: Telecommunications executive

Ronan James Dunne (born 31 October 1963) is an Irish telecommunications executive and current Six Nations Rugby Chairman with responsibility for the commercial and marketing operations of tournament.

== Early life ==
He was born in Dublin. He attended Blackrock College in Blackrock, Dublin.

He moved to the UK in 1987.

== Career ==
He had worked with Banque Nationale de Paris, now known as BNP Paribas, from 1987 and with Waste Management International in 1994, and NFC in 1996.

=== O2 ===
He joined O2 in 2001 as deputy to the chief financial officer, becoming chief financial officer in February 2005. O2 was bought by Telefónica in November 2005 for £18bn. BT de-merged from Cellnet in November 2001.

He became CEO of O2 in January 2008. Also in 2008, he was appointed chairman of Tesco Mobile, a joint venture between Telefónica and Tesco.

In July 2016, following O2's failed merger with Hutchison 3G, Dunne stepped down. His 15-year tenure made him the longest-serving CEO in the British telecom industry.

=== Verizon ===
In August 2016, Dunne was hired as the executive vice president and group president of U.S. carrier Verizon Wireless. In 2021, he stepped down.

==== Six Nations Rugby ====
Dunne was appointed as Chairman for Six Nations Rugby with responsibility for the commercial and marketing operations of the men's and women's tournaments in November 2021 with his tenure commencing from January 2022.

== See also ==
- Guy Laurence, chief executive of Vodafone UK
- Olaf Swantee, chief executive of EE Limited

Business positions
| Preceded by Matthew Key | Chief Executive of O2 UK; January 2008 – August 2016 | Succeeded by Mark Evans |
