= Area code 000 =

Invalid telephone area code

000 is not a valid number in any country where dialling '0' reaches an operator.

== North America ==
000 is not a valid area code or prefix in the North American Numbering Plan.

== European Union, and 0 trunk prefix ==
It is invalid in the European Union and many other nations where '0' is reserved as a trunk prefix and '00' as an international call prefix.

== Australia ==
In Australia, 000 is reserved as an emergency telephone number.

== Caller ID presentation ==
This code may show up as part of a number on a caller id system when receiving telemarketer outbound calls or from VoIP services, such as Skype or Vonage, because there is no requirement that caller id data represent a valid telephone number.

== See also ==
- Caller ID spoofing
- 000, Australian emergency telephone number
