= AOL (disambiguation) =

AOL is an American company that invests in brands and web sites.

AOL may also refer to:

== Technology ==
- AOL, abbreviation of aspect-oriented language
- AOL Explorer, a web browser made by AOL
- AOL Broadband, a trading name of TalkTalk Telecom PLC, an Internet service provider in the UK
- Alert on LAN, a PC remote management technology from IBM and Intel

== Entertainment ==
- Zelda II: The Adventure of Link, the second video game in The Legend of Zelda series
- Archers of Loaf, an American indie rock band
- The Angels of Light, a US-based experimental folk-rock group
- The Angels of Light (UK band), an occasional UK-based electronic rock group

== Sports ==
- Academy of Light, Sunderland AFC's training ground
- Amateur Oberliga (football), the fifth tier of German football

== Transport ==
- Paso de los Libres Airport, Corrientes, Argentina, an airport with IATA airport code AOL
- Angkor Airlines, a defunct Cambodian airline with the ICAO airline code AOL
- A US Navy hull classification symbol: Light replenishment oiler (AOL)

== Other ==
- Archives de l'Orient Latin, the early part of the Revue de l'Orient Latin, a collection of medieval documents
- Arrow of Light, the highest award in American Cub Scouting
- Art of Living Foundation, a non-profit, volunteer based organization founded by Sri Sri Ravi Shankar and based in Bangalore, India
