= Truphone =

Global mobile virtual network operator

TP Global Operations Limited
- Type: Private
- Industry: Mobile communications
- Successor: 1GLOBAL (1GLOBAL Group B.V)
- Headquarters: London, U.K.
- Area served: Australia; France; Germany; Hong Kong; Poland; Spain the Netherlands; United Kingdom; United States
- Key people: Hakan Koç (CEO)
- Products: Mobile telecommunications products and services Mobile and desktop software
- Revenue: GBP 47M (2020)
- Number of employees: 500 (2021)
- Subsidiaries: Software Cellular Network Ltd (North America) (in US); Startel Communications Co Pty Ltd (in Australia); SCN Truphone, S.L. (in Spain); Truphone (Hong Kong) Limited (in Hong Kong); Tru Pte Ltd (in Singapore)Truphone (Poland) Sp. z o.o. (in Poland)
- Website: 1global.com

Truphone (now acquired by 1GLOBAL) was a GSMA-accredited global mobile network that operated its service internationally. The company was headquartered in London with offices in ten other countries, being spread across four continents.

Truphone offered eSIM-based GSM mobile services to both businesses and individuals, mobile phone calls and SMS recording services for businesses, remote SIM provisioning and related services, and had a customer base that includes more than 3,500 multinational enterprises in 196 countries.

== History ==
Truphone (a trading name of TP Global Operations Ltd, which acquired the assets of Truphone Ltd, formerly Software Cellular Network Ltd) was founded in 2006 by James Tagg, Alexander Straub and Alistair Campbell.

The company's core business focus was Truphone (launched as Truphone Local Anywhere in January 2010). It was a GSM SIM-based mobile service that provides bundles of minutes, text and data to business customers for use in an area of 66 countries. Truphone called this group of countries Truphone World (Now 1GLOBAL World).

Within this area is a group of countries the company called the Truphone Zone (now 1GLOBAL zone). Here, the company has MVNO partnerships with local operators and offers customers additional local mobile phone numbers. This is so users’ contacts can always reach them with a local call at a local rate.

Truphone was originally formed to develop downloadable mobile VoIP applications for smartphones, using the integrated Wi-Fi connection on the device. These offered the ability to make free or low cost calls on the mobile device in areas where there is weak or no GSM coverage, and to send Instant Messages to other networks in partnership with the multimillion-dollar Air Voice Telecommunications Group.

The first Truphone application released was for Nokia devices. This was followed by applications for Apple iPhone, BlackBerry smartphones, Apple iPod Touch, Android devices and a softphone application for desktop was launched in late 2010.

Truphone's SIM based products were entirely separate from the Apps. In 2012, Truphone had announced the intention to combine the SIM and App accounts for customers in the future, but their App service has since been discontinued.

In 2022, the Federal Communications Commission (FCC) voted to fine Truphone for exceeding foreign ownership limits without FCC approval, noting that Russian oligarch Roman Abramovich and his children indirectly control a stake in the company.

On 24 January 2023, Truphone Limited has sold substantially all assets and subsidiaries to TP Global Operations Limited (1GLOBAL).

In December 2024, German Manager Magazin revealed that Russian oligarchs Abramovich, Abramov, and Frolov, who previously owned 96% of Truphone, might still benefit from 1Global's success. The reason for this is a debtor warrant, which guarantees the former owners further payments in the case of later positive economic performance. This could lead to a situation where, under certain circumstances, such as an IPO, a sum in the triple-digit millions could still flow to the Russian oligarchs. The sanctioned oligarchs might be able to access this money once the sanctions against Russia, imposed due to its attack on Ukraine, are lifted, or if they manage to challenge the freezing of their assets through lawsuits in court.

=== Timeline ===
2006	October: Truphone launches first VoIP application in beta
2007	January: Raises £12.5 ($24.5) million in Series A funding; March: "100 Europe" award from Red Herring magazine; June: Releases new functionality allowing VoIP over 3G and SMS over IP; June: T-Mobile blocked all calls to Truphone numbers.; July: An injunction was issued by a UK court that forces T-Mobile to allow connection to Truphones's mobile numbers
2008	April: Raised £16.5m ($32.7m) of Series B venture capital funding; Acquired SIM4travel; May: Version 4.0 released, incorporating Truphone Anywhere, an automated call-through and call-back application; July: First VoIP application to be available through iTunes for the iPhone; October: Releases Truphone Anywhere application for BlackBerry handsets; December: Releases application for iPod Touch allowing free iPod-to-iPod calling; April: Truphone acquired SIM4travel, a provider of travel SIM cards, for cash and shares, the first foray for Truphone into the GSM industry. Back-end technology from SIM4travel is now used in the Truphone SIM service.
2009	January: Releases application for Android platform; Releases instant messaging capabilities
2010	January: Truphone Local Anywhere (now Truphone SIM) launches; Truphone and Vodafone enter MVNO partnership; Truphone launched the first commercially available VoIP application for the Android; April: Truphone launches on the iPad as the first VoIP application available; June: Truphone announces agreements with Vodafone Netherlands and Orange in Spain; December: Truphone expands its suite of applications to the desktop and laptop; Truphone announces that local rates and numbers are now available in Australia
2011	July: Truphone announces partnership with Obsidian Wireless and demonstrates Truphone Mobile Recording solution; August: Truphone appoints new CEO, Steve Robertson, formerly of BT Openreach; November: Truphone launches Truphone Mobile Recording, to help facilitate banks compliance with Financial Services Authority (now FCA) regulations on mobile call recording
2012	July: Truphone acquires its partner, Obsidian Wireless; August: Truphone opens US headquarters in Research Triangle Park, Raleigh, NC
2013	May: Announces technology partnership with Caterham F1 team; September: Truphone signs deal with BT Global services for the telecoms giant to resell its Truphone Mobile Recording product in the US; November: Truphone launches new operations in Germany, Hong Kong and Poland – is featured on CNBC; October: Shortlisted for the ‘Best MVNO’ at the What Mobile Awards, and ‘Best business communications provider’ at the V3 awards.; December: Truphone opens new offices in New York, NY, and Houston, TX
2014	January: Shortlisted for the GSMA "Global Mobile Awards" best Enterprise Mobile Service and FSTech Awards 2014 "Online/Mobile provider of the year"; February: Won best MVNO at the Telecoms.com awards; March: Shortlisted Most Innovative Telecom Project, Telecom Asia Awards 2014; May: Truphone World’ plan is launched – an extension to the borderless communication zone, to include 66 countries, is featured in CNN, CNBC and Forbes Magazine; June: Won Best customer service in Asia Pacific at the Contact Centre World awards. Announces deal to be the official telecommunications supplier, and sponsor of the Volvo Ocean Race, a round the world sailing event. Announces three year shirt sponsorship deal with Vitesse Arnhem, a football club from the Netherlands Eredivisie; July: Won Best customer service in Europe, Middle East and Africa at the Contact Centre World awards. Won International customer service Training Programme of the Year at the Customer Service Training Awards; November: Won Best Contact Centre Award the Contact Centre World awards.; December: Truphone announced that it had undergone a review of the shape, focus and performance of its business and that following this process its shareholders have committed a funding package of £51 million for 2015. Following this review Truphone initiated a process to streamline and restructure the business to accelerate progress towards profitability.
2016	January: Truphone appoints Ralph Steffens as CEO.
2022	March: The Truphone board mandates FRP Advisory to explore strategic options for the company due to its majority russian shareholder base and exposure to possible UK sanctions.; May: After a strategic review and bidding process, the Truphone board decides to award the bidder group consisting of European technology entrepreneurs Hakan Koç and Pyrros Koussios exclusivity for the sale of its assets and subsidiaries.; August: Truphone's COO Harry Odenhoven is appointed as CEO.; November: Truphone Limited is subject to UK sanctions and operates under a General License issued by the UK Office of Financial Sanctions Implementation (which is revoked in 2023 after the successful sale of its assets).; December: The asset sale to TP Global Operations Limited is approved by the UK Secretary of State for Business, Energy and Industrial Strategy under the NSIA 2021
==== 2023 ====	January: The asset sale to TP Global Operations Limited is approved by the UK Office of Financial Sanctions Implementation (OFSI).; Truphone Limited goes into pre pack administration and sells the majority of its assets and subsidiaries (the Truphone business except any Russia related business or subsidiary) to TP Global Operations Limited (1GLOBAL), a newly founded UK entity which is solely owned by Hakan Koç and Pyrros Koussios.; According to the UK Office of Financial Sanctions Implementation (OFSI), UK sanctions no longer apply to those assets, e.g. the Truphone business.; February: Under new ownership, 1GLOBAL can focus on its core competencies and shows a live demo of the new ESIM Consumer IoT SGP.31 standard at the Mobile World Congress in Barcelona.

== (Past) products and services ==
=== Truphone SIM (Now 1GLOBAL SIM) ===
The Truphone SIM was a standard GSM service with patented technology that allowed customers to have additional phone numbers for any or all of the countries where Truphone had MVNO partnerships with local operators. Currently this included Australia, France, Germany, Hong Kong, Poland, Spain, the Netherlands, United Kingdom and the United States.

The company built a mobile network with core network technology distributed across four continents. Truphone used these local points of presence (POPs) to reduce the distance that mobile traffic has to travel. This reduced latency, improves data speeds and call quality.

Truphone offered local rates for calls, texts and data through commercial arrangements with mobile network operators in 66 countries around the world.

The company focused mainly on the business marketplace, and also has a pre-pay SIM that came with 1 phone number, additional numbers could be purchased for an extra monthly fee (currently $8 per month). Business plans included two phone numbers as standard.

==== Geographical breakdown ====
- Truphone Zone (Now 1GLOBAL zone) Countries where Truphone customers can purchase additional phone numbers, includes: the US, UK, Australia, France, Hong Kong, Netherlands, Germany, Poland and Spain
- Truphone World (Now 1GLOBAL World) Countries where business users' bundles of minutes, texts and data can be used includes: Albania, Andorra, Argentina, Austria, Belarus, Belgium, Bosnia and Herzegovina, Bulgaria, Brazil, Canada, China, Croatia, Cyprus, Czech Republic, Denmark, Estonia, Faroe Islands, Finland, France, French Guiana, Gibraltar, Greece, Guadeloupe, Guernsey, Hungary, Iceland, Ireland, Isle of Man, Israel, Italy, Japan, Jersey, Latvia, Liechtenstein, Lithuania, Luxembourg, Macedonia, Malta, Mexico, Martinique, Mayotte, Monaco, Montenegro, New Zealand, Norway, Portugal, Reunion Island, Romania, Russia, San Marino, Serbia, Singapore, Slovakia, Slovenia, Sweden, Switzerland, Turkey, Ukraine, and Vatican City
- Other countries: Truphone network provides service with higher quality performance in over 220 countries.

=== Truphone Mobile Recording (Now 1GLOBAL for Finance) ===
In addition to the roaming service, Truphone offers mobile call and SMS recording service to financial institutions in the UK and US to comply with the mobile recording legislation from the Financial Conduct Authority, and the Dodd Frank Wall Street Reform Act. The Truphone Mobile Recording service is delivered with its wholly owned subsidiary TruObsidian, an organisation created out of the acquisition of Obsidian Wireless by Truphone in 2012.

==== Features ====
- Local rates in multiple countries
- Bundles of voice minutes, texts and data used across the 66 countries in Truphone World
- Multiple Local Numbers on one mobile / SIM for the eight Truphone Zone countries
- Smart CLI
- Works in over 200 countries (As per the GSMA)
- Call and SMS recording (Optional available for UK, US, Hong Kong and Australia subscribers only)

==== Technology ====
Multi IMSI

The Truphone SIM allows more than one mobile subscriber identity (IMSI) to be added onto the SIM, so a user can have a number for every country Truphone has an MVNO partnership with.

Smart CLI

The Smart Caller Line Identification (Smart CLI) technology ensures that the most appropriate number is displayed on the phone of the person the Truphone user is calling.

Mobile recording

Truphone's voice and SMS recording is integrated within the network infrastructure. Recorded conversations can be stored in the cloud or within the financial institution's existing recording infrastructure. In September 2013, Truphone partnered with BT to market Truphone Mobile Recording service to help firms meet new financial market regulations in the US.

==== Partnerships and MVNO agreements ====
Truphone has MVNO agreements with operators in Australia, Germany, Hong Kong, Poland, Spain, the Netherlands, United Kingdom and the United States. It has additional bi-lateral roaming agreements in place with a wide range of operators around the world .

==== Global mobile network infrastructure ====
Truphone owns and manages its own core mobile technology. The core is connected to global distributed major points of presence using a dedicated high speed internet connection (IP/VPLS). International mobile traffic is routed through the nearest point of presence, this reduction in physical distance reduces call interference and latency, and increases data throughput.

My Truphone App

Truphone was the first carrier in the world to launch an eSIM enabled app in the APP store in November 2018.

Known as My Truphone, the app allows compatible Apple iPhone eSIMs to download a sim over the air mapped to Truphone's travel plan.

Truphone's old VoIP application (known as Truphone App), was a separate product to the Tru SIM, allowing users to make calls over the internet to landline and mobile phone contacts, and free calls to other Truphone App users. Customers were also able to instant message contacts on other networks, such as Skype or Windows Live on selected devices.

The application also had additional user experience enhancements including:

- ‘call cost indicator’ that advises the per minute cost before a call is placed
- signal strength checker
- photo led contacts book
- instant Messaging

The application was available as a free download and worked on the following devices:

- Mobile devices:
  - Apple iPhone, iPod Touch, iPad; however, user reviews on Apple's App Store report that the Tru App does not work correctly with iOS 5.
  - BlackBerry smartphones (calls via WI-FI for BB not supported)
  - Mobile phones with Android OS
  - Nokia smartphones
- Desktops and laptops:
  - Computers with Apple Mac OS, Windows and Linux

The app was also in development for Windows Phone 8.

Text messages could be sent from Tru app versions for the iPhone, iPod Touch, iPad and Nokia; as well as Apple Mac OS, Windows and Linux. Note as of the release of TruApp version 5 (in October/November 2012), text messaging functionality was removed from the iOS app and TruApp for iPad was removed from the Apple App Store altogether.

Tru App supported a range of calling methods: calls over wired or wireless internet on Windows, Mac and Linux. It supported calls over Wi-Fi, 3G and call-through, depending on the platform. Call-through was called Tru Anywhere, which used the local minutes of the user to connect the call to a local Tru server. The BlackBerry application from Tru uses this method of calling only.

Truphone applications used the Session Initiation Protocol open standard, that competes with other VoIP standards such as UMA and proprietary protocols such as the Skype protocol.

It has been suggested that internet-based communications could be used without fear of interception. Truphone maintained, however, that it is governed by and complies with the same 'lawful intercept' laws as every other telecommunications company.

In September 2016, Truphone announced that the Truphone App would close on Monday, 21 November 2016. According to an email to its user base from Director of Service & Operations, Paula Booth, Truphone "took this hard decision to allow us focus on our core business".

[ Update per website 2023-12-22 ]

Due to changes in payment systems, consumer prepaid service top-ups are no longer supported; after 180 days of no usage such accounts are terminated.

Consumer services may currently be limited to data plans, on certain recent smart-phones, smart-watches, and smart-tablets.

Enterprise: "We're delighted to share that 1GLOBAL has successfully acquired Truphone."

== See also ==
- List of mobile network operators in the United Kingdom
- List of United States mobile phone companies
- List of mobile network operators in Australia
- Mobile virtual network operator
