= International direct dialing =

International telephone calling

International direct dialing (IDD) or international subscriber dialling (ISD) is placing an international telephone call, dialed directly by a telephone subscriber, rather than by a telephone operator. Subscriber dialing of international calls typically requires an international call prefix (international dial-out code, international direct dial code, IDD code) to be dialed before the country code.

The term international subscriber dialling was used in the United Kingdom and Australia until the terminology was changed to international direct dialling. Since the late 20th century, most international calls are dialed directly.

Calls are initiated by dialing the international call prefix for the originating country, followed by the country calling code for the destination country, and finally the national telephone number of the destination. For example, a landline subscriber in the UK wishing to call Australia would first dial the following sequence: 00 (the call prefix used in the UK to access the international service), followed by 61 (the country calling code for Australia), followed by the national subscriber number (without the trunk prefix 0 used for dialing within Australia).

== International call prefix ==
An "international call prefix", "international dial-out code" or "international direct dial code" (IDD code) is a trunk prefix that indicates an international phone call. In the dialling sequence, the prefix precedes the country calling code (and, further, the carrier code, if any, and the destination telephone number).

The international call prefix is defined in the telephone numbering plan of every country or telephone administration. The International Telecommunication Union (ITU) recommendation E.164 specifies the sequence 00 as a standard for the international call prefix and this has been implemented by the majority of countries. Member countries of the North American Numbering Plan (NANP) use 011. Certain post-Soviet states continue to use 810 which was the universal IDD code across the Soviet Union. Other prefixes (000, 001, 0011, 119, etc.) are also in use in a small number of countries.

Some countries require that the prefix 00 is followed immediately by the so-called carrier selection code, i.e., a numeric code that routes the call via a specific provider for international connectivity. Some countries may require that any carrier selection codes precede the international call prefix.

Some countries also offer simplified dialling arrangements for calls to neighbouring countries, usually by removing the need of dialling an international call prefix and the country code.

To avoid confusion especially in international context, a plus sign (+) is often used as a graphic symbol of the international access code; it informs the caller to replace it with the prefix code appropriate for their country.

== Example ==
The fictitious telephone number (02) 3456 7890, as published locally in Sydney, Australia, is published in the form +61 2 3456 7890 for international use. In countries participating in the North American Numbering Plan, such as the United States or Canada, this number is dialed as 011 61 2 3456 7890, with 011 being the international call prefix in the NANP and 61 being the country code of Australia. From most of the rest of the world, the international access code is 00, so that the call is dialed as 00 61 2 3456 7890, as recommended by the ITU standards.

== See also ==
- List of international call prefixes
- List of telephone country codes
