= Mobile by Sainsbury's =

British mobile virtual network operator

- Company type: Subsidiary of Sainsbury's
- Industry: Telecommunications
- Founded: 1 July 2013
- Defunct: 15 January 2016
- Fate: Ceased operations
- Headquarters: United Kingdom
- Area served: United Kingdom
- Products: Mobile telecommunications products and services
- Parent: Sainsbury's
- Website: www.sainsburys.co.uk

Mobile by Sainsbury's was a mobile virtual network operator (MVNO) in the UK, operated by Sainsbury's between July 2013 and January 2016, using the Vodafone UK network.

Sainsbury's operated an earlier mobile virtual network that was launched in 2001 but only lived until 2003. Their second iteration, Mobile by Sainsbury's, launched in July 2013, following similar launches by supermarket rivals Tesco and Asda. In October 2015, Sainsbury's announced that it would close the service on 15 January 2016.

== History ==
On 18 October 2000, Sainsbury's announced that they would be launching a new MVNO in the UK, called Sainsbury's One, which would be using the BT Cellnet network (which became O2 in 2002). It would offer the lowest prices in a 'Rate and Compare' customer strategy. The service commenced on 2 January 2001. The 'One' brand name was later dropped.

Sainsbury's Mobile ended up in a commercial failure. In autumn 2002, Sir Peter Davis admitted in a letter written to a complaining customer that the standard of service had not been of the standard expected. Near the end of its lifetime it only managed to gain 60,000 subscribers, and one of its partners, Mosaic Group Inc., became defunct. On 18 July 2003, Sainsbury's announced that its mobile customers will be transferred to O2's tariffs, marking the end of Sainsbury's mobile virtual network. Two months later in September 2003, rival supermarket Tesco launched its Tesco Mobile network.

On 23 September 2008, it was reported that Sainsbury's was to launch a mobile network again. Three years later on 28 October 2011, Sainsbury's got the go-ahead and was close to sealing a deal with a network operator. After several delays, the new Mobile by Sainsbury's service was announced on 1 July 2013 in a partnership with Vodafone UK. The service launched on 24 July 2013.

In February 2014 a new set of bundles were launched reducing the costs of the 2 larger bundles, increasing the minutes available for the 2 cheapest tariffs, and doubling the amount of data available.

Mobile By Sainsbury's SIM cards were available in most local and large supermarkets, together with a range of handsets in over 300 stores. Sainsbury's started opening standalone phone shops in its large stores in 2012.

On 13 October 2015, Mobile by Sainsbury's ceased accepting new SIM card orders before closing down permanently on 15 January 2016. Sainsbury's continues to sell a range of branded networks in its larger stores.

== Plans ==
=== SIM only price plans ===
- £8 for 300 minutes, unlimited texts, and 500MB data
- £10 for 500 minutes, unlimited texts, and 1GB data
- £12 for 800 minutes, unlimited texts, and 2GB data

=== Bundles ===
- £10 for 300 minutes, unlimited texts, and 500MB data
- £12.50 for 500 minutes, unlimited texts, 1GB data
- £15 for 800 minutes, unlimited texts, and 2GB data

=== Rolling Bundles ===
- £8 for 300 minutes, unlimited texts, 500 MB data
- £10 for 500 minutes, unlimited texts, 1 GB data
- £12 for 800 minutes, unlimited texts, 2 GB data

Customers could choose to have "rolling bundles" where bundles were automatically renewed at a 20% discount. All plans came with double Nectar points on Sainsbury's shopping and fuel for the 30-day life of the bundle, and a family of four could link their phone accounts to the same loyalty card; Sainsbury's claimed a family of four could earn £180 in Nectar points per year.

=== Standard rates ===
- 8p/minute
- 4p/text
- 5p/1MB

All came with Nectar points when topping up.

== Coverage ==
Mobile by Sainsbury's operated using Vodafone's network.

== Marketing ==
Initial marketing was handled by Cake, who pitched the service at mothers and families, seeking to play on Sainsbury's status as a trusted brand.

== Reception ==
Cable.co.uk were critical of the poor value for money offered and Sainsbury's lack of experience in mobile phones, while praising the coverage and offer of emergency credit. This review was before the new bundles launched in February 2014.
