= Allera =

Allera is a surname. Notable people with the surname include:

- Francis Allera (born 1985), Filipino basketball player
- Marc Allera (born 1972), CEO of EE Limited
