= Smarty (wireless carrier) =

UK communications brand

Hutchison 3G UK Limited

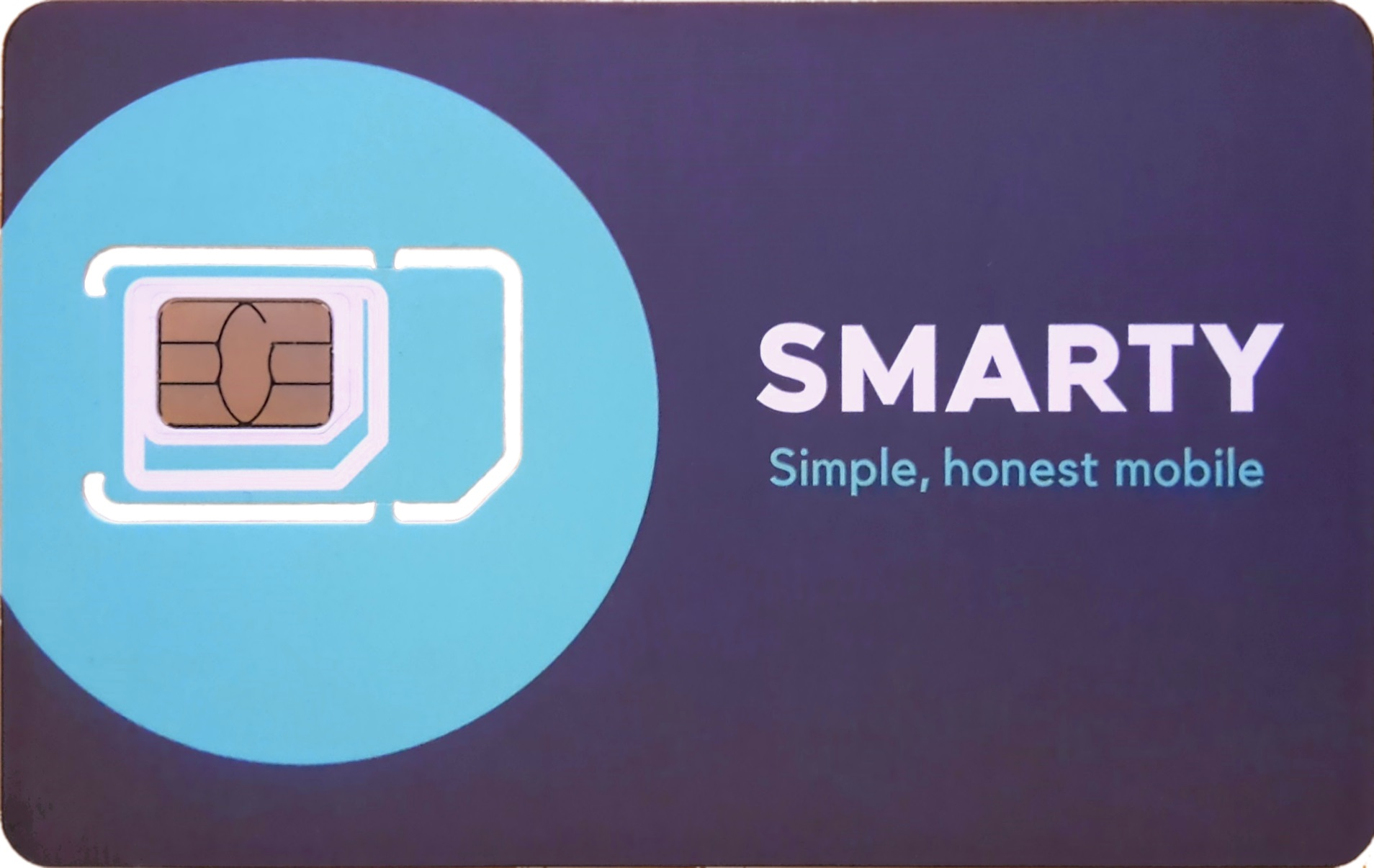
- SIM card from SMARTY
- Trade name: SMARTY
- Type: Subsidiary
- Industry: Telecommunications
- Founded: 31 August 2017; 9 years ago
- Headquarters: Reading, England
- Area served: United Kingdom
- Key people: Elin McLean, General Manager
- Products: Mobile telecommunications products and services
- Parent: Three UK (VodafoneThree)
- Website: www.smarty.co.uk

SMARTY is a mobile telephone flanker brand operated by Three UK. It aims to attract customers primarily looking for cheaper deals than those available direct from Three, by offering a monthly rolling SIM-only service, limited to online-only support. On some plans the operator offers to buy back unused data by means of a bill discount, a practice which is not widespread in the UK but is exhibited elsewhere such as by US carrier Ting Mobile.

== Tariffs ==
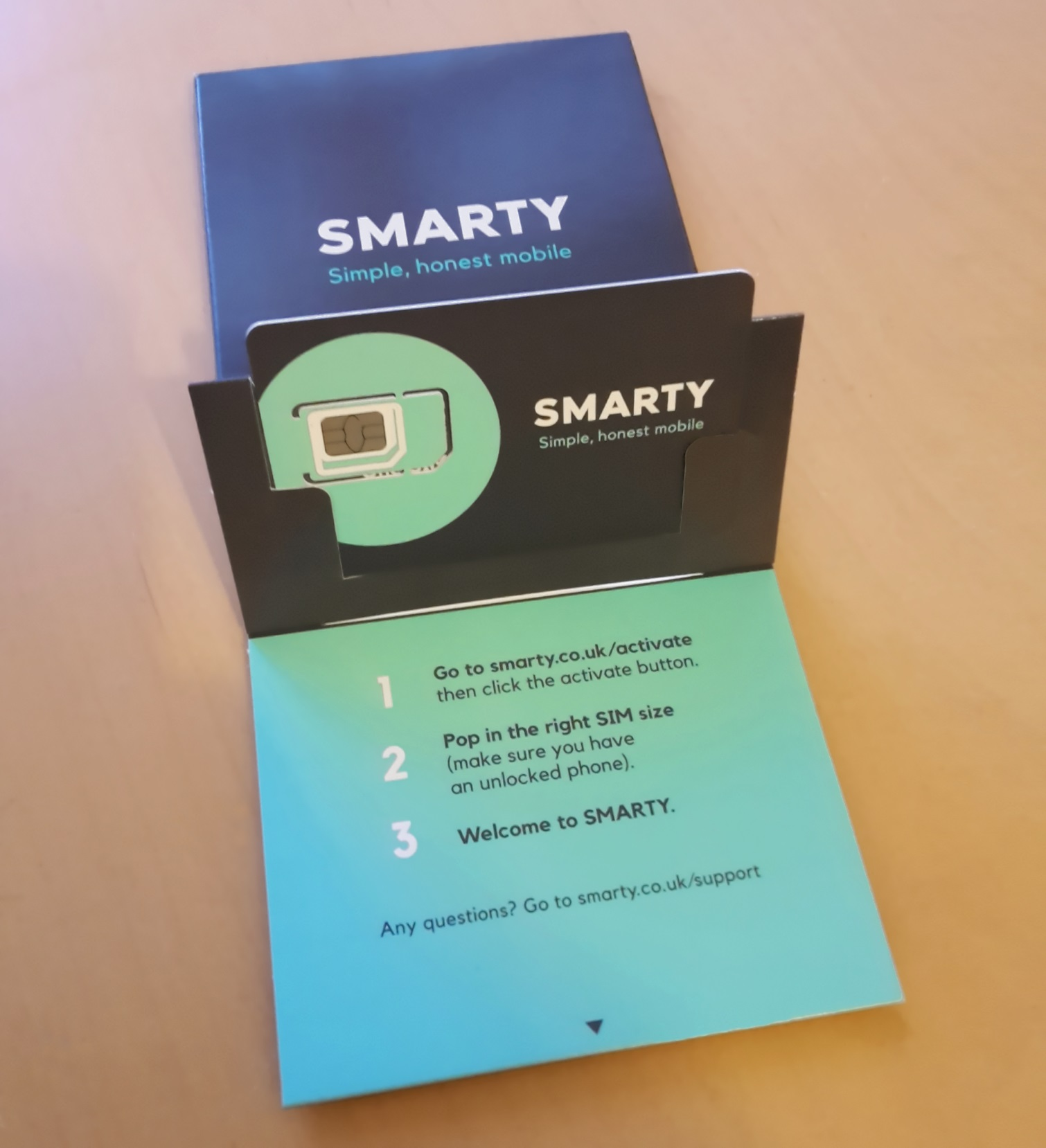
SIM card package from SMARTY

All plans are monthly, with no contract, and are paid in advance by credit card, debit card, or cash via PayPoint, rather than via the more prevalent direct debit method. The company states that no credit checks are made.

All plans (excluding data only plans) include unlimited UK calls and texts. In common with other networks, SMARTY offers a fixed amount of mobile data (or an unlimited amount) for a fixed monthly payment. It also offers "data discount" plans, where the customer pays a £5 per month service charge and buys a small number of gigabytes of data. Under these plans, customers who do not use all their data allowance receive a credit on their next month's bill for unused data, calculated per megabyte at the same price as they paid for it. This credit for unused data is unique among UK mobile operators, as is the unified price of data add-ons; 1 GB of data is priced the same, regardless of whether it is bought in advance as part of a customer's monthly rolling plan, or bought as an add-on which is consumed only when a customer's monthly allowance is used up. In this respect, the data discount plans are functionally equivalent to standard pay-as-you-go (PAYG) tariffs offered by other providers, such as Three's own PAYG offering, since customers only pay for the exact amount of data that they use.

Upon launch, SMARTY offered hotspot and tethering functionality, although they did not offer the ability to call foreign numbers, roam abroad, or dial premium numbers. These features became available in 2018.

In early 2018, SMARTY launched a refer-a-friend scheme. If a customer refers a friend, both would get a free month on SMARTY. There were no limits to this, so if a customer refers one friend a month they would keep their mobile bill free. In 2022, this offer was replaced with a £10 gift card for both customers.

In 2022, SMARTY rolled out data only plans which do not include any calls or texts, unlike their other plans. There are a range of plans available from 2GB per month up to an unlimited data plan.

== Network ==
SMARTY is 'Hutchison 3G UK Limited, trading as SMARTY.' It is a mobile virtual network operator (MVNO) on the Three UK network. SMARTY state that there are no speed restrictions or throttling on the network, and SMARTY is not subject to Three's TrafficSense traffic management approach. 4G calling (VoLTE) and Wi-Fi calling (VToW) are enabled on SMARTY, using the same protocol as Three's Wi-Fi calling service and available on the same devices as Three. 5G service is available in areas where Three has 5G coverage.
