= AOL Broadband =

TalkTalk Telecom Limited (trading as AOL Broadband)
- Type: Limited
- Industry: Telecommunications
- Headquarters: London, England, UK
- Key people: Charles Dunstone, Chairman
- Products: Broadband Internet access
- Parent: TalkTalk Group

AOL Broadband was a UK internet service provider and part of the TalkTalk Group.

== History ==
The Carphone Warehouse announced that it would purchase the UK business of AOL on 10 October 2006 for £370m, making it the third largest broadband provider, with over 2 million customers, and the largest LLU operator, with more than 150,000 LLU customers. The acquisition process completed on 9 December 2006. A press release stated that AOL UK Audience business will remain a separate organization and brand with a revenue sharing agreement. The AOL UK Access business (broadband) was changed to AOL Broadband. The deal included an agreement to continue customers access to the AOL portal content.

AOL began consulting on job cuts in 2006. The Times reported that the company expected to cut a total of 500 UK jobs by Christmas. In line with legal requirements, AOL UK (now AOL Broadband) notified the DTI that redundancies are planned. The Press Gazette stated "The company has informed the DTI that it is possible that it will make more than 100 redundancies".

On 1 November 2006, it was made public that Karen Thompson, AOL UK CEO and President of AOL Europe, had resigned and had been succeeded by Carlo d'Asaro Biondo (previously CEO of AOL France). Thompson was part of the team responsible for launching AOL UK in 1996.

It was made public on 14 December 2006 that Carlo d'Asaro Biondo had resigned after six weeks in his new role. Philip Rowley (the chairman of AOL Europe) has taken over on a temporary basis. The Guardian states: the management turmoil has put the European operation in "freefall" and created a "massive vacuum", according to one AOL insider. The same article estimates that 5,000 AOL jobs are to go worldwide (25% of staff) with a significant number from AOL UK.

In January 2007 AOL UK was rebranded as AOL Broadband.

In an early press statement, The Carphone Warehouse stated they had "no plans to change the service in any way at all," but, since January, all those who used P2P applications heavily had their downstream bandwidth limited to 50 kbit/s during peak times (18:00–24:00, Sunday to Thursday).

During the third quarter of 2007, AOL Broadband caused a stir by offering a free laptop computer (and eventually a free PlayStation 3) to all new customers signing up for a 24-month contract with its AOL Broadband Wireless Plus broadband package.

Services are provided by TalkTalk Group under the AOL Broadband brand.

In April 2013 AOL Broadband was 'rated worst for broadband problems' by Which? Magazine.

By April 2014, AOL Broadband was no longer available for new customers. Potential new customers are directed to the TalkTalk website for broadband packages.
