= Three UK =

British communications provider

Hutchison 3G UK Limited
- Trade name: Three UK
- Type: Limited company
- Industry: Telecommunications
- Founded: 3 March 2003; 23 years ago
- Founder: Hutchison Whampoa
- Headquarters: Reading, Berkshire, England, UK
- Number of locations: 293 stores
- Area served: United Kingdom
- Key people: Max Taylor (CEO)
- Products: Mobile telephony; Broadband internet
- Brands: SMARTY
- Services: Broadband and Mobile
- Revenue: ▲£2,590 million (FY 2023)
- Number of employees: 4,800
- Parent: VodafoneThree
- Website: www.three.co.uk

Hutchison 3G UK Limited, trading as Three UK, is a British telecommunications company based in Reading, Berkshire, England. It is a part of VodafoneThree, a subsidiary of Vodafone. It is the smallest of the four mobile network operators in the United Kingdom, with about 10.9 million subscribers as of November 2024, behind fellow VodafoneThree subsidiary Vodafone UK.

The service was launched by CK Hutchison Holdings on 3 March 2003 as the UK's first commercial 100% 3G network. It provides 4G and 5G services through its own network infrastructure. In June 2023, it was proposed that Three would merge with Vodafone UK. The merger was approved by the Competition and Markets Authority in December 2024 and completed in June 2025. CK Hutchison agreed in May 2026 to sell its whole stake in the business to Vodafone Group and the transaction completed on 30 July 2026, making VodafoneThree a wholly owned subsidiary of Vodafone Group.

== History ==
The Three mobile service was launched in the UK on 3 March 2003, with handsets going on sale later that year. Three was the UK's first commercial video mobile (3G) network. The company was a subsidiary of Hong Kong's CK Hutchison Holdings.

Three was the first network to meet its regulatory requirement of 80% population coverage in the UK, reaching this goal by 9 December 2004.

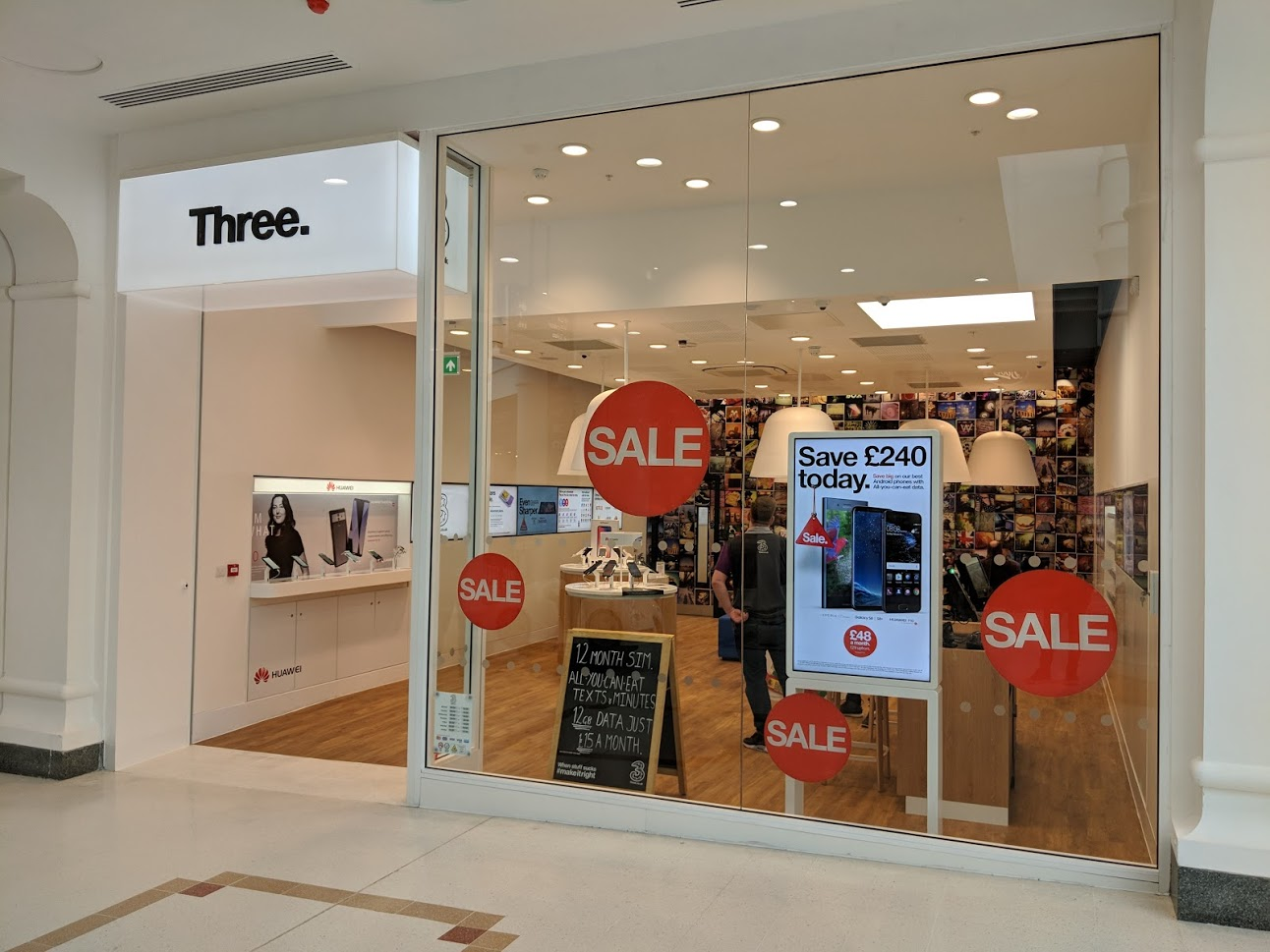
A Three store in Royal Tunbridge Wells, England

Three's first retail shops, called 3Store, opened at the same time as the network launched, on Oxford Street and Kensington High Street, both in London, and at the Birmingham Mailbox. Three also sold handsets, devices and contracts through independent and online retailers at the time. In 2005, Three expanded, and stores opened in larger shopping centres throughout the UK. On 24 October 2006, Three announced that it had purchased 95 high street shops from O2 and The Link.

Three launched SeeMeTV, allowing its customers to submit their own video content that other subscribers could watch. Users would make a small micropayment (the price decided by the video's creator) to watch these videos. The user who created the videos would get paid 10% of the amount of money paid by other users to watch the video. Users were paid once they had accrued £10.

In 2010, Three became the fourth network in the UK to launch the iPhone 4 after O2, Orange and Vodafone.

In July 2014, Three introduced the 3 inTouch app, allowing customers to place calls through a Wi-Fi connection. Three customers can also access the Virgin Wi-Fi network implemented at over 130 London Underground stations.

On 24 March 2015, Three's parent company Hutchison Whampoa announced it intended to acquire the UK operations of rival mobile network O2 for £10.25 billion, subject to regulatory approval. On 11 May 2016, EU commission blocked the deal on the grounds that it would affect competition in the UK market.

In November 2016, three men were arrested after a data breach at the Three mobile network allowed fraudsters to access personal data and steal phones. The company said that while names and addresses were accessed, some financial information might be compromised. Fraudsters were understood to have used authorised login information to order upgraded phones, including iPhone and Samsung handsets, to be sent to customers before intercepting them. Three, which had 9 million customers, said it believed around 400 phones had been stolen.

In early 2020, CEO of Three UK, Dave Dyson, resigned after nine years at the helm. He was replaced by Three Ireland's CEO, Robert Finnegan, who now manages both companies.

Three was the main shirt sponsor of Premier League club Chelsea since the 2020–21 season. On 10 March 2022 Three announced it was ending its sponsorship deal with Chelsea immediately, and asked the club to remove the company's logo from its kits.

== Network ==
In order to provide coverage parity with other networks in the UK, Three maintained for a time a national roaming agreement with an established 2G network operator. O2 operated this service for Three customers at first, until Orange was selected as the new national roaming partner from May 2006.

In the early period of the 3G network, Orange 2G (acquired by EE in 2010) was adopted in areas as a fallback where 3G wasn't available. In 2010, this fallback coverage began to be removed, meaning older phones that supported only 2G lost access to the Three network. From 2013, Three no longer provided a significant 2G fallback for most of the United Kingdom.

In December 2007, T-Mobile and Three launched a 50:50 joint venture called Mobile Broadband Network Limited (MBNL) which aimed to combine both of their 3G networks and provide almost-complete 3G population coverage by the end of 2008. In November 2010, MBNL announced that the network had reached a total of 12,000 combined sites.

In 2022, Three announced its intention to decommission its 3G network by the end of 2024. A study in October 2024 found that Three's decision to switch off its 3G network improved overall data speeds but reduced network coverage in some areas.

=== 4G ===
Three's 4G Ready logo

Three began a limited rollout of 4G LTE services in December 2013 in London, Birmingham, Manchester and Reading, expanding to over a further 450 locations by the end of 2014. In August 2012, Three was given permission to use part of the 1,800 MHz spectrum used by EE's 4G network. In February 2013, Ofcom announced that Three had been awarded 2 x 5 MHz (10 MHz) of 800 MHz to use for 4G. Three planned to launch 4G in the second quarter of 2013 but it delayed the rollout until Q4, saying that it wanted to analyse the performance of other networks' 4G coverage first. The network provides LTE and DC-HSDPA service as a standard feature to all its subscribers using "Ultrafast" to describe both technologies, making it (at the time) the cheapest price for 4G and the only unlimited 4G in the UK. In April 2015, Three announced that VoLTE would be rolled out along with 800 MHz spectrum from September.

=== Network upgrades ===
In November 2018, Three UK announced a £2 billion investment programme to support the rollout of 5G across its network. This included the acquisition of spectrum for 5G by buying Relish Broadband to gain 40Mhz of spectrum across the 3.4 GHz, 3.6 GHz and 3.9 GHz bands. Furthermore, it involved the creation of a dark fibre network to connect 20 new data centres, alongside deploying carrier aggregation across 2,500 sites, improving performance on 4G.

=== Roaming at domestic prices ===
"Go Roam" countries and territories where Three UK customers can roam at UK domestic prices (2021)

Until 2009, Three subscribers in the UK, Ireland, Austria, Italy, Denmark, Sweden, Hong Kong and Australia could use their service on Three networks around the world for no extra charge with "3 Like Home". The service was relaunched on 30 August 2013 as "Feel At Home" for UK customers visiting Australia, Austria, Denmark, Hong Kong, Ireland, Italy and Sweden, where calls, texts and data could be consumed without roaming charges; meaning they cost the same as for communication within the UK. Additional countries were subsequently added to "Feel At Home" including Finland, France, Indonesia, Israel, Macau, New Zealand, Norway, Spain, Sri Lanka, Switzerland and the United States. The service was expanded to a further 24 European countries in September 2016. Three changed the name of its roaming proposition from "Feel at Home" to "Go Roam", which now covers 59 countries and territories since 2017. Three advertises that the service covers "71 destinations" because it counts several countries more than once. For example, Three counts "Ireland" and "Republic of Ireland" as two destinations, counts Åland in addition to Finland, counts two parts of Spain in addition to Spain, counts two parts of Portugal in addition to Portugal, and counts eight parts of France in addition to France. "Go Roam" only covers roaming, and does not include non-roaming services such as international calls made from the UK.

Three UK changed its terms and conditions in September 2021. Customers acquiring new contracts or updates after that date will no longer have "Go Roam" free of charge. This benefit costs £2 per day for roaming in EU countries (except Ireland) and £5 per day when roaming outside the EU.

=== Frequency allocations ===
Frequencies used by the Three UK network
Frequency	Band	Protocol	Class
2,100 MHz	B1 n1	LTE/LTE Advanced; 5G NR	4G/4G+ 5G
1,800 MHz	B3	LTE/LTE Advanced	4G/4G+
800 MHz	B20	LTE/LTE Advanced	4G/4G+
700 MHz	B28 n28	LTE/LTE Advanced; 5G NR	4G/4G+ 5G
1,500 MHz	B32	LTE Advanced	4G+
3,700 MHz	n77	5G NR	5G (unused)
3,500 MHz	n78	5G NR	5G

=== Virtual operators ===
The Three network is used by a number of mobile virtual network operators (MVNOs).

In May 2015, Dixons Carphone launched its iD Mobile network.

In August 2017, Three UK launched its SMARTY network.

In June 2018, Three UK and Superdrug (another CK Hutchison company) launched the Superdrug Mobile network.

== SMARTY ==
In August 2017, Three launched a no frills SIM-only brand called SMARTY to compete against O2's giffgaff and Vodafone's VOXI.

Unlike Three, which offers telephone support, SMARTY instead opted to only offer live chat, community forums and help pages; the live chat service is provided by Three UK customer support teams. Instead of fixing customers into a contract, SMARTY offers a rolling 30-day contract, allowing customers to cancel at any time. They offer free EU roaming and MMS. Furthermore, SMARTY does not complete credit checks, making it an option for people with a poor credit score. In September 2025, SMARTY introduced eSIM to its customers.

From 2019 to 2024, SMARTY won a number of Best PAYG Network and Best Value SIM Only awards from comparison service uSwitch.

== Controversies ==
In November 2025, the Competition Appeal Tribunal (CAT) approved a class action claim in the UK from consumer rights expert Justin Gutmann to take Three and other mobile network operators to trial. The claim alleges that long standing customers were charged for their mobile phones beyond their contractual terms. Gutmann is representing 10.9 million contracts that were affected between 1 October 2015 and 31 March 2025. If successful, it could see Three and other operators, pay over £1.1 billion in damages, roughly equating to £104 per contract. Mobile networks, including Three, deny any wrongdoing.
