= VodafoneThree =

British telecommunications company

VodafoneThree Holdings Limited
- Type: Subsidiary
- Industry: Telecommunications
- Founded: 31 May 2025; 16 months ago
- Headquarters: Newbury, Berkshire, England, UK
- Area served: United Kingdom
- Key people: Max Taylor (CEO); Darren Purkis (CFO)
- Parent: Vodafone Group Plc
- Subsidiaries: Vodafone UK; Three UK
- Website: www.vodafonethree.com

VodafoneThree Holdings Limited is a British telecommunications company. It was formed on 30 May 2023 as a company, and on 31 May 2025 as a joint venture between Vodafone (51%) and CK Hutchison Holdings (49%) through the merger of their respective Vodafone UK and Three UK businesses. As of August 2026, VodafoneThree is 100% fully owned by Vodafone Group Plc.

== History ==
In 2023, Vodafone UK struck a deal with Three UK to merge their UK businesses, subject to approval by the Competition and Markets Authority (CMA). The combined company would, at that time, have had 27 million customers, making them the largest mobile network in the UK, surpassing O2, which had 24 million customers, and EE, which had 20 million. The deal gave Vodafone Group a 51% stake in the new business with CK Hutchison owning the remaining 49%. Vodafone had an option to buy out Hutchison's stake, three years after completion of the merger.

Vodafone stated that the deal would lead to £11bn of investment into 5G over the next 10 years. Consumer group Which? and others raised concerns that the merger would risk lowering the quality of service and increasing prices due to less competition being present.

From January to March 2024, the CMA conducted a Phase 1 investigation of the deal and concluded that the merger could result in a substantial lessening of competition, noting that it could raise prices for consumers and businesses and reduce investment in mobile network quality. The CMA gave both parties five days to provide a sufficient remedy to these concerns before they began an in-depth Phase 2 investigation.

In December 2024, the CMA approved the merger subject to legally binding commitments to 5G rollout and consumer price protection measures. The merger completed in June 2025, and the company announced a £11 billion investment in the UK over the next decade.

Analysts noted that the merger could lead to improved 5G coverage and better infrastructure investment, but concerns remained about reduced competition potentially leading to higher prices. Reports suggest that the consolidation may also affect mobile virtual network operators (MVNOs) that rely on Three and Vodafone's networks, potentially altering pricing structures and service offerings for budget-conscious consumers.

In February 2026, VodafoneThree announced that Three would leave their headquarters in Reading and move to Vodafone's headquarters in Newbury by the end of the year.

In April 2026, VodafoneThree announced that they would start to combine their store estate: the stores would offer products and support for both Vodafone and Three brands, and there would be closures where there was duplication.

In May 2026, CK Hutchison Holdings agreed to sell their 49% stake to Vodafone Group for £4.3bn, subject to regulatory approval, to allow Vodafone Group to become the sole owner of the company. The transaction completed on 30 July 2026.

== Operations ==
Vodafone and Three are together the largest mobile network operator in the United Kingdom, with approximately 28 million subscribers combined.

While Vodafone and Three continue to operate as distinct networks and brands, customers are expected to be able to access a shared network within six months of the merger, with some of this work having already been completed. Once fully operational, the company would surpass O2 as the UK's largest mobile network by customer base.
