= Family Mobile =

2008–2015 British mobile virtual network operator

Family Mobile by Coms
- Type: N/A
- Industry: Telecommunications
- Founded: 8 August 2008, 18 years ago (as IKEA Family Mobile)
- Defunct: 31 August 2015, 11 years ago
- Fate: Ceased operations
- Headquarters: United Kingdom
- Area served: United Kingdom
- Key people: N/A
- Products: Mobile telecommunications products and services
- Parent: Timico
- Website: www.familymobile.co.uk

Family Mobile was a mobile virtual network operator (MVNO) in the United Kingdom that was operated by Coms Mobile and used the EE network. Originally launched as IKEA Family Mobile on 8 August 2008, it offered pay as you go SIM cards to the public, with members of its loyalty programme and all 9,500 IKEA staff in Britain presented with a handset and £5 worth of free calls.

Family Mobile offered UK calls for 8p per minute and UK text messages for 4p each, with a minimum initial top up of £10, making the network the cheapest pay as you go operator in the UK at time of launch – "at least 25 per cent cheaper than any other comparable prepay offer"; and as of May 2012, Family Mobile was still the cheapest pay as you go UK network. The service targeted individual users families, with extra features for the latter, allowing customers a number of SIM cards per account with shared credit shared among family members and the ability to cap each user. A free standalone SIM card or handset with their SIM card could be ordered at the Family Mobile website.

Other notable features included automatic top-ups, online itemised bills and the ability to manually switch to the Orange Network if no T-Mobile signal is available by chaining relevant phone settings.

In June 2015, the operator announced that its services would cease to operate from 31 August 2015, resulting in the network's closure.
