= Ovivo Mobile =

OVIVO Mobile Communications
- Company type: Private
- Industry: Telecommunications
- Area served: United Kingdom
- Key people: Dariush Zand (Founder, CEO)
- Products: Mobile telecommunications
- Website: oviomobile.com at the Wayback Machine (archived 2013-04-02)

OVIVO Mobile was a mobile virtual network operator (MVNO) in the United Kingdom, using the Vodafone UK network as its carrier. OVIVO was unique in the UK in offering a free (£0 monthly fee) advertising-funded mobile tariff, which was financed by showing an advert in the user's web browser. They charged a nominal fee to cover admin and initial SIM setup costs, returning a portion as user credit upon activation.

OVIVO raised £414,000 in exchange for 25.48% equity via crowdfunding site Crowdcube.

The service closed down on Wednesday, 19 March 2014 without prior notice.

The firm's Twitter and Facebook accounts were deactivated the same day, and email attempts were bounced back.

There was a report that a dispute over network software led to the abrupt closure of the network.

The Ovivo website posted a warning to visitors that the website would be shut down on 10 April. The website and the ability to claim a PAC was taken down in June 2014.
