= Talkmobile =

British mobile virtual network operator

- Industry: Telecommunications
- Founded: 2007
- Headquarters: Newbury, Berkshire, England, UK
- Area served: United Kingdom
- Products: Mobile telecommunications
- Parent: Vodafone UK
- Website: talkmobile.co.uk

Talkmobile is a mobile virtual network operator (MVNO) operating in the United Kingdom on the Vodafone network. As a brand owned by Vodafone, the business is based in Newbury, Berkshire, England.

== History ==
Launched as a postpaid MVNO by Carphone Warehouse in October 2007, using the Vodafone network, Talkmobile was one of two run by Carphone Warehouse. The other was Fresh Mobile, a prepaid MVNO using the T-Mobile network. Fresh Mobile was discontinued on 19 March 2010 in favour of Talkmobile.

In November 2011, Carphone Warehouse sold Talkmobile to Vodafone in a deal worth £20 million.

In July 2017, Talkmobile began rolling out 4G to its customers.

The Talkmobile pay-as-you-go (PAYG) product was withdrawn on 31 August 2017.

Talkmobile sells 30-day and 12-month SIM-only plans, which all have unlimited UK calls and texts.
