= Olaf Swantee =

- Born: 31 January 1966 (age 60)
- Occupation: businessman
- Known for: Chief Executive of EE Limited
- Children: 3

Olaf Swantee (born 31 January 1966) is a Dutch businessman, and the former Chief Executive of EE Limited (formerly Everything Everywhere), a British telecommunications company.

== Early life ==
He is the second son of a legal professional.

He went to school in Hilversum in North Holland at the Nieuwe Lyceum Hilversum Gymnasium. He went to the University of Amsterdam to study Economics. Later he did an MBA at EAP (École des Affaires de Paris) in Paris, Berlin, and Oxford, which became ESCP Europe, in 1989. At Oxford he took up rowing.

== Career ==
He started with Compaq, then moved to the Digital Equipment Corporation, which was bought by Compaq in 1998. HP bought Compaq in 2002.

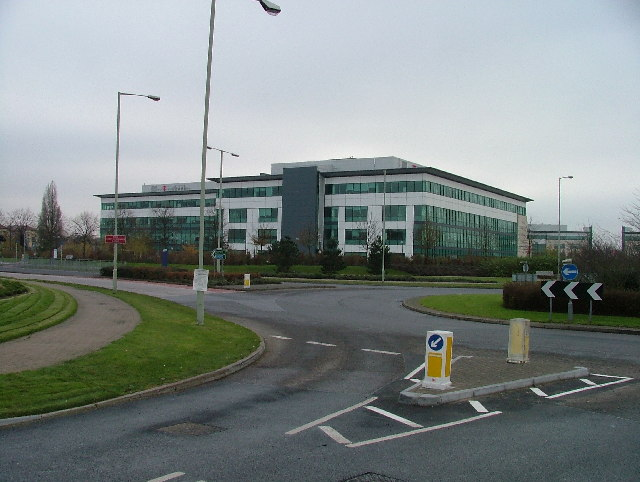
UK headquarters (former One2One, then T-Mobile UK) in Hertfordshire of EE)

=== Orange ===
He joined Orange in 2007. He served as Head of Mobile Operations of Europe & Middle East of France Telecom at Orange Home UK Limited since August 2007 and served as its Executive Vice President of Europe of France Telecom.

=== Everything Everywhere ===
He became Chief Executive of EE on 1 September 2011. EE has a main office in Paddington. EE has around 580 stores, and is known for its cinema adverts with Kevin Bacon. In January 2015 it was announced that BT would buy EE for £12.5bn. Everything Everywhere had been formed on 1 July 2010. On 4 January 2016 EE announced that Swantee would be standing down as CEO after the acquisition by BT was completed.

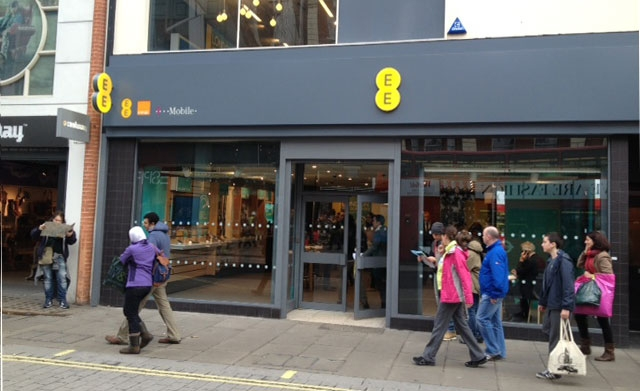
EE shop in Oxford in November 2012

=== Sunrise ===
From 9 May 2016 to 3 January 2020 Swantee was CEO of Swiss telecommunications company Sunrise.

== Personal life ==
He has a Swedish wife. His son Gustav, who is currently studying at university of St. Gallen in Switzerland, and two daughters were born in Switzerland (Zurich). He lives in the London Borough of Richmond upon Thames.

== See also ==
- Marc Bolland, Dutch chief executive of M&S since 2010
- Dame Patricia Hodgson, Chairman since 2014 of Ofcom

Business positions
Preceded by Tom Alexander	Chief Executive of Everything Everywhere; September 2011 – January 2016	Succeeded by Marc Allera
