= Reverse SMS billing =

Mobile phone message reverse-billing process

Reverse SMS billing or premium SMS service is a mechanism that allows the user of the recipient phone rather than the message sender to be charged for the cost of the SMS message received. It is also called MT (Mobile Terminated) Billing. Reverse-billed SMS messages are only sent if specifically requested by the phone user; however, many unscrupulous operators will send reverse-charged messages without prior consent of the recipient, which often go un-noticed by users on Pay As You Go plans without itemised billing. The consent may also be hidden in the fine print of an advertisement. A daily weather alert is an example of a service where regular reverse-billed messages are received.

In some countries, providers are required by law or regulation to provide a means of opting out of a service once it has been commenced. Most typically, this is achieved by sending a stop message (most typically, simply STOP) to the same number as the service itself.

== See also ==
- Collect call
- Premium-rated short messages
