= Vodafone UK =

British telecommunications company

Vodafone Limited
- Formerly: Racal-Vikonics Limited (1980–1983); Racal-Millicom (Operating) Limited (1983–1984); Racal-Vodafone Limited (1984–1991)
- Type: Subsidiary
- Industry: Telecommunications
- Founded: 7 January 1980; 46 years ago
- Founder: Ernest Harrison; Gerry Whent
- Headquarters: Newbury, Berkshire, England, UK
- Number of locations: 387 stores
- Area served: United Kingdom
- Key people: Max Taylor (CEO)
- Brands: VOXI; Talkmobile
- Services: Telecommunications; Internet service provider
- Parent: VodafoneThree
- Website: vodafone.co.uk

Vodafone Limited, trading as Vodafone UK, is a British telecommunications company, owned since May 2025 by VodafoneThree, a subsidiary of Vodafone Group. The country's first cellular phone call was made on the Vodafone network in 1985, and the world's first SMS text message in 1992.

Vodafone is the third-largest mobile network operator in the United Kingdom, with 18.3 million subscribers as of February 2025, after O2 and EE, and followed by sister company Three.

In June 2023, it was announced that subject to regulatory approval, Vodafone UK and Three UK would merge to create Britain's biggest mobile network. The merger was approved by the Competition and Markets Authority in December 2024, and completed in May 2025, with the company becoming part of VodafoneThree. Within six months of the merger, customers were expected to receive access to a shared Vodafone-Three network.

== History ==
=== Mobile network ===
In 1981, Racal Electronics Group won its bid for the private sector UK Cellular licence, and created Racal Telecomms Division. The same year, Racal formed a joint venture with Millicom named 'Racal Vodafone'. The Vodafone name was first unveiled on 22 March 1984. Vodafone made the first cellular telephone call in the United Kingdom on 1 January 1985, from St Katharine Docks to Newbury, and launched the UK's first cellular network later that year. 'Vodapage' was launched two years later, providing 80% of the United Kingdom's population with a paging service, and a service called 'Vodata' was also launched for voice and data.

Racal Telecom was demerged from Racal Electronics in 1991, becoming Vodafone Group, and introduced the country's first GSM mobile phone network the same year. The company launched digital data, fax and a text messaging service with Vodata in 1994. Vodafone also began working with Globalstar to develop and launch a satellite to provide a Satellite phone service.

On 5 January 1999, Vodafone UK connected its 5 millionth customer. By the end of 1999 it had 8 million customers, rising to 12 million in 2001.

The first 3G voice call in the UK was made in April 2001 on the Vodafone UK network, with an initial network of 30 base stations in the Thames Valley set for the commercial launch in 2002. That same month Vodafone launched GPRS services. Around the same time, Vodafone's analogue TACS network was closed after 16 years of service. In 2003, Vodafone introduced the 'Speaking Phone', a phone for blind and visually impaired users. Vodafone Mobile Connect 3G was launched in 2005, a data card that uses the network's 3G capabilities to connect laptop users to the internet.

Vodafone UK won Mobile Retailer's 'National Retailer of the Year' in 2005 and was awarded 'Best Network' in the 2010 Mobile News and Mobile Awards.

In May 2011, Vodafone and Justgiving launched 'JustTextGiving', which allows mobile phone user to donate between £1 and £10 to a registered charity using a SMS message, which is paid for by the donor through reverse SMS billing. Vodafone invested £5 million to ensure that charities do not incur any set-up costs, or commissions deducted from donations, ensuring that they receive 100% of donations and Gift Aid.

Vodafone and O2 signed a deal in June 2012 which will see the two companies 'pool' their network technology, creating a single national grid of 18,500 transmitter sites. Both networks will continue to carry their own independent mobile spectrum.

On 20 February 2013, Ofcom announced that Vodafone had been awarded spectrum in the 800 MHz and 2.6 GHz bands for 4G LTE coverage, bidding around £790 million for the spectrum. The service became available to customers in London on 29 August, and will expand to a further twelve cities by the end of 2013.

On 29 March 2018, following the release of iOS 11.3, Vodafone launched VoLTE (4G Calling) for iPhone users, with devices from the iPhone 6S to the iPhone X being compatible. The feature had been active on some Android phones from Huawei, Samsung Mobile and Sony Mobile prior to its launch on Apple Inc. devices.

On 3 July 2019, Vodafone launched their 5G network in Birmingham, Bristol, Cardiff, Glasgow, Manchester, Liverpool and London, with more towns and cities launching throughout 2019.

In February 2024, Vodafone shut down their 3G network.

=== Fixed network ===
On 1 April 2012, Vodafone agreed to a takeover of Cable & Wireless Worldwide at a cost of just over £1 billion. The acquisition gave Vodafone access to its own fixed line network, in addition to the already established mobile network, allowing the company to begin work on launching a variety of fixed line services to Enterprise customers in addition to the ex-CWW customers which it acquired during the initial takeover.

Using this network, they launched home broadband brand Vodafone Connect in June 2015, originally for existing Vodafone mobile customers in areas like Manchester, Berkshire, Hampshire, and Surrey. Speeds could reach 76 Mbit/s. The company then opened its broadband service (Vodafone Broadband) to the wider UK public on 12 October 2015. Plans to launch a UK television service were also developed, originally scheduled for spring 2015, but were subsequently put on hold.

Vodafone partnered with CityFibre to deliver FTTP (Fibre to the Premises), with a rollout planned for mid-2018. By 2020, Vodafone was rolling out ultra-fast full fibre broadband in several UK cities with Openreach and CityFibre. Speeds reached up to 900 Mbit/s in certain areas.

By June 2022, Vodafone had become the UK’s largest full fibre broadband provider (in terms of homes able to access its full fibre service), overtaking BT. Later changes would add full fibre speeds (up to 2.2 Gbit/s) under the “Vodafone Pro 2 Broadband” product name, which included new hardware like a WiFi 6E router. This has since been usurped by Vodafone’s Pro 3 (21), which utilises a WiFi 7 router.

In June 2025, Community Fibre announced a wholesale agreement with VodafoneThree that would allow VodafoneThree to offer full-fibre broadband to more than 1.3 million homes over Community Fibre's London network.

==== Business broadband ====
Vodafone first offered full fibre services for small office and home office (SoHo) businesses in early 2020, partnering with CityFibre and Openreach to deliver gigabit broadband connections to business premises.

== Radio frequency summary ==
Frequencies used on the Vodafone UK network
Frequency	Protocol	Band	Class
900 MHz	GSM/GPRS/EDGE		2G
1,800 MHz	GSM/GPRS/EDGE/LTE/LTE-Advanced	3	2G/4G/4G+
900 MHz	LTE/LTE Advanced	8	4G/4G+
2,100 MHz	LTE/LTE Advanced	1	4G/4G+
800 MHz	LTE/LTE Advanced	20	4G/4G+
900 MHz	LTE/LTE Advanced	8	4G/4G+
1,500 MHz (SDL)	LTE Advanced	32	4G+
2,600 MHz (FDD)	LTE/LTE Advanced	7	4G/4G+
2,600 MHz (TDD)	TD-LTE	38	4G/4G+
3,500 MHz (TDD)	5G NR	n78	5G
900 MHz (TDD)	5G NR	8	5G
2,100 MHz (TDD)	5G NR	1	5G

Vodafone LTE 1,800 MHz is only available in some areas, having been refarmed from 2G (1,800 MHz), whereas the LTE 2,100 MHz is available in a rapidly increasing number of areas and is very potent in areas such as Cardiff, London, Manchester and Birmingham.

== Network ==
Vodafone uses a mix of Openreach (BT) network and alternative network providers like CityFibre and Community Fibre to deliver services.

Technologies:

- FTTC (Fibre to the Cabinet) – up to ~~~~~76 Mbit/s.
- FTTP (Fibre to the Premises) – full fibre up to 2.2 Gbit/s (through Openreach and CityFibre).
- Scale: By 2022, Vodafone became the largest provider of full fibre access (in terms of premises able to order).
- Router technology: The latest Pro 3 Broadband product includes WiFi 7 routers, mesh WiFi boosters, automatic 4G backup SIMs.

=== Pro Broadband ===
Vodafone’s Pro Broadband is the network provider’s premium tier for home broadband customers, currently marketed as Vodafone Pro Broadband 3. It offers WiFi 7 compatibility and offers speeds of up to 2.2 Gbit/s, along with ancillary services like Vodafone’s Secure Net Home (online security and parental controls), and 4G Broadband Back-up.

== Marketing ==
=== Stores ===
Vodafone operates a retail estate consisting of both company-owned and franchised (known as Partner Agent) stores. As of 2025, there are over 400 stores in the UK.

A 'Tech Team' section (similar to Apple's Genius Bar) was rolled out in November 2011 to Vodafone 'Elite' status stores in cities and large towns, offering free advice to all customers of the mobile network. Vodafone also introduced the 'RED Box' to its stores at the same time, which allows phone users to transfer contents between handsets.

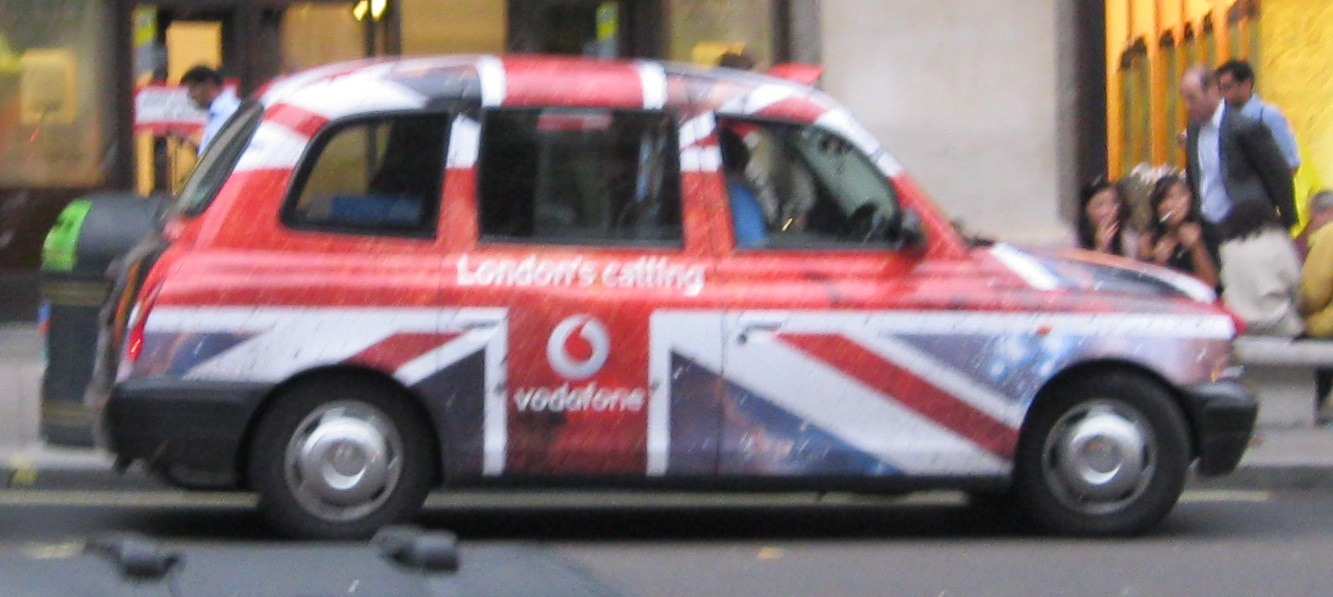
London Taxi with Vodafone livery

=== Vodafone VIP ===
Beginning in 2010, Vodafone UK operated a 'VIP' reward scheme as part of a partnership with Live Nation, in which customers could access tickets 48 hours before release for major UK events including T in the Park, Isle of Wight Festival, Reading & Leeds festival, London Fashion Week and the British Grand Prix. Some of the music festivals involved in the scheme had their own 'Vodafone VIP' areas, available to customers by winning certain competitions. In May 2013, the Vodafone VIP Mobile Application developed by Invitation Digital was launched on both iPhone and Android platforms. In January 2014, Vodafone announced the closure of Vodafone VIP with immediate effect.

=== Freebee Rewardz ===
Vodafone UK launched a loyalty scheme named 'Freebee Rewardz' in late 2011, accompanied by a £3million marketing campaign featuring two CGI bees named Jack and Mike voiced by Dan Antopolski and Karl Theobald. Each time a pay-as-you-go customer top-up £15 (such as a discount on a film from Blockbuster, or free credit toward their balance) to collect 'Pointz' that can be added to their bigger prize. In May 2015 Rewardz were renamed Rewards to reflect marketing changes.

=== 30-day service guarantee and Flexi-Upgrade ===
In 2017, Vodafone UK launched two new features. One was called 30-day network satisfaction. If new or upgrading customers were not happy with the Vodafone service and coverage within the first 30 days of having the contract, they can cancel and leave the network. The other new feature was Flexi-Upgrades, which allows Vodafone customers, after six months of a current contract, to upgrade to a new device and contract after paying a certain amount off of their contract/device plan.

In June 2018, the 30-day Network Satisfaction was renamed and readvertised as the 30-day Service Guarantee. However, in July 2019 the 30-day return period was removed by Vodafone and was subsequently reduced to 14 days.

=== Slogans ===
Vodafone used the slogan "How are you?" in the UK between 2003 and 2006, but briefly switched in 2007 to "Make the Most of Now".

In October 2017, Vodafone unveiled a new global brand campaign. This saw the logo return to its former 2D appearance and the introduction of a new slogan "The future is exciting... Ready?"

=== The Official Vodafone Big Top 40 ===
From November 2010, Vodafone used commercial radio's syndicated chart show to advertise its products and offers. The company sponsored Global Radio's Big Top 40 Show, with their advertisements running on 125 radio stations, including London's Capital FM.

For the first 12 months of their sponsorship, Vodafone pushed their 'Freebees' brand and the show was named The Vodafone Freebees Big Top 40 Show before being changed to simply The Vodafone Big Top 40 in 2011.

=== Be Unlimited ===
On 10 July 2019, Vodafone launched their new ad campaign "Be Unlimited" to accompany the launch of their new unlimited data plans which include 4G and 5G network coverage.

=== Sponsorships and connectivity partner ===
Vodafone has been the official connectivity partner and sponsor for Glastonbury festival since March 2023, signing a multi-year agreement with the festival to provide mobile coverage and free charging at the festival.

Vodafone has been the official connectivity partner of the British Summer Time festival since April 2022, signing a multi-year deal to provide mobile coverage for the festival.

Vodafone has been the official connectivity partner of the Boardmasters festival since November 2023, signing a multi-year deal to provide mobile coverage for the festival.

Vodafone has been the official connectivity partner of the Mighty Hoopla & Kendal Calling festivals since April 2022, signing a multi-year deal to provide mobile coverage for the festivals.

Vodafone has been the network partner and sponsor of Wimbledon Championships since January 2022, signing a five-year deal to provide mobile coverage across all tennis courts.

Vodafone has been the shirt sponsor of Wales women's team since September 2022. This was extended to the men's national team in June 2023 on a multi-year deal.

Vodafone was the shirt sponsor for the 2021 rugby tour of the British & Irish Lions in South Africa.

Vodafone was the shirt sponsor for English premiership mens and women's rugby & netball teams Wasps from 2019 until 2023, before the club went into administration.

Vodafone has been the back shirt sponsor of Scotland's mens and women's team since August 2024.

Vodafone became the official connectivity partner for six major festivals including Reading Festival, Leeds Festival, Latitude Festival, Download Festival, Wilderness Festival on 16th March 2026 signing a multi-year deal to provide mobile coverage for all the festivals.

== Controversies ==
=== Data charges ===
Vodafone UK came under criticism in June 2011 after they scrapped their fair-use policy on data charges, meaning those without monthly allowances would pay £0.50 for every 10 MB of data used.

=== Loss of network ===
A break-in at the Vodafone exchange centre in Basingstoke on 28 February 2011 left several hundreds of thousands of customers in the west of London without network access, after burglars stole computer equipment and damaged network hardware.

=== Subcontracting to third-parties ===
Vodafone was criticised after the Manchester Arena bombing in May 2017. The company outsourced the National Mutual Aid Telephony system to a third party, Content Guru. When the attack occurred, the system failed resulting in those affected by the attack not being able to contact police or emergency services.

=== Loyalty penalty claim ===
In November 2025, the Competition Appeal Tribunal (CAT) approved a class action claim in the UK from consumer rights expert Justin Gutmann against Vodafone and other UK mobile operators. The claim alleges that Vodafone charged long standing customers for their mobile phones beyond their contractual terms. Gutmann is representing 10.9 million contracts that were affected between 1 October 2015 and 31 March 2025. The claim could see Vodafone and other operators, paying over £1.1 billion in damages, (roughly £104 per contract). Gutmann said to the media that "for far too long the phone companies have been taking advantage of their loyal customers". Mobile networks, including Vodafone, deny any wrongdoing.

== VOXI by Vodafone ==
On 9 September 2017, Vodafone launched their VOXI SIM-only plans which offered users under 25 unlimited minutes, texts and endless data to social media websites and apps. In 2018 the upper age limit was raised to 30. In November 2018, Voxi started selling contracted and SIM-free phones. In April 2019 the upper age limit was removed by Vodafone, meaning that VOXI is available to all users regardless of their age.

VOXI users gained access to Vodafone's 5G services in October 2019, although access was limited to users on the unlimited plan only. Users of lower-priced plans gained access to the new technology in September 2020, along with unlimited video streaming.
