= List of telecommunications regulatory bodies =

Legal regulatory bodies that govern telecommunications systems in different countries are as follows.

This list contains bodies ensuring effective regulatory role in a territory which is not necessarily a state, but is listed as "territory" or "economy" in the statistics of international institutions, in particular the International Telecommunication Union (ITU).

== By country ==
Country	Telecommunications regulator
Afghanistan	Afghanistan Telecom Regulatory Authority (ATRA)
Albania	Electronic and Postal Communications Authority (AKEP)
Algeria	Autorité de Régulation de la Poste et des Communications Électroniques (ARPCE)
Angola	Ministério das Telecomunicações e Tecnologias (MTTI)
Angola	Instituto Angolano das Comunicações (INACOM)
Argentina	Ente Nacional de Comunicaciones (ENACOM)
Anguilla	Public Utilities Commission of Anguilla (PUC)
Antigua and Barbuda	Telecommunications Division of the Government of Antigua and Barbuda (TD)
Armenia	Public Services Regulatory Commission (PSRC)
Aruba	Netherlands Radiocommunications Agency (NRA)
Australia	Australian Communications and Media Authority (ACMA)
Austria	Austrian Regulatory Authority for Broadcasting and Telecommunications (RTR-GmbH)
Azerbaijan	Ministry of Transport, Communications and High Technologies (Azerbaijan) (MINCOM)
Bahamas	Utilities Regulation & Competition Authority (URCA)
Bahrain	Telecommunications Regulatory Authority (TRA)
Bahrain	Directorate of Wireless Licensing, Frequencies & Monitoring (iGA)
Bangladesh	Bangladesh Telecommunication Regulatory Commission (BTRC)
Barbados	Telecommunications Unit (Telecoms Unit)
Belarus	Ministry of Posts and Telecommunications (MPT)
Belgium	Belgian Institute for Postal services and Telecommunications (BIPT)
Belize	Belize Public Utilities Commission (PUC)
Benin	Autorité de Régulation des Communications Électroniques et de la Poste (ARCEP)
Bhutan	Bhutan InfoComm and Media Authority (BICMA)
Bolivia	Superintendencia de Telecomunicaciones (SITTEL)
Botswana	Botswana Communications Regulatory Authority (BOCRA)
Brazil	Agencia Nacional de Telecomunicacoes (ANATEL)
Brazil	Ministério da Ciência, Tecnologia, Inovações e Comunicações (MCTIC)
Brunei	Authority for Info-communications Technology Industry (AITI)
Bosnia and Herzegovina	Communications Regulatory Agency of Bosnia-Herzegovina (CRA)
Bulgaria	Communications Regulation Commission (CRC)
Burkina Faso	Autorité de Régulation des Communications Électroniques et des Postes (ARCEP)
Burundi	Agence de Régulation et de Contrôle des Télécommunications (ARCT)
Cambodia	Telecommunication Regulator of Cambodia (TRC)
Cameroon	Agence de Régulation des Télécommunications (ART)
Canada	Innovation, Science and Economic Development Canada (ISED)
Canada	Canadian Radio-television and Telecommunications Commission (CRTC)
Cape Verde	National Communications Agency (ANAC)
Cayman Islands	Information and Communications Technology Authority (ICTA)
Central African Republic	Autorité de Régulation des Communications Électroniques et de la Poste (ARCEP)
Chad	Autorité de Régulation des Communications Électroniques et de la Poste (ARCEP)
Chile	Subsecretaria de Telecommunicacaiones (SUBTEL)
China	Ministry of Information Industry (MII)
Colombia	Comisión de Regulación de Comunicaciones (CRC)
Colombia	Ministerio de Tecnologías de la Información y las Comunicaciones (MinTIC)
Colombia	Autoriad Nacional de Televisión (ANTV)
Colombia	Agencia Nacional del Espectro (ANE)
Comoros	Autorité Nationale de Régulation des Tics (ANRTIC)
Republic of Congo	Agence de Régulation des Postes et Communications Électroniques (ARPCE)
Costa Rica	Superintendencia de Telecomunicaciones (SUTEL)
Croatia	Croatian Regulatory Authority for Network Industries (HAKOM)
Cuba	Ministério de la Informática y las Comunicaciones de Cuba (MIC)
Curaçao (former Netherlands Antilles)	Bureau Telecommunicatie & Post (BT&P)
Cyprus	Office of Electronic Communications & Postal Regulation (OCECPR)
Czech Republic	The Czech Telecommunication Office (ČTÚ)
Democratic Republic of the Congo	Autorité de Régulation de la Poste et des Télécommunications du Congo (ARPTC)
Denmark	The Agency for Data Supply and Infrastructure (SDFI)
Djibouti	Ministère de la Communication et de la Culture, chargé des Postes et Télécommunications, Porte-Parole du Gouvernement (MCCPT)
Dominica	Eastern Caribbean Telecommunications Authority (ECTEL)
Dominican Republic	Instituto Dominicano de las Telecomunicaciones (Indotel)
Ecuador	Agencia de Control y Regulación de las Telecomunicaciones (ARCOTEL)
El Salvador	Superintendencia General de Electricidad y Telecommunicaciones (SIGET)
Egypt	National Telecommunications Regulatory Authority (NTRA)
Equatorial Guinea	Órgano Regulador de las Telecomunicaciones (ORTEL)
Estonia	Estonian Consumer Protection and Technical Regulatory Authority ()
Eswatini	Swaziland Posts & Telecommunications Corporation (SPTC)
Ethiopia	Ethiopian Telecommunication Agency (ETA)
Fiji	Telecommunications Authority of Fiji (TAF)
Finland	Finnish Transport and Communications Agency (Traficom)
France	Autorité de Régulation des Communications Électroniques, des Postes et de la Distribution de la Presse (ARCEP)
France	Agence Nationale des Fréquences (ANFR)
France	Regulatory Authority for Audiovisual and Digital Communication (ARCOM)
France	Autorité de la Concurrence (AC)
French Polynesia	Service des Postes et Télécommunications de Polynésie Française (SPT)
Gabon	Autorité de Régulation des Communications Électroniques et des Postes (ARCEP)
Gambia	Gambian Public Utilities Regulatory Authority (PURA)
Georgia	Georgian National Communications Commission (GNCC)
Germany	Bundesnetzagentur (BNA)
Ghana	National Communications Authority (NCA)
Greenland	Tele-Post (TELE-POST)
Greece	Hellenic Telecommunications and Post Commission (EETT)
Grenada	Eastern Caribbean Telecommunications Authority (ECTEL)
Guatemala	Superintendencia de Telecomunicaciones (SIT)
Guinea	Regulatory Authority for Posts and Telecommunications (ARPT)
Guinea-Bissau	Autoridade Reguladora Nacional das Tecnologias de Informação e Comunicação da Guiné-Bissau (ARN)
Guyana	Guyana Public Utilities Commission (PUC) (PUC)
Haiti	Conseil National des Telecommunications (CONATEL)
Honduras	Comisión Nacional de Telecomunicaciones (CONATEL)
Hong Kong	Office of Communications Authority (OFCA)
Hungary	National Media and Infocommunication Authority (NMHH)
Iceland	Electronic Communications Office of Iceland (ECOI)
India	Telecom Regulatory Authority of India (TRAI)
Indonesia	Ministry of Communication and Digital Affairs (KOMDIGI)
Iran	Communication Regulatory Authority (CRA)
Iran	Audiovisual Media Regulatory Authority (SATRA)
Iraq	Communications and Media Commission (CMC)
Ireland	Commission for Communications Regulation (ComReg)
Isle of Man	Communications Commission (CC)
Israel	Ministry of Communications (MOC)
Italy	Autorità per le Garanzie nelle Comunicazioni (AGCOM)
Ivory Coast	Agence des Telecommunications de Cote d'Ivoire (ATCI)
Jamaica	Spectrum Management Authority (SMA)
Japan	Ministry of Internal Affairs and Communications (MIC)
Jordan	Telecommunications Regulatory Commission (TRC)
Kazakhstan	Ministry of Information and Communications of the Republic of Kazakhstan (MIC)
Kenya	Communications Authority of Kenya (CA)
Kiribati	Communications Commission of Kiribati (CCK)
Kosovo	Regulatory Authority of Electronic and Postal Communications (RAEPC)
Kuwait	Ministry of Communications ()
Kyrgyzstan	Ministry of transport and Communication of the Kyrgyz Republic (MTC)
Latvia	Public Utilities Commission (PUC)
Lebanon	Telecommunications Regulatory Authority (TRA)
Lesotho	Lesotho Communications Authority (LCA)
Liberia	Liberia Telecommunications Authority (LTA)
Libya	General Telecommunications Authority (GTA)
Liechtenstein	Office for Communications (AK)
Lithuania	Communications Regulatory Authority (RRT)
Luxembourg	Institut luxembourgeois de régulation (ILR)
Macau	Office for the Development of Telecommunications and Information Technologies (GDTTI)
Madagascar	Autorité de Régulation des Technologies de Communication (ARTEC)
Malawi	Malawi Communications Regulatory Authority (MACRA)
Malaysia	Malaysian Communications and Multimedia Commission (MCMC)
Maldives	Communications Authority of Maldives (CAM)
Mali	Autorité malienne de Régulation des Télécommunications, des Technologies de l'Information et de la Communication et des Postes (AMRTP)
Malta	Malta Communications Authority (MCA)
Mauritania	Autorite de Regulation (ARE)
Mauritius	Information and Communication Technologies Authority (ICTA)
Mexico	Instituto Federal de Telecomunicaciones (IFT)
Moldova	National Regulatory Agency for Electronic Communications and Information Technology (ANRCETI)
Mongolia	Communications Regulatory Commission of Mongolia (CRC)
Montenegro	Agency for Electronic Communications and Postal Services (EKIP)
Montserrat	Montserrat Info-Communications Authority (MICA)
Morocco	National Telecommunications Regulatory Agency (ANRT)
Mozambique	Instituto Nacional das Communicacoes de Mozambique (INCM)
Namibia	Communications Regulatory Authority of Namibia (CRAN)
Nepal	Nepal Telecommunications Authority (NTA)
Netherlands	Autoriteit Consument & Markt (ACM) previously Onafhankelijke Post en Telecommunicatie Autoriteit
Netherlands	Agentschap Telecom (AT)
Netherlands Antilles	Netherlands Radiocommunications Agency () (NRA)
New Caledonia	Autorité de la Concurrence de la Nouvelle-Calédonie (ACNC)
New Zealand	Commerce Commission of New Zealand (ComCom)
Nicaragua	Instituto Nicaragüense de Telecomunicaciones y Correos (Telcor)
Niger	Autorité de Régulation des Communications Électroniques et de la Poste (ARCEP)
Nigeria	Nigerian Communications Commission (NCC)
North Macedonia	Electronic Communications Agency (AEK)
Norway	Norwegian Communications Authority (NKOM)
Oman	Oman Telecommunications Regulatory Authority (TRA)
Pakistan	Pakistan Telecommunication Authority (PTA)
Palestine	Telecommunications Regulatory Commission (TRC)
Panama	Autoridad Nacional de los Servicios Públicos (ASEP)
Papua New Guinea	National Information And Communication Technology Authority (NICTA)
Paraguay	Comision Nacional de Telecomunicaciones (CONATEL)
Peru	Organismo Supervisor de Inversión Privada en Telecomunicaciones (OSIPTEL)
Philippines	National Telecommunications Commission (NTC)
Poland	Urząd Komunikacji Elektronicznej (UKE)
Portugal	Autoridade Nacional de Comunicações (ANACOM)
Puerto Rico	Junta Reglamentadora de Telecomunicaciones de Puero Rico (JRTPR)
Qatar	Communications Regulatory Authority (CRA)
Romania	National Authority for Management and Regulation in Communications of Romania (ANCOM)
Russia	Ministry of Telecom and Mass Communications of the Russian Federation (Minsvyaz)
Rwanda	Regulatory Agency for Public Utility Services of Rwanda (RURA)
Saint Kitts and Nevis	National Telecommunications Regulatory Commission of Saint Kitts and Nevis (NTRC)
Saint Lucia	National Telecommunications Regulatory Commission of Saint Lucia (NTRC)
Saint Vincent and the Grenadines	National Telecommunications Regulatory Commission of Saint Vincent and the Grenadines (NTRC)
Samoa	Office of the Regulator of Samoa (Samoa)
Saudi Arabia	Communications, Space and Technology Commission (CITC)
Senegal	Autorité de Régulation des Télécommunications et des Postes (ARTP)
Serbia	Republic Agency for Electronic Communication and Postal Services (RATEL)
Seychelles	Ministry of Information Technology and Communication (MISD)
Sierra Leone	National Telecommunications Commission (NATCOM)
Singapore	Info-communications Media Development Authority of Singapore (IMDA)
Singapore	Government Technology Agency (GovTech)
Sint Maarten	Bureau Telecommunications and Post (BTP)
Slovakia	Telecommunications Regulatory Authority of the Slovak Republic (TR)
Slovenia	Agency for communication networks and services of the Republic of Slovenia (AKOS)
Somalia	National Communications Authority - NCA (NCA)
South Africa	Independent Communications Authority of South Africa (ICASA)
South Korea	Korea Communications Commission (KCC)
South Sudan	National Communication Authority (NCA)
Spain	Comisión Nacional de los Mercados y la Competencia (CNMC)
Sri Lanka	Telecommunications Regulatory Commission of Sri Lanka (TRCSL)
Sudan	Telecommunications and Post Regulatory Authority (TPRA)
Suriname	Telecommunications Authority Suriname (TAS)
Sweden	Swedish Post and Telecom Authority (Swedish: Post- och telestyrelsen) (PTS)
Switzerland	Federal Communications Commission (ComCom)
Switzerland	Office fédéral de la communication (OFCOM)
Syria	Ministry of Communications and Technology (MCT)
Taiwan (Republic of China) (Note: The political status of Taiwan is disputed. Due to the One-China policy, the Republic of China is formally recognised as the sole legitimate government of "China" by 13 UN member states, while The People's Republic of China continues to claim Taiwan and its associated islands as part of its own territory.)	National Communications Commission (NCC)
Tajikistan	Ministry of Transport and Communications · ()
Tanzania	Tanzania Communication Regulatory Authority (TCRA)
Thailand	National Broadcasting and Telecommunications Commission (NBTC)
Togo	Autorité de Régulation des Communications Électroniques et des Postes (ARCEP)
Tonga	Ministry for Information and Communications of Tonga (MIC)
Trinidad and Tobago	Telecommunications Authority of Trinidad and Tobago (TATT)
Turkmenistan	Turkmenistan Ministry of Communications (MC)
Turks and Caicos Islands	Telecommunications Commission (TCITC)
Tunisia	Instance Nationale des Télécommunications de Tunisie (INTT)
Turkey	Information And Communication Technologies Authority (ICTA)
Uganda	Uganda Communications Commission (UCC)
Ukraine	National Commission for the State Regulation of Communications and Informatization (NCCIR)
United Arab Emirates	Telecommunications Regulatory Authority (TRA)
United Kingdom	Ofcom (OFCOM)
United States	Federal Communications Commission (FCC)
Uruguay	Unidad Reguladora de Servicios de Telecomunicaciones (URSEC)
Uzbekistan	The State Inspection for control in the field of informatization and telecommunication of the Republic of Uzbekistan (ATKRV)
Vanuatu	Telecommunications Radiocommunications and Broadcasting Regulator (TRBR)
Venezuela	Comisión Nacional de Telecomunicaciones (CONATEL)
Vietnam	Vietnam Telecommunication Authority (VNTA)
Zambia	Zambia Information & Communications Technology Authority (ZICTA)
Zimbabwe	Postal & Telecommunications Regulatory Authority (POTRAZ)

== International ==
- African Telecommunications Union
- Caribbean Association of National Telecommunication Organisations (CANTO)
- Caribbean Telecommunications Union
- Cellular Telecommunications and Internet Association
- Eastern Caribbean Telecommunications Authority (ECTEL)
- European Conference of Postal and Telecommunications Administrations
- International Telecommunications Satellite Organization
