= Autorité de Régulation des Communications Électroniques et des Postes =

Autorité de Régulation des Communications Électroniques et des Postes, or ARCEP, may refer to several national agencies in charge of regulating telecommunications and postal services:

- Autorité de Régulation des Communications Électroniques et de la Poste (Benin)
- Autorité de Régulation des Communications Électroniques et des Postes (Burkina Faso)
- Autorité de Régulation des Communications Électroniques et de la Poste (Chad)
- Autorité de Régulation des Communications Électroniques, des Postes et de la Distribution de la Presse, France
- Autorité de Régulation des Communications Électroniques et des Postes (Gabon)
- Autorité de Régulation des Communications Électroniques et de la Poste (Niger)
- Autorité de Régulation des Communications Électroniques et des Postes (Togo)
