= Htay Saung =

Burmese dental professor

- ဌေးဆောင်

Rector of the University of Dental Medicine, Yangon
- In office 1993–1995
- Preceded by: Khin Mg Lay
- Succeeded by: Myint Naing

Personal details
- Born: 13 November 1944 (age 81) Rangoon, Burma
- Education: University of Medicine 1, Yangon (M.B., B.S., Ph.D., F.I.C.D.)
- Occupation: Professor, President of the MDA

Htay Saung (Burmese: ဌေးဆောင်; born 13 November 1944) is a Burmese dental professor who served as Rector of the University of Dental Medicine, Yangon from 1993 to 1995.

== Early life and education ==
Htay Saung was born in Rangoon, Myanmar on 13 November 1944. He graduated from University of Medicine 1, Yangon in July, 1970. He received Ph.D from Moscow in 1981.

== See also ==
- Myanmar Dental Association
- Myanmar Dental Council
- University of Dental Medicine, Mandalay
- University of Dental Medicine, Yangon
