= Mya Thaw =

Burmese dental professor

- မြသော်

Rector of the University of Dental Medicine, Mandalay
- In office 1998–2009
- Preceded by: Position established
- Succeeded by: Thein Kyu

Personal details
- Born: 13 November 1955 (age 70) Rangoon, Burma
- Spouse: Khin Win May
- Children: Phyo Zeya Thaw
- Education: Institute of Dental Medicine, Rangoon (B.D.S., M.Sc.)
- Occupation: Professor

Mya Thaw (Burmese: မြသော်; born 13 November 1955) is a Burmese dental professor who served as Rector of the University of Dental Medicine, Mandalay from 1998 to 2009.

== Biography ==
Mya Thaw was born in Rangoon, Myanmar on 13 November 1955. He graduated from University of Dental Medicine, Yangon in July, 1972.

He married Khin Win May, a dentist. They have one daughter and one son. His son Zayar Thaw was a House of Representatives MP.

== See also ==
- Myanmar Dental Association
- Myanmar Dental Council
- University of Dental Medicine, Mandalay
- University of Dental Medicine, Yangon
