= Pwint Hpoo =

Burmese dental professor

- ပွင့်ဖူး

President of the Myanmar Dental Association
- In office January 2012 – January 2016
- Preceded by: Thein Tut
- Succeeded by: Thein Kyu

Personal details
- Born: 13 November 1947 (age 78) Yangon
- Education: Institute of Dental Medicine, Rangoon (B.D.S., M.D.S.)
- Occupation: Professor, President

Pwint Hpoo (Burmese: ပွင့်ဖူး; born 13 November 1947) is a Burmese former dental professor at the University of Dental Medicine, Yangon. He was the president of the Myanmar Dental Association (MDA) from January, 2012 to January, 2016.

== Early life and education ==
Pwint Hpoo was born on 13 November 1947 in Yangon, Myanmar. He graduated from University of Dental Medicine, Yangon in July, 1971. He received M.Sc. from Manchester in 1981.

== See also ==
- Myanmar Dental Council
- University of Dental Medicine, Mandalay
