= Thein Tut =

- သိန်းထွတ်

President of the Myanmar Dental Association
- In office 2009–2011
- Preceded by: Ba Myint
- Succeeded by: Pwint Hpoo

Personal details
- Born: 13 November 1955 (age 70) Yangon
- Education: University of Calcutta
- Occupation: Professor, Dentist

Thein Tut (Burmese: သိန်းထွတ်; also spelt Thein Htut, born 13 November 1955) is a Burmese former dental professor at the University of Dental Medicine, Yangon. He was the president of the Myanmar Dental Association (MDA) from 2009 to 2011.

== Early life and education ==
Thein Tut was born in Yangon, Myanmar on 13 November 1955. He graduated from University of Dental Medicine, Yangon in July 1965. He received Ph.D from Japan in 1995.

== See also ==
- Myanmar Dental Association
- Myanmar Dental Council
- University of Dental Medicine, Mandalay
- University of Dental Medicine, Yangon
