= Myanmar Dental Association (Yangon Region) =

- မြန်မာနိုင်ငံ သွားနှင့်ခံတွင်း ဆရာဝန်အသင်း ရန်ကုန်တိုင်းဒေသကြီး
- Formation: 1994
- Type: Professional association
- Headquarters: Yangon, Myanmar
- Location: Myanmar
- Members: 500
- Official language: English and Burmese
- President: Naing Htun Thwin
- Staff: 15
- Website: yangon-mda.webs.com

The Myanmar Dental Association (Yangon Region) (Burmese: မြန်မာနိုင်ငံ သွားနှင့်ခံတွင်း ဆရာဝန်အသင်း ရန်ကုန်တိုင်းဒေသကြီး; MDA-Ygn) is a professional association established in 1994 which has more than 500 members. It arranges many continuing dental education programs for Myanmar dentists and community oral healthcare programs for Myanmar people. Myanmar Dental Association and Myanmar Dental Council are the only two professional organizations for Myanmar dentists.

== Leadership ==
Past presidents of the organisation include:

1. Dr Cho Khant (1998)
2. Dr Cho Sit (1998–2000)
3. Prof. Dr. Ba Myint (2004–2008)
4. Prof. Dr. Thein Htut (2008–2012)
5. Prof. Dr. Pwint Hpoo (2012–2016)
6. Prof. Dr. Thein Kyu (2016)
7. Dr Naing Htun Thwin (2016–present)

== Executive Committee members (2019-present) ==
1. Dr. Naing Tun Thwin (President)
2. Dr. Sein Lin (Vice-President)
3. Dr. Win Bo (Secretary)
4. Dr. Moe Tun (Secretary 1)
5. Dr. Hein Thu (Secretary 2)
6. Dr. Myo Min Zaw (Treasurer)
7. Dr. Nan Lei Yin Win (Audit)
8. Dr. Maung Toe
9. Dr. Aung Naing
10. Dr. Myint Htay
11. Dr. Nay Aung (Education committee)
12. Dr. Soe Lei Nwe
13. Dr. Ko Ko Aung
14. Dr. Yamin Cho
15. Dr. Phyo Zaw Hein
16. Dr. Hnin Yee Aye

== See also ==
- University of Dental Medicine, Mandalay
- University of Dental Medicine, Yangon
- Myanmar Dental Association
- Myanmar Dental Council
