= Ko Ko (academic) =

- ပါမောက္ခ ဒေါက်တာကိုကို

Rector of the University of Dental Medicine, Mandalay
- Incumbent
- Assumed office 2020
- Preceded by: Sun Sun Win

Personal details
- Born: 13 November 1960 (age 65) Rangoon, Burma
- Education: Institute of Dental Medicine, Rangoon

Ko Ko (Burmese: ပါမောက္ခ ဒေါက်တာကိုကို; born 13 November 1960) is a Burmese dental professor who currently serves as rector of the University of Dental Medicine, Mandalay.

== Early life and education ==
Ko was born in Yangon, Myanmar, on 13 November 1960. He graduated from University of Dental Medicine, Yangon, in July 1986. He received M.D.Sc in 1996 and Dr.D.Sc in 2014.
