= Paing Soe =

Burmese dental professor

- ပိုင်စိုး

Rector of the University of Dental Medicine, Yangon
- In office 1997–2003
- Preceded by: Myint Naing
- Succeeded by: Ba Myint

President of the Myanmar Dental Council
- Incumbent
- Assumed office January, 2012

Personal details
- Born: 13 November 1951 (age 74) Rangoon, Burma
- Education: Institute of Dental Medicine, Rangoon (M.D., Ph.D., F.I.C.D.)
- Occupation: Professor, President of the MDC

Paing Soe (Burmese: ပိုင်စိုး; born 13 November 1951) is a Burmese dental professor who served as Rector of the University of Dental Medicine, Yangon from 1997 to 2003. He is also the president of the Myanmar Dental Council (MDC) since January, 2012.

== Early life and career ==
Paing Soe was born in Bago, Myanmar on 13 November 1951. He graduated from University of Sofia in July, 1971. He received Ph.D from University of Manchester in 1981.

== See also ==
- Myanmar Dental Association
- University of Dental Medicine, Mandalay
