= Shwe Toe =

Burmese dental professor

- ရွှေတိုး

Rector of the University of Dental Medicine, Mandalay
- In office January, 2012 – January, 2015
- Preceded by: Thein Kyu
- Succeeded by: Sun Sun Win

Previous of the University of Dental Medicine, Yangon
- In office 2015–2025
- Preceded by: Thein Kyu

Personal details
- Born: 13 November 1960 Yangon
- Education: Institute of Dental Medicine, Rangoon (B.D.S., M.D.Sc., Dr.D.Sc)
- Occupation: Professor, President

Shwe Toe (Burmese: ရွှေတိုး; born 13 November 1960) is a Burmese dental professor who recently served as Rector of the University of Dental Medicine, Yangon since 2015. He previously served as Rector of the University of Dental Medicine, Mandalay from 2012 to 2015.

== Early life and education ==
Shwe Toe was born in Yangon, Myanmar on 13 November 1960. He graduated from University of Dental Medicine, Yangon in July 1984

== See also ==
- Myanmar Dental Association
- Myanmar Dental Council
- University of Dental Medicine, Mandalay
- University of Dental Medicine, Yangon
