= Khin Maung Lay =

Burmese dentist

- ခင်မောင်လေး

Rector of the University of Dental Medicine, Yangon
- In office 1983–1992
- Preceded by: Aung Than
- Succeeded by: Htay Saung

President of the Myanmar Dental Association
- In office 1985–1995
- Preceded by: Aung Than
- Succeeded by: Myint Naing

Personal details
- Born: 13 November 1941 (age 84) Rangoon, Myanmar
- Education: University of Medicine 1, Yangon (M.B., B.S., L.D.S., R.C.S., M.D.S., F.I.C.D., F.I.C.C.D.E.)
- Occupation: Professor, President of the MDA

Khin Maung Lay (Burmese: ခင်မောင်လေး; born 13 November 1941) is a Burmese dentist and a former Rector (1983–1992) of the University of Dental Medicine, Yangon. He was the second president (1985–1995) of the Myanmar Dental Association (MDA).

== Early life and education ==
Khin Maung Lay was born on 13 November 1941 in Rangoon, Myanmar. He graduated from the University of Medicine 1, Yangon in July 1961, and received an M.D.S. from England in 1963.

== See also ==
- Myanmar Dental Association
- Myanmar Dental Council
- University of Dental Medicine, Mandalay
- University of Dental Medicine, Yangon
