= Ba Myint =

Burmese dental professor

- ဘမြင့်

Rector of the University of Dental Medicine, Yangon
- In office 2004–2007
- Preceded by: Paing Soe
- Succeeded by: Myo Win

President of the Myanmar Dental Association
- In office 1997–2008
- Preceded by: Myint Naing
- Succeeded by: Thein Tut

Personal details
- Born: 13 November 1950 (age 75) Rangoon, Burma
- Education: University of Calcutta (B.D.S., D.Path., Ph.D., F.I.C.D.)
- Occupation: Professor, President of the MDA

Ba Myint (Burmese: ဘမြင့်; born 13 November 1950) is a Burmese dental professor who served as rector of the University of Dental Medicine, Yangon from 2004 to 2007. He was the fourth president of the Myanmar Dental Association (MDA), from 1998 to 2008.

== Early life and education ==
Ba Myint was born in Pathein, Myanmar on 25 May 1945. He graduated from university in July 1965. He received a Ph.D. from Japan in 1995.

== See also ==
- Myanmar Dental Council
- University of Dental Medicine, Mandalay
