= Sittwe (film) =

2017 Burmese short documentary film

- Burmese: စစ်တွေ
- Directed by: Jeanne Marie Hallacy
- Produced by: U Myo Win
- Cinematography: Sai Kyaw Khaing
- Edited by: Elizabeth Finlayson
- Production companies: Smile Education and Development Foundation
- Release dates: 5 July 2017 (FCCT); September 2017 (FreedomFilmFest)
- Running time: 19 minutes
- Countries: Myanmar; Thailand; United Kingdom
- Languages: Rakhine; Burmese; Bengali

Sittwe is a 2017 internationally co-produced short documentary film about two teenagers, a Muslim Rohingya girl and a Buddhist boy, in Rakhine State, Myanmar who were separated by conflict in the state. Directed by American filmmaker Jeanne Marie Hallacy, it was banned by Myanmar government censors from holding its premiere at the 5th Human Rights Human Dignity International Film Festival (HRHDIFF) in Yangon. Despite the ban, some short trailers of the film were screened in Myanmar. The directors of the film aimed to give a voice to the ordinary people involved in the Rakhine conflict and highlight the impact of a lack of education on racism and prejudiced attitudes.

Its first screening was instead held at the Foreign Correspondents' Club of Thailand (FCCT) in Bangkok on 5 July 2017. To give ordinary Americans a better understanding of the human situation in northern Rakhine, the film was screened and promoted amongst American universities, congressional organisations. The film was later screened at the Freedom Film Festival 2017 in Malaysia in early September, where it won the award for Best Southeast Asia Short Documentary. In late 2017 the Myanmar-based Smile Education and Development Foundation sponsored a screening tour of the film in more than twelve major U.S. cities, including New York, Baltimore, Berkeley, and Los Angeles. The tour featured director Hallacy and human rights activist and Smile Foundation founder Myo Win.

== Accolades ==
| Award | Ceremony date | Category | Recipient(s) | Result |
|---|---|---|---|---|
| Freedom Film Festival | September 2017 | Best Southeast Asia Short Documentary | Sittwe | Won |
