= Sun Sun Win =

Burmese dental professor

- ဆန်းဆန်းဝင်း

Rector of the University of Dental Medicine, Mandalay
- Incumbent
- Assumed office 2015
- Preceded by: Shwe Toe

Personal details
- Born: 13 November 1956 (age 69) Rangoon, Burma
- Education: Institute of Dental Medicine, Rangoon (B.D.S., M.D.Sc., Dr.D.Sc., Dip.Med.Ed.)
- Occupation: Professor, Rector

Sun Sun Win (Burmese: ဆန်းဆန်းဝင်း; born 13 November 1956) is a Burmese dental professor who currently serves as Rector of the University of Dental Medicine, Mandalay since 2015.

== Early life and education ==
Sun Sun Win was born in Yangon, Myanmar on 13 November 1956. She graduated from University of Dental Medicine, Yangon in July, 1983. She received M.D.Sc in 1993 and Dr.D.Sc in 2013.

== See also ==
- Myanmar Dental Association
- Myanmar Dental Council
