= Aung Than =

- အောင်သန်း

Rector of the Institute of Medicine, Yangon
- In office 1964–1982
- Preceded by: Position established
- Succeeded by: Khin Maung Lay

President of the Myanmar Dental Association
- In office 1979–1984
- Preceded by: Position established
- Succeeded by: Khin Maung Lay

Personal details
- Born: Rangoon, Myanmar
- Education: University of Pennsylvania School of Dental Medicine (DDS); Rangoon University Faculty of Medicine (MBBS) (LSMB)
- Occupation: Professor, President of the MDA

Aung Than (Burmese: အောင်သန်း) is a Burmese professor of dentistry, and the first rector of the Institute of Medicine, Yangon from 1964 to 1982. He later became Myanmar's ambassador to Australia.

== See also ==
- Myanmar Dental Association
- Myanmar Dental Council

== Bibliography ==
- Khin Thet-Hta; Khin Khin Win; Htay Htay Aye (2005), Who's who in Health and Medicine in Myanmar, Ministry of Health, Myanmar
- Taylor, Robert (2015), General Ne Win: A Political Biography, Singapore: Institute of Southeast Asian Studies, ISBN 978-981-4620-13-0
