= Ko Ko Maung =

Burmese dentist (born 1950)

- ကိုကိုမောင်

President/Director of the Cleft Lip and Palate Association
- In office 2013–present

Personal details
- Born: 13 November 1950 (age 75) Yangon
- Education: Institute of Dental Medicine, Rangoon (B.D.S., M.D.S.)
- Occupation: Professor, President

Ko Ko Maung (Burmese: ကိုကိုမောင်; born 13 November 1950) is a Myanmar Dental Professor. He served as the professor in University of Dental Medicine, Yangon from 1999 to 2012; he is the director of the Cleft Lip and Palate Association in Myanmar from 2012 to present. He is giving free of charge treatment to the hundreds of cleft lip and palate patients throughout Myanmar with volunteer Myanmar dental surgeons. Ko Ko Maung was born in Yangon, Myanmar on 13 November 1950. He graduated from University of Dental Medicine, Yangon in July, 1975.

== See also ==
- Cleft Lip and Palate Association
