= Telephone numbers in Somalia =

- Map of Somalia
- Country: Somalia
- Continent: Africa
- Regulator: National Communications Authority
- Numbering plan: National Numbering Plan
- Country code: +252
- International access: 00
- Long-distance: 0

Before the civil war in 1991, very few people had access to the government-controlled fixed-line telephony that only operated in a few areas. Following the fall of the central government, the telecommunication industry fell into the hands of private investors and telephone numbering remained unregulated. Following its re-establishment in 2012, the Federal Government the government recognized the need to establish regulatory frameworks to ensure effective oversight and development of the telecommunication sector, and in 2017, the government enacted the National Communications Authority which is tasked to regulate and oversee the telecommunications industry.

== Calling formats ==
To call Somalia, the following format is used:

- yxx xxx xxx, yyx xxx xxx or yyy xxx xxx - calls within Somalia.
- +252 yxx xxx xxx, +252 yyx xxx xxx or +252 yyy xxx xxx - calls from outside Somalia.

== List of area codes in Somalia ==
The telecommunication industry in Somalia has been managed by private businesses since the collapse of the Siad Barre government in 1991. However, following the establishment of the National Communications Authority] in 2017, the regulation of the country's telecom industry is now overseen by this authority, who has developed a number of regulations since its establishment.

In 2021, the National Communications Authority standardized the numbering of the fixed telephone services and has allocated codes to the Federal Member States in the following format:

List of Fixed Line Area Codes as of 2021
| National Destination Code (NDC) for fixed telephony | Area Code | Area/State | Example |
|---|---|---|---|
| 02 | 1 | Mogadishu | 021X XXX XXX |
| 02 | 2 | Somaliland | 022X XXX XXX |
| 02 | 3 | Jubaland | 023X XXX XXX |
| 02 | 4 | South West State of Somalia | 024X XXX XXX |
| 02 | 5 | Puntland | 025X XXX XXX |
| 02 | 6 | Hirshabelle | 026X XXX XXX |
| 02 | 7 | Galmudug | 027X XXX XXX |

== Mobile operators ==
According to the National Communications Authority, there are 13 registered mobile network operators in the country, 12 of which are licensed by the authority. A number of these operators have assigned numbering ranges.

| Prefix | International Format | Local Format | Operator |
|---|---|---|---|
| 61, 77 | +252 61X XXX XXX | 061X XXX XXX | Hormuud |
| 61, 77 | +252 77X XXX XXX | 077X XXX XXX | Hormuud |
| 62, 65, 66 | +252 62X XXX XXX | 062X XXX XXX | Somtel |
| 62, 65, 66 | +252 65X XXX XXX | 065X XXX XXX | Somtel |
| 62, 65, 66 | +252 66X XXX XXX | 066X XXX XXX | Somtel |
| 63 | +252 63X XXX XXX | 063X XXX XXX | Telesom |
| 64 | +252 64X XXX XXX | 064X XXX XXX | SomLink |
| 68 | +252 68X XXX XXX | 068X XXX XXX | SomNet |
| 69 | +252 69X XXX XXX | 069X XXX XXX | NationLink |
| 71 | +252 71X XXX XXX | 071X XXX XXX | Amtel |
| 90 | +252 90X XXX XXX | 090X XXX XXX | Golis |
