= To Singapore, With Love =

- Directed by: Tan Pin Pin
- Written by: Tan Pin Pin
- Release date: 2013
- Running time: 70 minutes
- Country: Singapore
- Language: English

To Singapore, With Love is a 2013 Singaporean documentary film written and directed by Tan Pin Pin. It features interviews with nine Singaporean political dissidents, former activists, and student leaders who fled Singapore from the 1960s to 1980s, living in exile in London and Malaysia. It was denied rating by the Media Development Authority of Singapore (MDA), effectually banning the film Singapore despite public disagreement with the decision.

To Singapore, With Love won Tan the best director award in the Muhr AsiaAfrica Documentary section at 10th Dubai International Film Festival and the Best Asian Documentary at the Salaya International Documentary Festival. It was shown at various film festivals at Malaysia, South Korea, Britain, Germany, Brazil, and the United States.

== Production ==
The film was made with the support of the Busan International Film Festival's Asian Cinema Fund.

== Summary ==
To Singapore, with Love follows director Tan Pin Pin's interviews with Singaporeans now living London, Malaysia, and Thailand having fled Singapore for their political views. Several of the interviewees were imprisoned without trial through Operation Coldstore and Operation Spectrum and fled Singapore upon release. Most prominently featured are Dr. Ang Swee Chai, Tan Wah Piow, and Ho Juan Thai. They tell their stories about their political activism and the subsequent retaliatory action by the Singaporean government. Tan Wah Piow shares his perspective on the accusation levied on him through Operation Spectrum. Chan Sun Wing reads his bittersweet poem about his gaining Thai citizenship. The documentary culminates in the funeral of Dr. Lim Hock Siew as numerous refugees attend.

To Singapore, with Love is a one-sided documentary, concerning itself solely with the experiences and emotions of the refugees. Uniquely, the documentary depicts an exile-like perspective like that of the interviewees, never depicting Singapore from within. It does not provide the political context of the time, and the depiction of the political environment is only as it pertains to the person interviewed. The documentary an emotional documentation of the lives of the refugees. It depicts the hardships brought upon them, portraying strained family connections, desire to return to Singapore, and disappointment of the actions of the Singaporean government, both at the time of leaving Singapore and at the time of the interview. It also depicts the successes the interviewees found post exile, including Tan Hee Kim's noodle shop, Tan Wiah Piow's book release, and Dr. Ang Swee Chai's foundation of Medical Aid for Palestinians.

== Release ==
=== Film festivals ===
The film made its world premiere at the Busan International Film Festival. It also screened at Malaysia's FreedomFilmFest, the Berlin International Film Festival's Forum programme, Film Society of Lincoln Center, Seoul International Documentary Festival, Brazil's It's All True, Jogja-Netpac Film Festival, International Film Festival of Kerala, Diaspora Film Festival, Incheon, and London's SEA ArtsFest, where it enjoyed four sold-out screenings over two days.

The film ran into controversy in Kuantan, Malaysia, where its October screening by human rights non-governmental organisation Pusat Komas under its annual FreedomFilmFest was cancelled after Putrajaya was alleged to have pressured the owner of the Kuantan venue that would have hosted the viewing. However, deputy home minister Datuk Dr Wan Junaidi Tuanku Jaafar denied the allegations, claiming that To Singapore, With Love was not banned and is still under scrutiny.

At the FreedomFilmFest screening in George Town, Penang, 15 officers from Malaysia's Ministry of Home Affairs turned up to stop the show, claiming that the film had not been vetted and approved by the film censor board. However, after half an hour of discussions with the organisers, the officers allowed the screening to proceed.

=== The Ban in Singapore ===
On 10 September 2014, it was effectively banned in Singapore. The Media Development Authority (MDA), in their film classification guidelines, outline that films "deemed to undermine public order" and national interest will be refused classification. To Singapore, With Love was refused classification and is low listed as "Not for all Ratings", making it illegal to view in Singapore. In the organization's statement regarding Tan's film, the MDA argues the film presents a biased account of true events, portraying the interviewees as victims and the actions of Singapore's national security organizations as harmful and illegitimate. The MDA argues the criminal actions of many of those featured in the film were understated or completely omitted, citing specifically people's involvement with the Communist Party of Malaysia, the Barisan Sosialis, and the Malayan National Liberation League.

==== Tan Pin Pin's response ====
Upon the MDA's decision to ban the documentary, also on 10 September 2014, Tan Pin Pin wrote in a statement, "I am very disappointed by the MDA decision to ban it—for myself, and also what it means for Singapore...Like my other films mentioned above, this film is a portrait of Singapore; unlike the others, this film is shot entirely outside the country, in the belief that we can learn something about ourselves by adopting, both literally and figuratively, an external view." She rebuts claims of one-sidedness by arguing that the documentary focuses not on politics as much as the daily lives of the interviewees, successes and hardships. She goes on to say,

Those feelings [of Singapore] (more than the circumstances of their exile, or even the historical “truth” that led to such exile) are what my film predominantly focuses on, because I feel that many viewers might relate to those feelings...I am therefore very disappointed that my film is banned. By doing this, MDA is taking away an opportunity for us Singaporeans to see it and to have a conversation about it and our past that this film could have started or contributed to. It is vital for us to have that conversation on our own terms, especially on the eve of our 50th birthday. We need to be trusted to be able to find the answers to questions about ourselves, for ourselves.

Tan Pin Pin concludes by stating the possibility of resubmitting To Singapore, With Love to the FAC in the future.

==== Resubmission ====
On 2 October, Tan resubmitted To Singapore, With Love, unchanged, to the Media Development Authority's Film Appeals Committee to review the ban. In a statement, Tan wrote, "As we approach our 50th birthday, I feel that we as a people should be able to view and weigh for ourselves, through legitimate public screenings in Singapore, differing views about our past, even views that the government disagrees with. I hope that Film Appeals Committee will see the film and review the classification in this light." On 12 November, Tan's review was denied. In a statement, the chairman of the Film Appeals Committee (FAC) said, "While of commendable artistic standard, the FAC found the film to be a one-sided account with minimal attempts to provide a balanced mix of views beyond those provided by the interviewees featured in the film". Of the 12 FAC members present, nine voted to uphold the classification while the other three voted that a Restricted 21 (R21) rating be given instead.

==== Public Response ====
After the film was initially banned in September 2014, a group of 39 artists, including filmmakers Anthony Chen, Royston Tan, and Kelvin Tong, released a joint statement expressing "deep disappointment" and urged the Media Development Authority to reverse the ban. In addition, academic Cherian George commented on the ban, writing that it is "not just disproportionate. It is also an insult to Singaporeans, who are in effect being told that they are not smart enough to engage critically with Tan's film, no matter how biased it may be, and to weigh what her interviewees claim against what the official history states." Chua Mui Hoong, the opinion editor of the conservative The Straits Times, did not support the ban, writing, "When there are diverging interpretations of events, like the arrests of leftist activists in the 1960s to 1980s, the best antidote is not a ban on some points of view, but more openness and access to information...Singapore and its history do not belong to the ruling party." Chua had joined a group of about 350 Singaporeans who had travelled to Johor Bahru, Malaysia, to watch To Singapore, With Love after the ban.

Response was not wholly in support of Tan Pin Pin and the documentary, however. Some supported the MDA's decision to uphold the ban. Then Prime Minister Lee Hsien Loong himself commented in support of the ruling. He expressed that emotional, inflammatory media, especially those that mislead or obscure truth, is dangerous and harmful.

== Awards ==
- Best Director award in the Muhr AsiaAfrica Documentary section at 10th Dubai International Film Festival
- Best Asean Documentary, Special Mention at the Salaya International Documentary Festival in Thailand
