= Myint Naing (professor) =

Burmese dental professor

Myint Naing, Dental
- မြင့်နိုင်

Rector of the University of Dental Medicine, Yangon
- In office 1995–1997
- Preceded by: Khin Mg Lay
- Succeeded by: Paing Soe

President of the Myanmar Dental Association
- In office 1996–1998
- Preceded by: Khin Mg Lay
- Succeeded by: Ba Myint

Personal details
- Born: 13 November 1942 (age 83) Rangoon, Myanmar
- Education: University of Calcutta (B.D.S., M.D.S., F.I.C.D.)
- Occupation: Professor, President

Myint Naing (Burmese: မြင့်နိုင်; born 13 November 1942) is a Burmese dental professor who was the rector of the University of Dental Medicine, Yangon from 1995 to 1997. He was the third president of the Myanmar Dental Association (MDA) from 1996 to 1998.

== Early life and education ==
Myint Naing was born in Rangoon, Myanmar on 13 November 1942. He graduated from University of Calcutta, Calcutta Medical College, India in July 1962. He received M.D.S. from Bombay in 1990.

== See also ==
- Myanmar Dental Association
- Myanmar Dental Council
- University of Dental Medicine, Mandalay
- University of Dental Medicine, Yangon
