= Free (ISP) =

French Internet service provider

Free SAS
- Type: Subsidiary (Société par actions simplifiée)
- Industry: Telecommunications
- Founded: 1999; 27 years ago
- Founder: Xavier Niel
- Headquarters: Paris, France
- Area served: France
- Key people: Nicolas Thomas (CEO)
- Products: Freebox, fixed broadband (DSL, FTTH), IPTV, Voice over IP
- Services: Internet access, fixed-line telephony, television
- Revenue: €6.63 billion (2025, France segment of Iliad, including Free Mobile)
- Parent: Iliad
- Website: www.free.fr

Free SAS, trading as Free (stylised as free), is a French Internet service provider and a subsidiary of the telecommunications group Iliad. Founded by Xavier Niel in 1999 as a provider of free dial-up Internet access, it became known in 2002 for the Freebox, a set-top box designed in-house that combined broadband Internet, telephony and television in a single device and was one of the first triple-play offers in the world. Its flat monthly price of €29.99, maintained for several years, played a significant part in the growth of ADSL in France and led its competitors to market their own "boxes".

Free is one of the four main telecommunications operators in France, alongside Orange, SFR and Bouygues Telecom. The Free brand also covers the mobile services of its sister company Free Mobile, launched in 2012. At the end of 2025, Iliad's French business had 23.3 million subscribers, comprising 7.6 million fixed broadband subscribers, 6.7 million of whom were connected to fibre, and 15.7 million mobile subscribers; it generated revenue of €6.63 billion that year. Free's head office is in the 8th arrondissement of Paris.

== History ==
=== Origins and free dial-up access (1999–2001) ===
Free grew out of Iliad, the holding company through which Xavier Niel ran Minitel information services in the 1990s. In February 1999, Iliad created a subsidiary, Proxad, to run its network and its Internet access software; its technical team, which included Antoine Levavasseur, Rani Assaf and Pierre Gohon, came largely from the small access provider Easynet.

On 26 April 1999, Free began offering Internet access in France without a subscription fee or a premium-rate telephone number. It was the third provider to enter this niche, after World Online on 1 April and Freesurf on 19 April 1999, but unlike them it limited neither connection time nor the number of subscribers. Users paid only for the cost of the local telephone call. The name of the service played on the double meaning of the English word "free", both "free of charge" and "free as in freedom".

The model relied on the interconnection payments that the incumbent France Télécom made to operators that brought traffic onto its network, an approach similar to the revenue-sharing system of the Minitel: the more subscribers Free attracted, the more it was paid. Rather than laying its own cables, the company leased optical fibre links from the operator LDCom for around twenty years, which allowed it to carry a growing share of its traffic on its own network and to reduce the fees it paid to the incumbent. At the same time, Niel began to build a management team. In December 1999, Michaël Boukobza, a 21-year-old business school graduate then on an internship at Morgan Stanley in London, approached him and offered his help with the negotiations then under way with Goldman Sachs. Niel entrusted him with renegotiating the terms of the deal, and Boukobza, later known as Michael Golan, soon became Iliad's managing director. The agreement was completed in May 2000: Goldman Sachs acquired 4.79% of Iliad for €15 million, which gave the young company credibility with investors and business partners. In August 2000, at a wedding, Boukobza met Olivier Rosenfeld, a Belgian banker working for Goldman Sachs in New York, and persuaded him to join the company; after meeting Niel, Rosenfeld became chief financial officer in 2001.

With the bursting of the dot-com bubble, the planned stock market listing was postponed, and Boukobza and Rosenfeld were tasked with restructuring a loss-making company. Several of Iliad's websites were sold or closed, payments to suppliers were renegotiated, and the main French banks refused to open an account for the company. Goldman Sachs increased its stake in 2002, and Axa Private Equity became a shareholder in 2003, but cash remained tight until the stock market listing.

In February 2002, Free became the first Internet service provider in France to offer connections using the V.92 standard. Dial-up access, however, soon became marginal: by 2006, 98% of French households were eligible for ADSL.

=== ADSL and the Freebox (2002–2007) ===
The launch of Free's broadband offer was made possible by changes in the French wholesale market. In July 2003, the European Commission fined Wanadoo Interactive, a subsidiary of France Télécom, for predatory pricing on ADSL, and the incumbent was required to apply fairer wholesale prices to alternative operators.

On 19 September 2002, Free launched an ADSL offer at €29.99 a month, supplied with the first version of the Freebox. The idea of designing the device in-house dated back to a study trip to Silicon Valley in late 2000, during which Niel and his engineers failed to find any American manufacturer able to supply the "three-in-one" equipment they were looking for. Rani Assaf took charge of the software and brought in Sébastien Boutruche, recruited from Sagem, to design the motherboard; the subsidiary Freebox SAS was created on 18 December 2000. The first model suffered from numerous malfunctions, and a corrected version followed in 2003.

Over the following months, Free added services to the box at no extra cost. Unlimited voice-over-IP calls to French landlines were introduced in July 2003, and television over ADSL in late November 2003, making Free the first operator in the world to offer IPTV on a large scale as part of a triple-play bundle, several months before Orange launched its own Livebox in 2004. Free won more than 400,000 ADSL subscribers in 2003. The brand had become so well known that Proxad itself took the name Free that year. Most other French providers subsequently named their own modems with the suffix "box", in imitation of the Freebox.

The growth of Free was closely linked to local-loop unbundling, which obliged France Télécom to lease the copper line between its exchanges and subscribers' homes to other operators. Although unbundling was meant to begin in 2000, it only started in practice at the end of 2002, after a long dispute between the regulator Arcep and the incumbent. By installing its own DSLAMs in the exchanges, Free could control the quality of service on its lines, offer television and stop paying bandwidth fees to France Télécom. In return it paid a monthly rental of about €9 per line, more than the €7.63 the regulator estimated to be the real cost, but still far more profitable than reselling the incumbent's wholesale product. In 2004, Free became the second operator in France, after Alice, to offer full unbundling, which allowed subscribers to give up their France Télécom line rental altogether. Its unbundling ratio rose from 3% of its subscribers in 2002 to more than 85% in 2009.

As banks remained reluctant to lend to the company, Rosenfeld argued in spring 2003, after the success of the first Freebox, that the money should be raised from shareholders. He prepared the listing over eight months and, with Boukobza, led most of the meetings with investors. Iliad, Free's parent company, was floated on the Paris stock exchange on 30 January 2004. The capital increase raised €95 million, and about 80% of the shares were placed with British and American investors. The shares rose 35% on their first day of trading, in what was the first Internet initial public offering in France since 2000.

Free continued to raise the speeds offered to its subscribers throughout the period, moving to ADSL2+ in October 2004 and reaching 28 Mbit/s in unbundled areas in 2006. In 2006 it also became involved in a dispute over call termination charges, after Neuf Cegetel sharply raised the rates it charged other operators for calls to its own numbers, a move that threatened unlimited calling plans. Free and France Télécom challenged the increase, and Arcep capped termination rates; unlimited calls to landlines have since become standard in France.

In 2007, a year of consolidation in the French broadband market, Free was the only Internet service provider brand to gain market share. It nonetheless lost its position as the country's second-largest provider in mid-2007, when Neuf Cegetel acquired Club Internet, the French subsidiary of T-Online. Until 2009, Free's growth was essentially organic, whereas Neuf Cegetel grew mainly by buying its competitors before being absorbed by SFR.

=== Fibre and the acquisition of Alice (2006–2011) ===
In September 2006, Free announced plans to build its own fiber to the home (FTTH) network, offering very high-speed access at the same price as its ADSL service. It was the first French operator to announce a large-scale fibre plan, and chose a "point-to-point" architecture, with a dedicated fibre for each home, which no other operator had then adopted. In August 2007 it specified an offer of 100 Mbit/s downstream with television on two sets, still at €29.99 a month. In Paris, the operator ran its cables through the city's sewers, and by December 2007 about 30% of the planned work in the capital had been completed. The plan, budgeted at €1 billion over six years, was poorly received by investors.

In March 2008, Iliad committed to covering 75% of Paris by the second half of 2009 and reiterated its target of connecting four million homes to its own network by 2012, a deployment it said would be financed entirely from existing activities. The first FTTH networks outside Paris were inaugurated in Montpellier in June 2008, in the presence of Iliad's chief executive Maxime Lombardini, and in Valenciennes in December 2009. Large-scale connections, however, depended on rules governing the sharing of fibre inside buildings, which Arcep only set out in 2009. The initial plan was only a little more than half completed by 2012, and at the end of 2015 Free had just over 200,000 fibre subscribers, compared with more than a million for Orange.

Free's subscriber growth had been almost entirely organic, apart from the purchase in 2006 of CitéFibre, a small FTTH provider with about 500 subscribers. In August 2008, Iliad completed its first large acquisition, buying Alice, the French broadband business of Telecom Italia, for €775 million. The deal made the group France's second-largest broadband provider again, behind Orange. It was followed by a redundancy plan affecting 320 to 340 people, about a quarter of Alice's workforce. Alice was later repositioned as a low-cost brand and then phased out, its customers being transferred to Free.

In December 2010, Free launched the Freebox Revolution, which had been in development since 2006. Designed by Philippe Starck, it consisted of a modem with a 250 GB hard disk acting as a home media server and a television box with a built-in Blu-ray player, an Internet browser and a games controller. The new package added unlimited calls to French mobile phones, and subscribers who gave up their France Télécom line paid €6 more per month than under the previous offer.

=== Free Mobile and convergent offers (2012–2019) ===
In December 2009, Arcep awarded Free Mobile, Iliad's mobile subsidiary, France's fourth 3G licence. Free Mobile launched its services in January 2012 with plans well below those of the three incumbents, relying initially on Orange's network for much of its coverage, and its arrival triggered a price war in the French mobile market. From then on, Free marketed fixed and mobile services together, with discounts on mobile plans for Freebox subscribers.

In early 2013, Free became involved in a dispute with Google over the cost of carrying the growing volume of video traffic, particularly from YouTube. On 3 January 2013, a software update to the Freebox Revolution activated an advertising blocker by default, which hid advertisements on many websites. After protests from website publishers, the minister for the digital economy, Fleur Pellerin, asked Free to restore full access to advertising, arguing that an Internet provider had no right to edit the content seen by its subscribers; the blocker was disabled on 7 January. Following a complaint from the consumer association UFC-Que Choisir, which accused Free of slowing down YouTube at peak times, Arcep opened an investigation; in July 2013 it concluded that it had found no practice contrary to net neutrality and attributed the slowdowns to congestion of the interconnection links between Free and Google.

In March 2015, Free introduced the Freebox Mini 4K, a small box running Android TV and presented as the first triple-play offer in the world compatible with Ultra HD, available at the standard price of €29.99 a month. In December 2018, after a period in which Free had been losing subscribers, it unveiled two new models, the Freebox One and the high-end Freebox Delta. The Delta supported fibre speeds of up to 10 Gbit/s, combined DSL with 4G in rural areas, and included speakers developed by Devialet, the Amazon Alexa voice assistant, home-automation features and a subscription to Netflix, for €50 a month.

=== Since 2020 ===
In July 2020, Free launched the Freebox Pop, a mid-range offer with a 4K Android TV box, a new television interface called OQee and fibre speeds of up to 5 Gbit/s, priced at €29.99 a month for the first year and €39.99 thereafter. In December 2020, Free Mobile opened its 5G network with 5,255 active sites covering almost 40% of the population. Unlike its competitors, it relied heavily on the 700 MHz band, which offers wider coverage and better indoor reception but lower speeds than the 3.5 GHz band.

On 30 January 2024, Free presented the Freebox Ultra, which offered symmetric fibre speeds of up to 8 Gbit/s and was the first box on the French market to support Wi-Fi 7. Priced at €49.99 a month for the first year, it included several streaming services, among them Netflix, Prime Video and Disney+. In September 2024, Free Mobile became the first operator in France to launch standalone 5G. In 2025, Free included in its mobile plans the paid version of Le Chat, the assistant developed by the French start-up Mistral AI, extended Wi-Fi 7 to its Freebox Pop range, added a consumer VPN service to its mobile plans at no extra cost and launched Free TV, a free television service open to all French households.

In October 2024, Free disclosed a cyberattack on one of its internal management tools. The stolen databases contained information on more than 19 million customer accounts and over five million bank account details; according to the company, passwords, card details and the content of communications were not affected. A suspect was arrested and charged in January 2025. In January 2026, the French data protection authority, the CNIL, fined Free Mobile €27 million and Free €15 million for breaches of the General Data Protection Regulation related to the incident (see below).

In October 2025, Iliad, Bouygues Telecom and Orange made a joint offer for most of SFR's activities. In June 2026, the three operators signed a memorandum of understanding with Altice France to acquire SFR for €20.35 billion. Under the agreement, Iliad would pay €6.2 billion and take over about eight million customers, including the roughly six million customers of the low-cost brand RED by SFR, about 1.6 million SFR consumer customers and 400,000 small business customers, representing about 27% of SFR's revenue. The deal, which would reduce the number of mobile network operators in France from four to three, is subject to approval by French and European competition authorities.

== Freebox ==
The Freebox is central to Free's offer. Initially the name of the device alone, it gradually became the name of the subscription itself. Since the first model in 2002, the box has been designed by the group's subsidiary Freebox SAS rather than bought from an equipment manufacturer, which allows Free to add services through software updates and to control its costs. Subscribers can generally upgrade to a newer model, and successive generations have been marketed in parallel at different price points.

Main generations of the Freebox
| Model | Launch | Main features |
|---|---|---|
| Freebox (V1) | September 2002 | ADSL access at €29.99 a month |
| Freebox V2–V4 | 2003–2004 | Voice over IP (2003), television over ADSL (2003), later ADSL2+ |
| Freebox HD (V5) | 2006 | High-definition television, used for the first fibre offers |
| Freebox Revolution (V6) | December 2010 | Design by Philippe Starck, Blu-ray player, network storage, unlimited calls to mobiles |
| Freebox Mini 4K | March 2015 | Android TV, Ultra HD |
| Freebox Delta and Freebox One (V7) | December 2018 | 10 Gbit/s fibre, Devialet speakers, home automation, Netflix included |
| Freebox Pop (V8) | July 2020 | Android TV, OQee interface, up to 5 Gbit/s |
| Freebox Ultra (V9) | January 2024 | Symmetric 8 Gbit/s fibre, Wi-Fi 7 |

== Network and technology ==
=== Fixed network ===
Free operates its own national backbone, originally built on leased fibre and on equipment bought cheaply after the bankruptcies of international operators such as WorldCom and KPNQwest. The network, historically known as Proxad, is also used by other companies of the Iliad group. In unbundled areas, subscribers are connected to Free's own equipment in France Télécom's exchanges; in non-unbundled areas, Free long resold the incumbent's wholesale offer, with lower speeds and a reduced television service.

For fibre, Free developed a point-to-point architecture based on Ethernet in the first mile, in which each home is connected by its own fibre. To run cables in the cramped Paris sewers, it used bend-resistant fibre made by the Dutch company Draka. Following the regulatory framework adopted in 2009, which encouraged operators to share the final section of fibre networks, Free also uses networks built by other operators and by local authorities. At the end of 2025, 40.1 million premises in France could be connected to fibre through Free, and fibre accounted for 87.6% of its fixed broadband subscribers.

Free broadband speed milestones (2002–2009)
| Date | Access | Technology | Downstream | Upstream |
|---|---|---|---|---|
| 1999-04-26 | Dial-up | Voiceband | 56 kbit/s | 33.6 kbit/s |
| 2002-02-27 | Dial-up | V.92 | 56 kbit/s | 48 kbit/s |
| 2002-09-19 | ADSL, non-unbundled | ADSL | 512 kbit/s | 128 kbit/s |
| 2003-11-27 | ADSL, unbundled | ADSL | 1,024 kbit/s | 256 kbit/s |
| 2003-12-12 | ADSL, unbundled | ADSL | 2,048 kbit/s | 256 kbit/s |
| 2004-06-04 | ADSL, unbundled | ADSL | 5 Mbit/s | 350 kbit/s |
| 2004-07-27 | ADSL, non-unbundled | ADSL | 2,048 kbit/s | 128 kbit/s |
| 2004-08-24 | ADSL, unbundled | ADSL | 6 Mbit/s | 1 Mbit/s |
| 2004-10-20 | ADSL, unbundled | ADSL2+ | 15 Mbit/s | 1 Mbit/s |
| 2005-01-06 | ADSL, unbundled | ADSL2+ | 20 Mbit/s | 1 Mbit/s |
| 2005-02-09 | ADSL, non-unbundled | ADSL | 10 Mbit/s | 320 kbit/s |
| 2005-07-20 | ADSL, non-unbundled | ADSL | 10 Mbit/s | 1 Mbit/s |
| 2005-11-08 | ADSL, unbundled | ADSL2+ | 24 Mbit/s | 1 Mbit/s |
| 2006-07-26 | ADSL, unbundled | ADSL2+ with Broadcom Nitro | 28 Mbit/s | 1 Mbit/s |
| 2007-06-21 | ADSL, unbundled | ADSL2+ with Broadcom Nitro and PhyR | 28 Mbit/s | 1 Mbit/s |
| 2007-08-31 | FTTH (Paris) | Point-to-point fibre | 100 Mbit/s | 50 Mbit/s |
| 2008-03-20 | ADSL, non-unbundled | ADSL2+ | 22 Mbit/s | 1 Mbit/s |
| 2008-06-26 | FTTH (Montpellier) | Point-to-point fibre | 100 Mbit/s | 50 Mbit/s |
| 2009-12-04 | FTTH (Valenciennes) | Point-to-point fibre | 100 Mbit/s | 50 Mbit/s |

=== IPv6 ===
Free was an early adopter of IPv6. It deployed the protocol across its network in five weeks, from 7 November to 11 December 2007, using a mechanism proposed by the engineer Rémi Després and later standardised as IPv6 rapid deployment (6rd), which carries IPv6 over the existing IPv4 infrastructure; each subscriber received a /60 prefix. A study presented by Google engineers at a RIPE meeting in October 2008 found that Free was probably the largest native IPv6 provider in the world at the time, and that almost all French IPv6 traffic measured came from its customers.

=== Wi-Fi community network ===
In May 2009, Free reconfigured its subscribers' boxes to act by default as public Wi-Fi hotspots, creating one of the largest community Wi-Fi networks in the world, with more than three million access points. The service, called FreeWifi, required authentication and was reserved for Free's broadband and, later, mobile customers; for security reasons, the guest connection was isolated from the subscriber's own network and given a lower priority.

=== Mobile network ===
Free Mobile's network, launched in 2012, initially relied on national roaming on Orange's network while its own antennas were being deployed. In 2019, Iliad sold most of its passive mobile infrastructure in France to Cellnex Telecom. For 5G, Free chose to activate a large number of sites on the 700 MHz band, which gave it wider population coverage than its competitors, at the cost of lower speeds than on the 3.5 GHz band.

== Services ==
=== Internet access ===
Free provides fixed broadband over ADSL, VDSL2 and fibre. Since the late 2010s, the bulk of its subscriber base has moved to fibre, which accounted for 6.7 million of its 7.6 million fixed subscribers at the end of 2025. Its main offers are built around the current Freebox models, the Freebox Pop, the Freebox Ultra and their variants, generally with a promotional price in the first year. Subscribers also receive an e-mail service and, historically, free web hosting for personal pages.

=== Telephone ===
Since July 2003, Freebox subscribers have had unlimited calls to French landlines at no extra cost, an offer later extended to landlines in around 100 countries and, from 2010, to French mobile phones. The introduction of unlimited calls led competitors to follow suit. The service includes an online answering machine, caller ID, call forwarding, call filtering and conference calls. From April 2007, each subscriber was also assigned a separate fax number linked to an online faxing service.

=== Television ===
Free has offered television over its network since 2003. In 2008, the trade publication Light Reading ranked it first among the world's IPTV operators by number of subscribers, a ranking also reported by other industry analysts. Channel access rights are managed without a smart card, through the Access Right Distribution Protocol (ARDP), which Free developed and submitted to the Internet Engineering Task Force. The OQee interface, introduced in 2020, is also available as an application on other devices, and the Freebox offers include bundles of streaming services in the higher tiers.

== Business model and corporate culture ==
Unable to obtain bank credit in its early years, the company had to manage its cash very tightly: large suppliers such as France Télécom, Nokia and Cisco were paid last, smaller ones first, and Freebox units were paid for only on delivery. According to its former chief financial officer, Olivier Rosenfeld, Niel's response to this constraint was to "offer much more with much less". Its network was built with technologies derived from the Internet and with free software, which were cheaper than the proprietary equipment used by traditional operators. The authors of a biography of Niel summarise the group's financial doctrine in two rules: no growth without investment in technology, whether in the network, the box or mobile, and tightly controlled debt as a condition of independence. To reconcile them, Free favoured growth with variable costs, relying first on France Télécom's infrastructure and then gradually bringing its own network closer to subscribers wherever their number made the investment quickly profitable. Each activity thus financed the next: the Minitel financed free Internet access, which financed ADSL, which in turn financed mobile. Rosenfeld summed up the approach by saying that, while telecommunications is usually seen as a business of heavy upfront capital expenditure, Niel also treated it as a business of carefully staggered operating expenditure.

According to Niel, adding services to basic access was the only way to avoid broadband becoming a low-priced commodity, identical across all alternative operators, once unbundling had been introduced. In 2007, Free had the highest EBITDA margin among European broadband providers and a debt ratio well below the industry average. Analysts nonetheless questioned in 2009 the cost of building both a mobile network and an FTTH network at the same time, each estimated at around €1 billion.

The company is known for a flat hierarchy and minimal support functions. At the time of the Alice acquisition in 2008, Free's marketing department had one employee, compared with 35 at Alice, and senior managers shared offices. Most employees were technicians, often trained on the job, and three quarters of them were then under 35. The engineering culture showed in the products: for several years the Freebox displayed "Rock'n'roll" when it started up, until the Freebox Revolution of 2010, and the time 13:37, a reference to leet speak, appeared in advertisements. The group was long organised into many small subsidiaries; until 2008, none had more than 49 employees, the threshold above which French law requires a works council.

== Corporate affairs ==
=== Ownership and management ===
Boukobza left the group in 2007 and moved to Israel, where, as Michael Golan, he later founded the mobile operator Golan Telecom. Rosenfeld also decided to leave in 2007; he recruited his successor as chief financial officer, Thomas Reynaud, ensured the transition until 2008 and remained a member of Iliad's board. Free SAS is wholly owned by Iliad, which since 2021 has been controlled by Maya, the holding company of the Niel family, through Iliad Holding. Free is headed by Nicolas Thomas; Iliad itself is led by chief executive Thomas Reynaud and chaired by Xavier Niel.

=== Subscribers and market share ===
Until the purchase of Alice in 2008, Free's subscriber growth was organic. Free had the lowest churn rate among French broadband providers in the late 2000s, below 1% a month.

Free broadband subscribers and market share (2002–2009)
| Year | Free broadband subscribers | | | | ADSL subscribers in France | | Broadband subscribers in France | |
| Year | Non-unbundled | Unbundled | Total | Unbundling ratio | Total | Free market share | Total | Free market share |
|---|---|---|---|---|---|---|---|---|
| 2002 | 95,000 | 3,000 | 98,000 | 3.1% | 1,361,377 | 7.2% | | |
| 2003 | 320,000 | 153,000 | 473,000 | 32.4% | 2,967,434 | 15.9% | | |
| 2004 | 500,000 | 549,000 | 1,049,000 | 52.4% | 6,072,723 | 17.2% | 6,529,997 | 16.0% |
| 2005 | 475,000 | 1,120,000 | 1,595,000 | 70.2% | 8,881,875 | 17.9% | 9,500,000 | 16.8% |
| 2006 | 548,000 | 1,730,000 | 2,278,000 | 75.9% | 12,019,000 | 19.0% | 12,700,000 | 17.9% |
| 2007 | 537,000 | 2,367,000 | 2,904,000 | 81.5% | 14,741,000 | 19.7% | 15,550,000 | 18.7% |
| 2008 (Note: Including subscribers of Alice, acquired in August 2008.) | 901,132 | 3,323,868 | 4,225,000 | 78.7% | 16,804,000 | 25.1% | 17,819,000 | 23.7% |
| 2009 | 651,000 | 3,805,000 | 4,456,000 | 85.4% | 18,500,000 | 24.1% | 19,690,000 | 22.6% |

=== Business trends ===
The figures below are those of the France segment of the Iliad group, which covers the fixed and mobile services sold under the Free brand (as of the financial year ending 31 December):

| Year | Revenue (€ m) | EBITDAaL (€ m) | Fixed broadband subscribers (m) | of which fibre (m) | Mobile subscribers (m) |
|---|---|---|---|---|---|
| 2022 | 5,555 | 2,287 | 7.18 | 4.66 | 14.22 |
| 2023 | 6,040 | 2,392 | 7.41 | 5.52 | 15.01 |
| 2024 | 6,534 | 2,604 | 7.57 | 6.19 | 15.52 |
| 2025 | 6,626 | 2,636 | 7.6 | 6.7 | 15.7 |

=== Headquarters ===
Free's head office in the 8th arrondissement of Paris

Free's head office is located in the 8th arrondissement of Paris.

=== Advertising and slogans ===
The original logo, featuring a jumping character and the first slogan

The simplified logo, used since 2006

Free has used a series of slogans in its advertising since its launch. In March 2011, a Paris court ruled that the slogan "Il a Free, il a tout compris" was misleading, in proceedings brought by UFC-Que Choisir.

| Year | Original French slogan | Translation |
|---|---|---|
| 1999 | La liberté n'a pas de prix | Freedom has no price |
| 2007 | C'est tout compris | Wordplay: "It's all included" or "It's all understood" |
| 2009 | Il a Free, il a tout compris | "He has Free, he has understood everything", with the same wordplay |
| 2011 | Feel Free | (in English in the original) |
| 2012 | Merci Free ! | Thanks, Free! |

== Controversies and legal issues ==
=== Consumer litigation ===
In February 2006, the Paris tribunal de grande instance ordered Free to pay damages to UFC-Que Choisir and to the association Familles de France after finding 32 clauses of its terms and conditions to be unfair; Free amended its terms a few months later. In March 2011, in a case brought by the same association, the court ordered Free to end several commercial practices it judged unlawful or misleading, including deferred "activation fees" of up to €96 charged to subscribers who cancelled, which it regarded as unjustified termination fees. In February 2012, the Paris criminal court fined Free €100,000 for misleading commercial practices in connection with its triple-play offer of 2005, and ordered it to pay damages to UFC-Que Choisir. Free was also, until the late 2000s, the only French provider to charge a premium rate for calls to its technical support line, a practice criticised by consumer groups.

=== Working conditions ===
Free's employment practices have been the subject of several press investigations. In 2016, the weekly Politis and the news site Mediapart reported on disciplinary dismissals and on the treatment of staff representatives in the group's call centres. In September 2017, the France 2 programme Cash Investigation broadcast an investigation into the management of the call centres run by Iliad's subsidiaries in France and Morocco, alleging the use of dismissals for gross misconduct and pressure on striking employees, notably at a centre in Casablanca in 2012. In the weeks that followed, the directors of three of the group's call centres left their posts, although the link with the broadcast was not established; the management of the centre in question denied that departures had been forced.

=== Data breach and CNIL fine ===
On 13 January 2026, the CNIL fined Free Mobile €27 million and Free €15 million, a total of €42 million, following the cyberattack of October 2024, which had exposed data linked to more than 24 million contracts. The authority found that the authentication of remote access through the companies' VPN was not sufficiently robust, that their systems for detecting abnormal activity were ineffective, that the first notice sent to affected customers lacked essential information, and that data on former subscribers had been kept longer than allowed.

=== Other disputes ===
In October 2022, Arcep fined Free Caraïbe, the group's subsidiary in the French Caribbean, €300,000 for failing to meet its obligations to deploy a very high-speed mobile network in Guadeloupe, French Guiana, Martinique, Saint Barthélemy and Saint Martin.

== See also ==
- Free Mobile
- Freebox
- Iliad SA
- Internet in France
- Telecommunications in France
