= Thein Kyu =

Burmese dental professor

- သိန်းကြူ
- Thein Kyu in 2014

President of the Myanmar Dental Association
- Incumbent
- Assumed office 2016
- Preceded by: Pwint Hpoo

Rector of University of Dental Medicine, Mandalay
- In office 21 February 2011 – 24 February 2012
- Preceded by: Mya Thaw
- Succeeded by: Shwe Toe

Rector of the University of Dental Medicine, Yangon
- In office 2012–2015
- Preceded by: Myo Win
- Succeeded by: Shwe Toe

Personal details
- Born: Rangoon, Burma
- Education: Institute of Dental Medicine, Rangoon (B.D.S, M.D.Sc, Dr.D.Sc, Advanced Clinical Training, Tokyo) D.Sc(Hons.) TOKYO MEDICAL AND DENTAL UNIVERSITY
- Occupation: Professor, President of the MDA

Thein Kyu (Burmese: သိန်းကြူ; born 25 February 1944) is a Myanmar dental professor. Thein Kyu was born in Yangon, Myanmar on 25 February 1944. He served as the rector of University of Dental Medicine, Mandalay from 2010 to 2012 and of University of Dental Medicine, Yangon from 2012 to 2014; he has been the president of the Myanmar Dental Association (MDA) from 2016 to present.

== Early life and education ==
Thein Kyu was born in Yangon, Myanmar. In 2015, he received an Honorary Doctorate from Tokyo Medical and Dental University.

== See also ==
- Myanmar Dental Council
