= Tan Pin Pin =

Singaporean filmmaker

- 陈彬彬
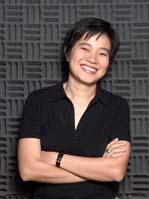
- Born: 1969 (age 56–57); Singapore
- Education: Raffles Girls' Secondary School; Victoria Junior College; University of Oxford; Northwestern University
- Occupation: Filmmaker
- Spouse: 1

Chinese name
- Traditional Chinese: 陳彬彬
- Simplified Chinese: 陈彬彬
Transcriptions
Standard Mandarin
- Hanyu Pinyin: Chén Bīnbīn
- Website: tanpinpin.com

Tan Pin Pin (simplified Chinese: 陈彬彬; traditional Chinese: 陳彬彬; pinyin: Chén Bīnbīn, born 1969) is a Singapore-based film director. She is best known for the documentary film Singapore GaGa (2005). It was the first Singaporean documentary to have a theatrical run. In 2014, her documentary To Singapore, With Love (2013) was denied for all ratings by the Media Development Authority, effectively banning it in Singapore.

== Early life ==
The oldest of three girls, Tan was born to architects in a middle-class neighborhood. Educated at Raffles Girls' Secondary School and Victoria Junior College, Tan was a Loke Cheng Kim scholar. She received her first degree in law from Oxford University, graduating with an M.A. in England, United Kingdom. Subsequently, she received her MFA in film and television from Northwestern University. In her first year at Oxford, she came across photography books, including Robert Frank's The Americans (1958) and August Sander's Citizens of the Twentieth Century (1986), and started taking photographs. After graduation in 1991, she travelled to China with her camera.

Kenneth Paul Tan of the Lee Kuan Yew School of Public Policy states that "Pin was at the start of a trend among a younger generation of filmmakers to use film to examine and maybe even interpret the past, motivated by a sense of loss coming from how quickly Singapore has evolved."

== Career ==
Her films have screened at festivals including Berlin, Busan, Cinéma du Réel, Visions du Réel, Rotterdam and at the Flaherty Seminar. They have also screened on Discovery Channel. In Singapore, they have received sold-out screenings, toured schools and was acquired by Singapore Airlines for their in-flight entertainment services. Her video installations have been shown in the President's Young Talent Show, Singapore Art Show and the Aedes Gallery in Berlin. She has won or been nominated for more than 20 awards. According to Twitchfilm's Stefan, watching Invisible City "made you think, about existentialism, about memories, about immortality." Singapore GaGa, voted the Best Film in 2006 by The Straits Times, is described as "one of the best films about Singapore". Moving House, Pin Pin's thesis film for her Northwestern University MFA, won the Student Academy Award for Best Documentary.

Other awards include two Asian Television Awards, Cinéma du Réel's Prix de la SCAM and Taiwan International Documentary Festival's Asian Vision Award. Her films are distributed by Objectifs Films. She recently completed Yangtze Scribbler and thesaurus. 2015 will see the release of Tan's short film as part of an omnibus to commemorate Singapore's 50th year of independence. Tan joined as a member of the Academy Of Motion Picture Arts and Sciences in 2018.

== Film Community ==
Tan Pin Pin is a founding member of filmcommunitysg, a collective of independent filmmakers in Singapore.

She was on the team in 2011 that lobbied the Singapore Film Commission to include documentaries and films with artistic and cultural merit in the New Talent Feature Grant Scheme. Tan was on the Board of The Substation (2004–2011) and was also on the Board of the National Archives of Singapore (2007–2009).

Tan, with Yuni Hadi, co-founded the Fly by Night Video Challenge which has seen several hundred short films made in the seven years it was run. She has been on film juries of Cinemanila International Film Festival, Jeonju International Film Festival, and DMZ Docs amongst others.

== Films ==
=== Moving House (1996) ===
Moving House (1996) was about the exhumation of Tan's great-grandparents' grave in 1995. The site was off Sixth Avenue in Singapore. This was the first of three documentaries about grave exhumations.

=== microwave (2000) ===
Tan's microwave takes a humorous jab at the world's obsession with everybody's favourite plastic doll. The film was done in a single shot and has screened in multiple festivals around the world.

=== Rogers Park (2001) ===
The 2001 short Rogers Park is a snapshot of the lives of three people – a man, a woman, and a boy. They live under one roof and yet in emotionally separate spaces in Chicago's Rogers Park.

Rogers Park was a Student Academy Awards Regional Finalist, won the Golden Reel Award and the Chicago Filmmaker Award. It also screened at the Clermont Film Festival in France.

=== Moving House (2001) ===
Kenneth Paul Tan states that "Raphaël Millet describes Northwestern University-trained Tan Pin Pin as a 'pioneer' of the documentary genre in Singapore and country, her 22-minute Moving House among the 'first breakthroughs'in a genre that is important for recording the history of 'a young nation still in the making'...... In Singapore GaGa (2005) for instance, Tan captures and then privileges the marvelous diversity, idiosyncrasies and musicality of ordinary voices in Singapore, voices that have mostly been overpowered by the ubiquitous and bland pronouncements of officialdom"

Professor Tan goes on to point out that "Tan's film points to two stages of violence which are visually resonant. At the first stage, in the 1950s-70s, large numbers of Singaporeans living in village communities were dispersed and resettled-sometimes against their will-into modern public housing estates. In the earlier decades, these mass produced high-rise apartment blocks-though clean, safe and convenient- were criticized for alienating the individual, atomizing community and lacking aesthetic character...... The visual and conceptual resemblance between apartment blocks and columbaria is uncanny, and the film does not miss the opportunity to foreground the irony."

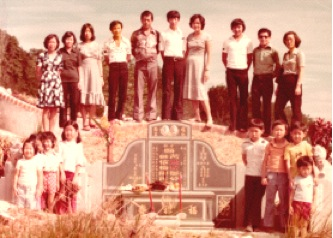
Still from Moving House

Moving House gives an insight into what it is like for one of the 55,000 families in Singapore forced to relocate the remains of their relatives from a cemetery to a columbarium. The film was one of six documentary ideas commissioned by Discovery Networks Asia and is the first documentary it funded that was entirely conceptualised, initiated and directed by a Singaporean

Moving House won the Student Academy Award for Best Documentary, Best Documentary at the USA-Asean Film Festival, an award for Discovery Channel's Asia First Time Filmmaker Award, a Certificate of Merit at the Chicago International Film Festival, and the Documentary Prize at Nextframe.

=== Building Dreams (2002) ===
The 8-part series on the history of Singapore architecture Building Dreams featured two episodes Tan directed – Dawn of a New Era and Spaces of Memory. The pieces showed a rare look inside the dome of the Old Supreme Court Building, Singapore, as well as a house designed by renowned Singaporean architect Ho Kwong Yew. Building Dreams was produced for Arts Central by Xtreme Productions.

=== Gravedigger's Luck (part of Afterlife Series) (2003) ===
Tan released Gravedigger's Luck, part of Discovery Network's Afterlife series. It documents a man who tries multiple luck-enhancing methods to counter the curse of bad luck he believes he has because of his job as a grave exhumer. Gravedigger's Luck was the runner up for Best Documentary at the Asian Television Awards, and the runner up for Best Infotainment Programme. She was the series consultant for the Afterlife series.

=== 80km/h (2004) ===
80km/h is a single continuous take of the 38-minute-long drive across the island of Singapore on the Pan Island Expressway, and the view along the way.

Kenneth Paul Tan states, "This is a 38-minute art film that documents the journey on the Pan Island Expressway (PIE) from the eastern end of Singapore to its Western end, all filmed in one take from a car moving at a constant speed. By reproducing the project ever year, Tan hopes that by 2013 she will be able to 'stack' the ten layers of recordings for 'a real time layered survey of our landscape".

80km/h was shown in the Singapore Short Cuts film programme (2004) jointly organised by National Museum Singapore Cinematheque, the Substation and the Singapore Film Commission.

=== Crossings: John Woo (2004) ===
In 2004, Tan directed Crossings: John Woo, part of the Crossing series commissioned by Discovery Channel, showing the history and life of one of Hollywood's most celebrated directors John Woo. The film showcased rarely seen clips from Woo's earlier works. Crossings: John Woo premiered on Discovery.

=== Singapore GaGa (2005) ===
Singapore GaGa, a survey of Singaporean life as expressed in sounds, is Tan's best-known film. The film is Singapore's first documentary to have a cinema release and it enjoyed a seven-week sold-out run at The Arts House. Apart from being acquired for screening on board Singapore Airlines, it has also played in film festivals around the world. Singapore GaGa was voted Best Film in 2006 by The Straits Times. In January 2016, the film was withdrawn from Malaysia's Titian Budaya Festival in Kuala Lumpur after authorities rejected an appeal to the chief censor to not withdraw a scene where ventriloquist Victor Khoo said "animals" in Malay, as the word has a double meaning. The censor's report added that the "dialogue can create doubt and restlessness among citizens and may finally cause a security threat, disturbance of public peace and national defence".

=== Invisible City (2007) ===
The 2007 documentary Invisible City, chronicles the ways people attempt to leave a mark before they and their histories disappear. Tan interviews people – photographers, journalists, and archaeologists – who are propelled by curiosity to find a City for themselves. '

In a book chapter by Professor Kenneth Paul Tan, Tan Pin Pin's narrative approach is outlined and its impact analysed. "She interviews Ivan Polunin, an English doctor who moved to Singapore in 1948 and was a university lecturer and part-time documentarian for the BBC up to the 1970s, by which time he had produced hundred of hours of film footage capturing, among other things, the lives of fisherman working on kelongs and the Cantonese-speaking heartlands of old Singapore. Tan's interview with the elderly Polunin takes place shortly after he underwent brain surgery, a trauma that has caused him to lose, by his own admission, much 'brainpower'".

The film enjoyed a five-week sold-out run at The Arts House in Singapore and screened at Berlinale, Pusan. Invisible City also won the Prix de la Scam at Cinéma du Réel, and the Asian Vision Award, Merit Award, at the Taiwan International Documentary Festival.

=== The Impossibility of Knowing (2010) ===
The Impossibility of Knowing documents Tan's attempt to capture the aura of spaces in Singapore that have experienced trauma. Tan was among four Asian directors who were commissioned by the DMZ International Documentary Film Festival to make a short film on the theme of "peace, life, and communication". The Impossibility of Knowing premiered on 11 September 2010.

The film also screened at Visions du Réel and the Oberhausen International Short Film Festival.

In November 2015, the film was withdrawn from the Titian Budaya Festival in Kuala Lumpur after Malaysian censors raised issues with it.

=== Snow City (2011) ===
In 2011, Tan released Snow City. Snow City had its international premiere at the Singapore Biennale and was invited to screen in competition at Cinéma du Réel.

=== To Singapore, With Love (2013) ===
In 2013, Tan released To Singapore, With Love, which revolves around political exiles, some of whom have not been home for as long as 50 years. The documentary won Tan the best director award in the Muhr AsiaAfrica documentary section at 10th Dubai International Film Festival and the Best Asean Documentary at the Salaya International Documentary Festival. It was made with the support of the Asian Cinema Fund and the Busan International Film Festival, where it had its world premiere in competition. The film also screened at Malaysia's FreedomFilmFest, the Berlin International Film Festival's Forum programme, Film Society of Lincoln Center, Seoul International Documentary Festival, Brazil's It's All True, Jogja-Netpac Film Festival, International Film Festival of Kerala, Diaspora Film Festival, Incheon and London's SEA ArtsFest, where it enjoyed four sold-out screenings over two days.

The film was banned in Singapore, with the Media Development Authority claiming that it undermined national security as "the individuals in the film have given distorted and untruthful accounts of how they came to leave Singapore and remain outside Singapore," and that "a number of these self-professed 'exiles' were members of, or had provided support to, the proscribed Communist Party of Malaya (CPM)." In response, a group of 39 artists, including filmmakers Anthony Chen, Royston Tan and Kelvin Tong, released a joint statement expressing "deep disappointment" and urged the Media Development Authority to reverse the ban. Tan stated that she would consider re-submitting the film for a rating in the future.

On 2 October 2014, Tan submitted the film, unchanged, to the Media Development Authority's Film Appeals Committee (FAC) to review the film's ban. On 12 November 2014, Tan's review was denied. In a statement, of the 12 FAC members present, nine voted to uphold the classification while the other three voted that the film be given a Restricted 21 (R21) rating instead.

=== 7 Letters (2015) ===
In 2015, Tan directed one out of seven short films in 7 Letters, "Pineapple Town", created to celebrate Singapore's Golden Jubilee. The Straits Times noted that "Tan's work," her first attempt at fiction, "has an allusive, multilayered depth that lingers in the mind after the credits roll". Variety found Tan's segment "at once upfront and nuanced about the complexities of cultural identity".

=== In Time to Come (2017) ===
Tan released In Time to Come in April 2017. Set in Singapore, In Time to Come follows the exhumation of an old Singapore time capsule and the creation of a new one. It reveals items from 25 years ago, such as a bottle of water from the Singapore River and a Yellow Pages directory, while also showing daily life scenes like train commutes and a school fire drill. Significant events, such as the 2014 uprooting of the Banyan tree behind The Substation, are highlighted. The film also captures the selection of items for the new time capsule, including a life jacket and a lion's head mask. The 62-minute film is presented without narration or dialogue.

The film world premieres at Visions du Réel in April 2017. Thereafter, it embarks on a whirlwind tour, travelling to Hot Docs, Canada, É Tudo Verdade, Brazil, and The Art of the Real, Lincoln Centre, USA.

== Visual art ==
Another China (1992) was a photographic survey of China that aimed to capture the lives of ordinary people in China in 1991. The photos were captured by Tan during a 11-week solo trip to China in 1991 that was partially funded by grants from the Oxford University Expeditions Council and Tithes Marketing. Friends, Family and Strangers (1993) was a solo photography exhibition held in Mandarin Hotel from 8–14 February 1993. The photos document typical Singapore life as seen from the perspective of a young person.

walk walk 《走走》 is a public artwork commissioned by the Singapore Art Museum (SAM) for The Everyday Museum and is sited at the Kampong Bahru Bus Terminal (KBBT) in the Spottiswoode Park neighborhood. The installation was unveiled on 29 April 2023 and will remain on display until March 2027. The work comprises video and text installations, with the video installation featuring several women reflecting on the role of walking in their lives. As noted by the South China Morning Post, the work “ruminates on the shifting significance of the act of walking” and on “freedom of movement.”

On a Clear Day You Can See Forever is a two-channel video installation created for Singapore Biennale 2025 installed in Lucky Plaza. One screen shows Inuka, Singapore’s first polar bear born in captivity, moving cyclically within an artificial Arctic habitat. The other screen presents 80km/h (2004), a single-take view along the Pan Island Expressway at a constant speed.

Someday 《总有一天》 is a photo exhibition first presented at Photofairs Shanghai in May 2026. The exhibition showcases 80 selected photos from Tan’s 11-week visit to China in 1991 that were recently rediscovered.

== Activism ==
In June 2010, Tan led a group of Singapore filmmakers to protest the Asian Film Archive's head Tan Bee Thiam's supposed conflict of interest. Their letter led to Tan Bee Thiam's resignation as executive director.

== Filmography ==
- Moving House (1996)
- microwave (2000)
- Rogers Park (2001)
- Moving House (2001)
- Building Dreams (2002)
- Afterlife (2003)
- 80km/h (2004)
- Crossings: John Woo (2004)
- Singapore GaGa (2005)
- Invisible City (2007)
- 9 August (2008)
- The Impossibility of Knowing (2010)
- Snow City (2011)
- remember (2012)
- Yangtze Scribbler (2012)
- To Singapore, With Love (2013)
- Pineapple Town (2015)
- IN TIME TO COME (2017)
