= SPTC =

SPTC may refer to:

- Shanghai public transport card
- Sheffield Pupil Teacher Centre
- Southern Pacific Transportation Company
- St Paul's Theological Centre
- formerly Swaziland Posts and Telecommunications Corporation, now Eswatini Posts and Telecommunications Corporation (EPTC)
