= AGCOM =

Italian government agency

Autorità per le Garanzie nelle Comunicazioni

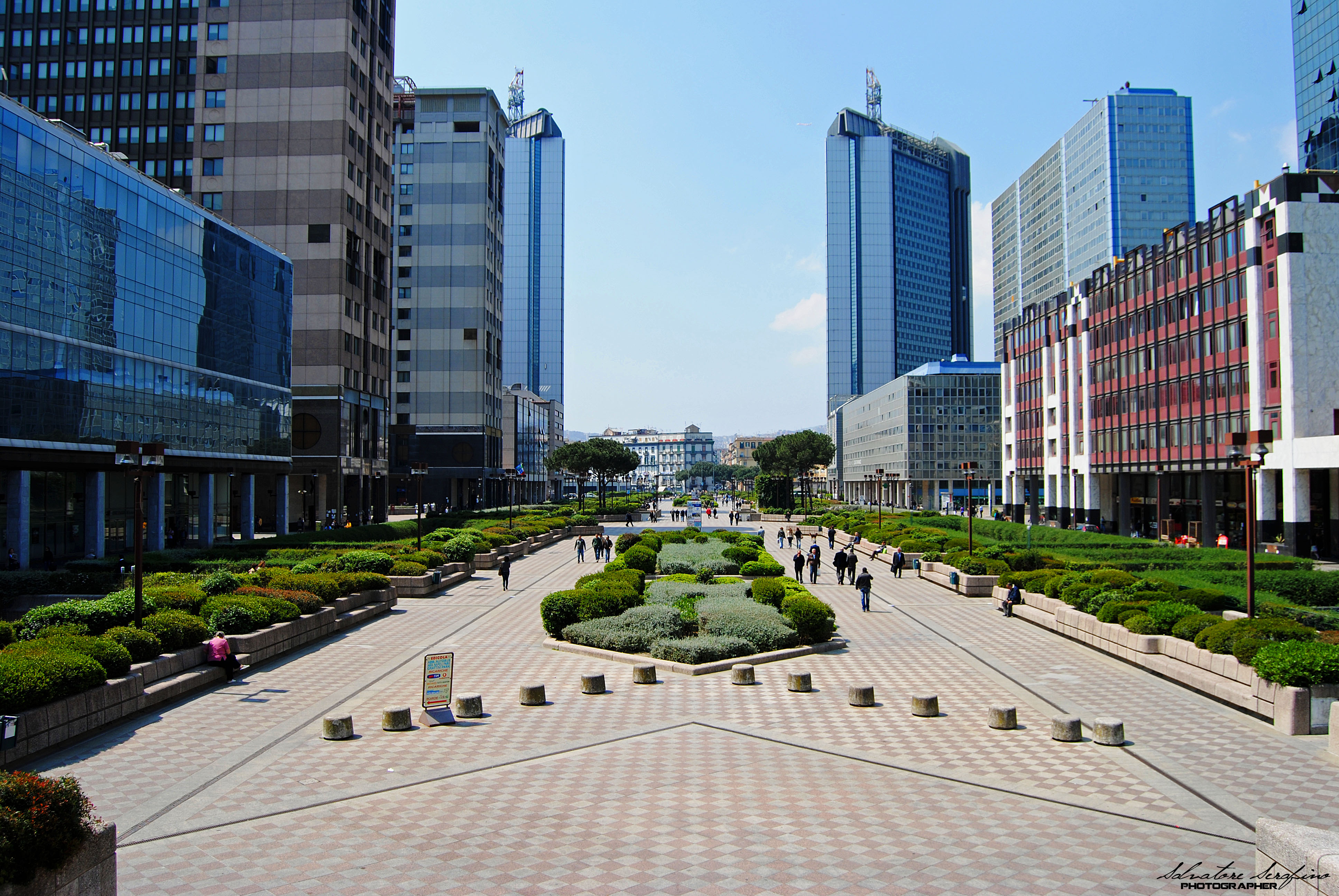
- The business center where the authority is based
- Abbreviation: AGCOM
- Formation: July 31, 1997
- Legal status: Created by law 249 of July 31, 1997
- Purpose: Regulator and competition authority for broadcasting, telecommunications and radiocommunications spectrum
- Headquarters: Directional centre, Naples, Italy
- Location: Naples, Rome
- Region served: Italy
- President: Giacomo Lasorella
- Website: agcom.it

Autorità per le Garanzie nelle Comunicazioni (English: Italian Communications Regulatory Authority; AGCOM) is the national regulatory agency for the communication industries in Italy.

== Administrative leadership ==
The 4 members of Agcom board are elected by the Parliament (2 by the Senate, 2 by the Chamber of Deputies) and consequently the Parliament establish its powers and define its statutes.

== Responsibilities ==
The Authority carries out regulatory and supervisory functions in the areas of telecommunications, television, newspapers, and postal services. Functional branch of the authority are the Regional Committees for Communications (Corecom).

== See also ==
- List of telecommunications regulatory bodies
