= Telecommunications and Post Regulatory Authority =

Government agency in Sudan

Agency overview
- Formed: September 1996
- Jurisdiction: Sudan
- Agency executive: Assadiq Jemaladdin, General Director
- Parent department: Ministry of Telecommunication and Digital Transformation
- Parent agency: Government of Sudan
- Website: tpra.gov.sd/en

The Telecommunications and Post Regulatory Authority (TPRA) is a government agency founded under the Telecommunications and Post Regulating Act, 2018. Telecommunications and Post Regulatory Authority is responsible for regulating all matters related to telecommunications (wire, cellular, satellite and cable), postal services of Sudan.

== See also ==
- List of telecommunications regulatory bodies
- Telecommunications in Sudan
