= General Telecommunications Authority =

Libyan telecommunications regulator

The General Telecommunications Authority was the telecommunications regulator of the Gaddafi government in Libya. It was based in Tripoli, and headed by Muhammad Gaddafi, the oldest son of the ruler.

As of April 2011, it has been reported to have lost de facto control of the telecommunications infrastructure in the rebel-controlled areas of Libya.

== See also ==
- Libya Telecom & Technology
- Free Libyana
