= Eswatini Posts and Telecommunications Corporation =

- Industry: Postal service; Telecommunications
- Founded: April 1986
- Headquarters: Mbabane
- Key people: Themba Khumalo (Managing Director); Mtiti M. Fakudze (Board Chairman); Khulile Dlamini (Chief Marketing Officer); Lindiwe Nxumalo (Chief Finance Officer); Fulatsa Zwane (Chief Techn. & Infor. Officer)
- Products: Mail services; Telecommunications services; Internet services; Courier and freight service
- Number of employees: ~800
- Website: www.eptc.co.sz

Eswatini Posts and Telecommunications Corporation is an Eswatini (Swaziland) company that provides the two services under one corporate umbrella. The company, known as EPTC, is divided into four units: Eswatini Post, Eswatini Telecom, Phutfumani Couriers and National Contact Centre (NCC). The EPTC is a parastatal company and is responsible to the Ministry of Information, Communications and Technology. Eswatini Mobile and MTN Eswatini, a subsidiary of MTN Telecom in South Africa, are competitors to the company.

== Eswatini Post ==
The post division offers modern mail service for letters, packets or other postal documents including post boxes, customs clearance, transport insurance or worldwide tracking and tracing.

EswatiniPost also offers money transfer by postal order or money order from person to person through all domestic post offices and also to neighbouring countries like South Africa, Lesotho and Botswana.

EswatiniPost also provides agency services on behalf of other companies. Agency services are provided throughout the postal network. The post offices sell contracts and receive payments for companies such as Eswatini Electricity Company (EEC), Eswatini Water Services Corporation (EWCS), Eswatini Television Authority (ESTVA) or EswatiniTelecom. There are also Internet Cafés with access to high-speed Internet in all communication centres and selected post offices.

== Eswatini Telecom ==
EswatiniTelecom offers telecom and internet services. Eswatini Telecom provides the spectrum of quality global telecommunication services with direct dialing to over 200 countries and a 24-hour operator assisted service. It offers ADSL (Asymmetric Digital Subscriber Line) Broadband, a high speed, 'always on' Internet access service to send and receive data at speeds surpassing conventional dial-up connection. It also provides high performance at low cost and is suitable for small to medium companies, as well as home use. The ADSL services can simultaneously be connected to the Internet while making and receiving calls. Connection is continuous and monthly consumption may be checked by logging onto portal.swazi.net. ADSL broadband is also provided by Internet service providers that sell on to customers.

== Phutfumani Couriers ==
Phutfumani Couriers is a domestic and international courier and freight service. Contract customers can arrange pick-ups and deliveries according to schedule. All other customers can drop off their shipments at the existing Phutfumani Couriers offices or the nearest post office.

== National Contact Centre (NCC) ==
The National Contact Centre Limited (NCC) is a business unit within the Royal Science and technology Park, based in Phocweni, Matsapha. In line with pursuing His Majesty King Mswati III's Vision 2022, the NCC seeks to address challenges within the rapidly changing business environment. Without exception, businesses are looking for a way to minimise costs whilst maximising profits, hence, many international companies are adopting business process outsourcing.

== See also ==
- Postal codes in Eswatini

== Logos of the units of Eswatini Posts and Telecommunications Corporation ==
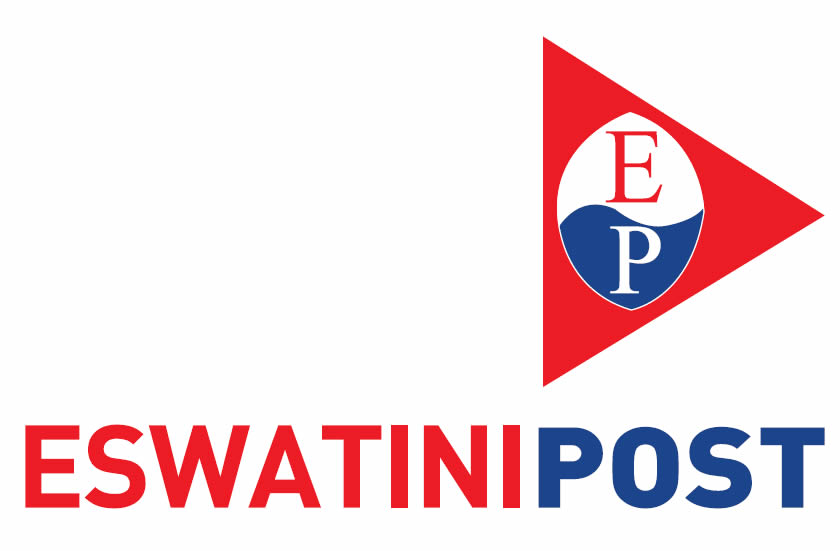

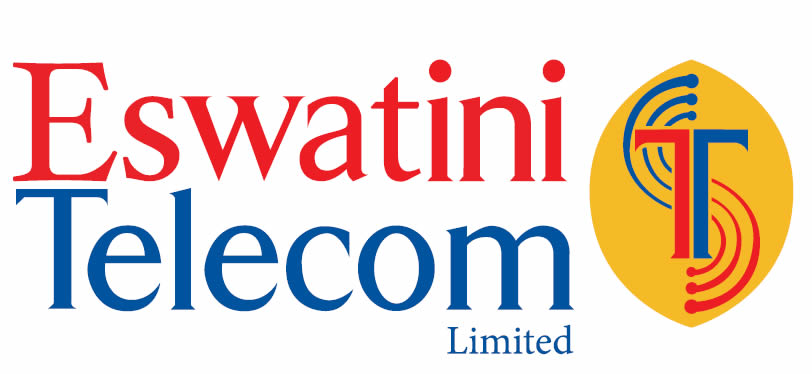

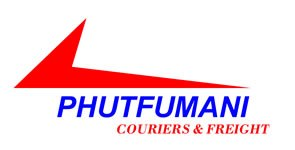

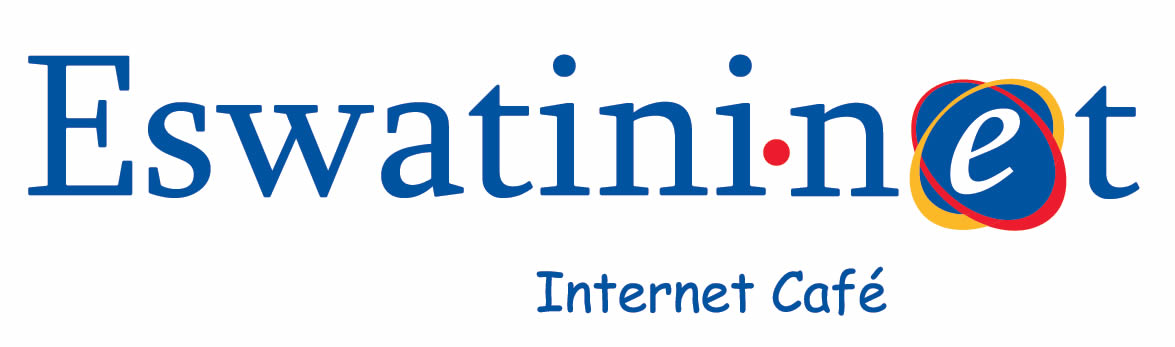
