= Free Libyana =

Free Libyana or Libyana Al Hura is a mobile telephone network in Eastern Libya. It was created during the Libyan Civil War by disconnecting part of the Libyana mobile phone network from its central control in Tripoli and placing it under new control as an independent network.
