= Postal codes in Eswatini =

Postal codes in Eswatini are alphanumeric postal codes. They consist of 1 letter and 3 digits. The first letter indicates the region and the last three digits indicate the place or city.

== List of postal codes ==
Hhohho Region		Manzini Region		Shiselweni Region		Lubombo Region	
Mbabane	H100	Manzini	M200	Nhlangano	S400	Siteki	L300
Swazi Plaza	H101	Kwaluseni	M201	Hlatikhulu	S401	Simunye	L301
Sandla	H102	Matsapha	M202	Kubuta	S402	Maphiveni	L302
Eveni	H103	Ludzeludze	M203	Eluqolweni	S403	Lomahasha	L303
Motshane	H104	Malkerns	M204	Esandleni	S404	Ehlane	L304
Ngwenya	H105	Luyengo	M205	Ntjaneni	S405	Ngomane	L305
Ezulwini	H106	Mankayane	M206	Mahamba	S406	Shewula	L306
Lobamba	H107	Encabaneni	M207	Dwaleni	S407	Mpaka	L307
Piggs Peak	H108	Mahlangatsha	M208	Mhlosheni	S408	Tshaneni	L308
Bulembu	H109	Luve	M209	Hluti	S409	Mhlume	L309
Enkhaba	H110	Mhlatuze	M210	Lavumisa	S410	Vuvulane	L310
Mayiwane	H111	Sithobela	M211	Matsanjeni	S411	Big Bend	L311
Herefords	H112	Kandinda	M212	Magubheleni	S412	Matata	L312
Ngonini	H113	Mzimpofu	M213	Gege	S413	Nsoko	L313
Entfonjeni	H114	Siphofaneni	M214	Zombodze	S414	Sivunge	L314
Mhlambanyatsi	H115	Croydon	M215	Sigwe	S415	Mpholonjeni	L315
Bhunya	H116	Sidvokodvo	M216			Maphungwane	L316
Siphocosini	H117	Kaphunga	M217			Mambane	L317
Dlangeni	H118	Phocweni	M218				
Sandlane	H119	St Georges Barracks	M219				
Emangweni	H120	Mliba	M220				
