= National Communication Authority of Somalia =

Communication Sector

National Communications Authority of Somalia
Agency overview
- Formed: 2018
- Jurisdiction: Government of Somalia
- Headquarters: NCA Headquarters Mogadishu
- Agency executive: Mustafa Y. Sheik, Director General
- Website: https://www.nca.gov.so/

The National Communications Authority of Somalia (NCA) is the regulatory body for the communications sector in Somalia. NCA was established through the Communications Act of 2017 and its mandate is to regulate the communications sector including telecommunications, internet, broadcasting, information and communications technology (ICT) and e-commerce.

The NCA is responsible for facilitating the development of the ICT sector, enabling and ensuring fair and sustainable competition, carrier interconnection, transparency in the implementation of the Communication Law, protecting consumer interest and rights, and maintaining its role as an independent regulator.

On 19 November 2022, the Prime Minister of Somalia Hamza Abdi Barre appointed Mustafa Y. Sheik as the General Manager of the NCA

== Interconnection agreement ==
On 5 December 2022, NCA General Manager Mustafa Y. Sheik and the Somali telecom companies signed an interconnection agreement, allowing customers of the various telecom operators in the country to call each other across different networks. Somalia's National Communications Authority (NCA) confirmed that operators have implemented an interconnection agreement signed in December 2022, allowing seamless call placement across various mobile networks. The agreement, partially implemented by Hormuud Telecom, Somtel, Amtel, SomLink, Golis Telecommunications, and Telesom, came into effect on 10 January. "The successful interconnection among the six operators is a significant achievement for the telecom industry in Somalia. Therefore, this will promote competition, reduce prices, and provide more options for customers," said Mustafa Y. Sheik, the NCA general manager. "We applaud the operators' efforts in completing this important milestone and encourage them to continue collaborating to benefit the industry and consumers."

== National 5G strategy ==
On 19 September 2023: The National Communications Authority of Somalia (NCA) has launched a consultation process for its National 5G Strategy, aiming to transform the country into a new age of connectivity, innovation, and prosperity. The strategy focuses on deploying 5G infrastructure nationwide, ensuring equitable and affordable access to internet and communication services. It aligns with the NCA's Board of Directors' directive and aims to harmonize spectrum integrations across various bands, emphasizing ecosystem readiness. The strategy envisions a transformative, digitally prosperous future for Somalia.

MARCH 20 2024: Hormuud Telecom, Somalia's leading telecommunications provider, unveiled its 5G network, joining Kenya and Ethiopia as African countries to roll out the technology.

== Spectrum monitoring operations centre ==
The National Communications Authority (NCA) has launched its spectrum monitoring operations centre (SMOC), which will monitor and analyze spectrum usage, identify unauthorized or illegal activities, and resolve interference issues promptly. The center will provide real-time data and insights to support informed decision-making and optimize resource allocation. The NCA aims to revolutionize spectrum monitoring and management due to the rapid expansion of telecommunications infrastructure and the proliferation of wireless technologies, fostering innovation and fair competition.

== Starlink license ==
On 8 March 2023, Starlink submitted a request for license to start operations in Somalis and plans to launch commercial services in Somalia.

NCA, welcomed in statement the Starlink’s interest in Somalia. However, pointed out that the company must first meet the necessary licensing requirements and go through the licensing process of the authority. The NCA will be responsible for evaluating Starlink’s offer and the service plan it wishes to implement in the country.

== ISO certifications ==
Somalia’s National Communications Authority (NCA) has secured the ISO 9001:2015 Certification, complying with international standards, Somalia's telecom regulator becomes first ISO-certified government institution as reported by the Somali News Agency. The NCA said the regulator had received this certification after undergoing an evaluation process that includes a quality management system development and a management system documentation review. The Authority has further announced that it has security more ISO Certificatios including ISO 27001:2022 - Information Security Management System (ISMS), and ISO 27701:2019 - Privacy Information Management System (PIMS).

NCA Director General Mustafa Y. Sheik said the certifications reflect the Authority’s dedication and efficiency in delivering on their mandate. "Acquiring these international ISO certifications is no easy feat. It represents a significant achievement for our agency and reflects the dedication and efficiency that underpin our work," he said.

== See also ==
- List of telecommunications regulatory bodies
