= Media Development Authority =

Statutory board in Singapore

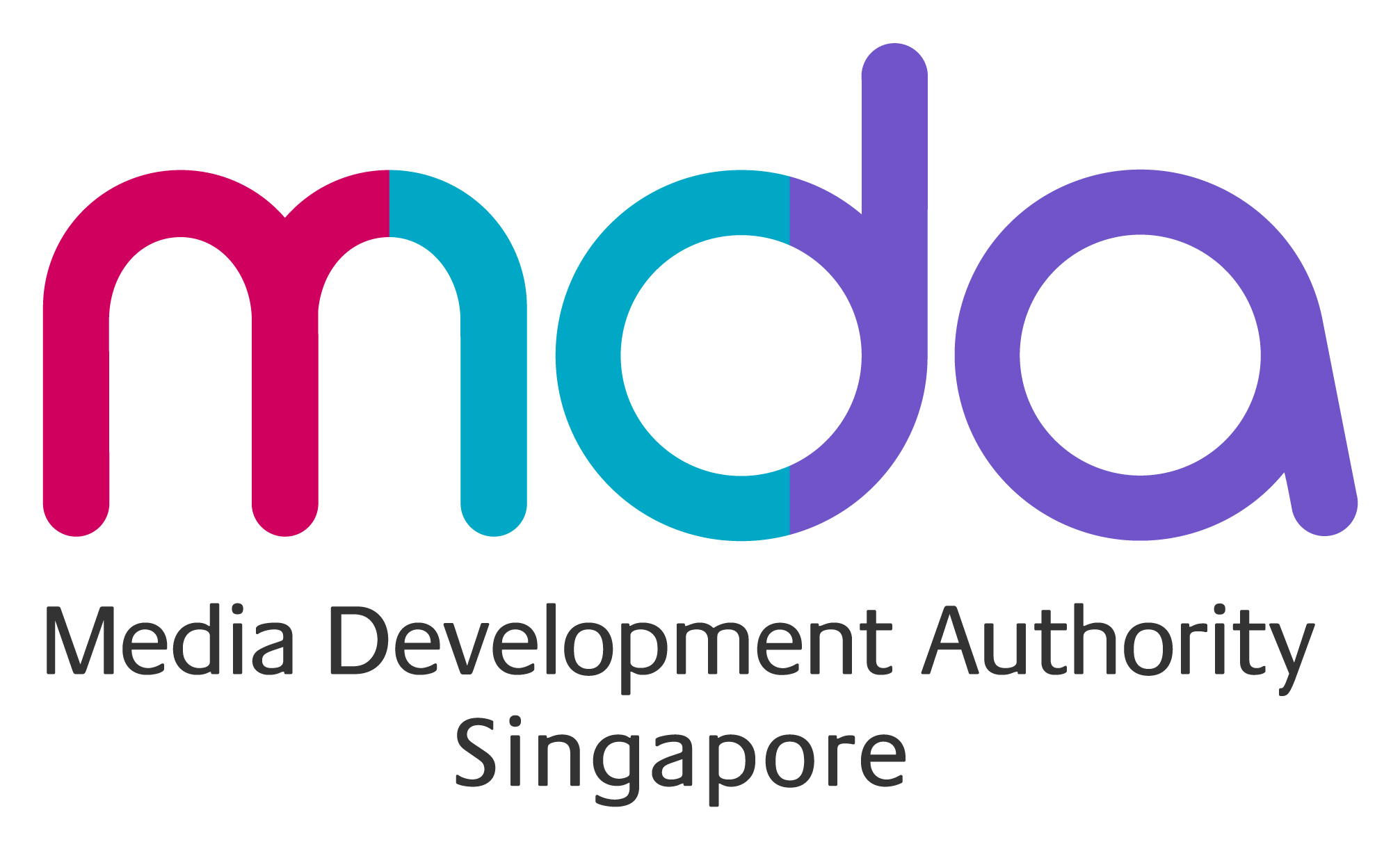
- Logo used from 2003 to 2016

Agency overview
- Formed: 1 January 2003; 23 years ago
- Preceding agencies: Singapore Broadcasting Authority (SBA); Films and Publications Department (FPD); Singapore Film Commission (SFC)
- Dissolved: 1 October 2016; 9 years ago
- Superseding agency: Infocomm Media Development Authority of Singapore (IMDA)
- Jurisdiction: Government of Singapore
- Agency executives: Niam Chiang Meng, chairman; Gabriel Lim, CEO
- Parent agency: Ministry of Communications and Information
- Website: www.mda.gov.sg (archived March 2016)
- Agency ID: T08GB0030D

The Media Development Authority (MDA) was a statutory board of the Singapore Government, under the Ministry of Communications and Information (MCI).

== History ==
MDA was founded on 1 January 2003 by the merger of Singapore Broadcasting Authority (SBA), the Films and Publications Department (FPD) and the Singapore Film Commission (SFC), in response to a national call to develop a globally competitive media industry in Singapore. An industry blueprint called Media 21 was also drawn up and eventually endorsed by the 2002 Economic Review Committee (chaired by then Deputy Prime Minister Lee Hsien Loong), as part of the Creative Industries Development Strategy to propel the growth of Singapore’s creative economy.

One of its major roles is to grow the media industry by creating jobs, attracting investments as well as setting standards.

On 18 January 2016, the Ministry of Communications and Information (MCI) announced that the Infocomm Development Authority of Singapore (IDA) and MDA would be restructured into two new entities: the Infocomm Media Development Authority (IMDA) and the Government Technology Organisation (GTO), in the second half of 2016.

== Preceding statutory boards ==
=== Singapore Broadcasting Authority ===
Prior to the merger, SBA, which was formed on 1 October 1994 under the purview of the previous Ministry of Information and the Arts (MITA), was set up to regulate the broadcasting industry in Singapore.

=== Films and Publications Department ===
FPD was set up as a department under the then MITA to regulate the content of films and publications on 1 January 1998. The Board of Film Censors was a part of the FPD, responsible for classification of films and videos.

=== Singapore Film Commission ===
Following the footsteps of film promotion in other countries, the SFC was established on 15 April 1998. Following the release of the recommendations under Media 21, SFC was merged under the MDA in 2003.

== Roles of MDA ==
The Media Development Authority is responsible for promoting and regulating the Singapore media sector. MDA’s function is to grow the media industry by stimulating job creation, seeding and attracting investments, while setting standards that lay the foundation for building a cohesive and inclusive society.

== Industry developer ==
One of MDA's key initiatives is to develop industry roadmaps that position Singapore as the nucleus where media content, services and applications are financed, made and traded for the world. Media 21 was the first roadmap established by MDA in 2003 in response to global media convergence. More recently, the Singapore Media Fusion Plan (SMFP), a national media development blueprint, was launched in 2009 to create the best environment in Singapore for media businesses to exploit new opportunities in digital media and move up the value chain, while enhancing the global appeal of Singapore media through international partnerships.

In 2011, MDA also revised its funding schemes. In 2013, it had five main schemes: Production Assistance, Development Assistance, Marketing Assistance, Talent Assistance and Enterprise Assistance to help support different stages of a project. These schemes are applicable to projects across various sectors such as film, animation, interactive media, games, publishing, broadcast and music.

== Next-generation media regulator ==
Another key responsibility of MDA is to create and enforce regulatory policies that make Singapore an attractive place to encourage investment and innovation in the media sector, leading to more choices for consumers.

Since the 1990s (under the purview of SBA), it has seen itself leading the charge to address the latest challenges and opportunities faced by the media industry posed by media convergence and a digital media era through convergence regulation. For example, it was the first to articulate Internet policies and establish digital audio broadcasting standards in Southeast Asia.

Its regulatory approach gradually shifted towards industry co-regulation and consultation to stimulate industry growth and yet serve the public interest for a maximum number of households in Singapore. Their focus appears to be to design policy frameworks that facilitate industry growth, whilst enabling informed choices and protecting the young from undesirable content.

A key challenge for the regulator is how to ensure its policies keep in-step with community values to bring about community-led content standards, whilst providing an excellent level of customer responsiveness to customers. Recent examples include the introduction of new ratings under their content classification standards (e.g. PG13), and previously SBA’s Class Licence Scheme.

Like regulators in developed countries like Australia and the UK, MDA works with other public agencies and various community groups to raise media literacy standards through public education initiatives to nurture a media savvy and connected society. MDA has initiated programmes that help to cultivate critical media awareness skills and cyber wellness values.

== Criticism ==
Restrictions on freedom of speech and assembly are enforced by MDA.

In 2005, the MDA withheld the licence for Benny Lim's play Human Lefts unless some scenes were edited and all references to the death penalty removed. The play was originally written about the hanging of Shanmugam Murugesu and was to have been staged one day after the controversial execution of Australian national Nguyen Tuong Van. In August 2006, a play Smegma was banned by the MDA which said that "the play portrays Muslims in a negative light."

In May 2013, the MDA announced its new compulsory license scheme for news websites with significant reach that report Singapore news. These sites must put up a performance bond of S$50,000 and are expected to remove content that is in breach of MDA standards within 24 hours, once notified to do so. This move was heavily criticised by more than 20 activists and bloggers who pointed out that the scheme would impact citizens’ ability to "receive diverse news information".

In May 2014, 45 major arts groups released a paper strongly objecting to MDA's proposed optional scheme to train arts practitioners as "content assessors" to ensure compliance with the authority's classification guidelines. Such practitioners whose groups' "content assessors" mis-classify performances would face a fine of up to $5,000, and may have their licences revoked. The arts groups rejected such "co-regulation" as promoting self-censorship.

On 10 September 2014, Tan Pin Pin's award-winning documentary To Singapore, With Love was banned in Singapore, with the MDA claiming that it undermined national security as "the individuals in the film have given distorted and untruthful accounts of how they came to leave Singapore and remain outside Singapore," and that "a number of these self-professed 'exiles' were members of, or had provided support to, the proscribed Communist Party of Malaya (CPM)." In response, a group of 39 artists, including filmmakers Anthony Chen, Royston Tan and Kelvin Tong, released a joint statement expressing "deep disappointment" and urged the MDA to reverse the ban. On 2 October 2014, Tan submitted To Singapore, With Love, unchanged, to the MDA's Film Appeals Committee to review the film's ban. In a statement, Tan wrote, "As we approach our 50th birthday, I feel that we as a people should be able to view and weigh for ourselves, through legitimate public screenings in Singapore, differing views about our past, even views that the government disagrees with. I hope that Film Appeals Committee will see the film and review the classification in this light." On 12 November 2014, Tan's review was denied. In a statement, the chairman of the Film Appeals Committee (FAC) said, "While of commendable artistic standard, the FAC found the film to be a one-sided account with minimal attempts to provide a balanced mix of views beyond those provided by the interviewees featured in the film". Of the 12 FAC members present, nine voted to uphold the classification while the other three voted that the film be given a Restricted 21 (R21) rating instead.

In June 2016, the MDA objected to 31 photographs in Iranian photojournalist Newsha Tavakolian's I Know Why the Rebel Sings exhibition, as part of the Singapore International Festival of Arts pre-festival The O.P.E.N. programme, as they featured "female kurdish members from a terrorist-linked organisation, who had committed acts of violence to further their cause, for example suicide bombing." 15 of these photographs made it to the final cut of the exhibition and were disallowed. Festival director Ong Keng Sen issued a statement condemning MDA's explanation and pointing out that the photographs were already published in the readily accessible Time magazine, both online and off. He also pointed out the photos depicted the kurdish soldiers fighting ISIS, a greater evil. "And so we are living with a new terror where we don’t know, it is out of our control," he said at the exhibition's launch.

== See also ==
- Mediacorp
