= Myo Win =

- မျိုးဝင်း

Rector of the University of Dental Medicine, Yangon
- In office 2008–2012
- Preceded by: Ba Myint
- Succeeded by: Thein Kyu

Personal details
- Born: 13 November 1952 (age 73) Rangoon, Burma
- Education: Institute of Dental Medicine, Rangoon (B.D.S., M.Sc., M.Phil., F.I.C.D.)
- Occupation: Professor, rector of the University of Dental Medicine, Yangon

Myo Win (Burmese: မျိုးဝင်း; born 13 November 1952) is a Burmese dental professor who served as Rector of the University of Dental Medicine, Yangon from 2008 to 2012. He is the coordinator of the first private orthodontic training program in Myanmar.

== Early life and education ==
Myo Win was born in Yangon, Myanmar on 13 November 1952. He graduated from University of Dental Medicine, Yangon in July, 1972. He received M.Sc and M.Phil from London in 1990.
