= Autorité de Régulation des Communications Électroniques et de la Poste (Niger) =

The Autorité de Régulation des Communications Électroniques et de la Poste (ARCEP) is an independent agency in charge of regulating telecommunications and postal services in Niger.
