= Autorité de Régulation des Communications Électroniques et des Postes (Gabon) =

- ARCEP

Agency overview
- Jurisdiction: Government of Gabon
- Headquarters: Libreville, Gabon
- Agency executive: President / Director General
- Parent department: Ministry of Digital Economy (if applicable)
- Website: www.arcep.ga

The Autorité de Régulation des Communications Électroniques et des Postes (ARCEP) is an independent agency in charge of regulating telecommunications and postal services in Gabon.
