= Autorité de Régulation des Communications Électroniques et des Postes (Togo) =

The Regulatory Authority for Electronic Communications and Postal Services (ARCEP) is an independent Togolese administrative authority responsible for regulating the electronic communications and postal services sectors. Established in its current form by Law N° 2012-018 of December 17, 2012, it succeeded the Regulatory Authority for the Postal and Telecommunications Sectors (ART&P), which had been operational since January 2000.

== Historic ==
=== Origins : From ART&P to ARCEP ===
Telecommunications regulation in Togo is primarily the responsibility of the Regulatory Authority for the Postal and Telecommunications Sectors (ART&P), which was established in 1998 and became operational in January 2000.

Operating under the supervision of the Ministry of the Digital Economy and Digital Transformation, ARCEP's primary missions are to ensure fair and sustainable competition in regulated markets, to manage scarce resources (radio frequencies, numbering plans, the “.tg” internet domain), issuing operating licenses, ensuring the quality of services offered to consumers, and serving as the designated authority for electronic certification.

Law N° 2012-018 of December 17, 2012, on Electronic Communications (LCE) profoundly transformed the institutional framework by establishing ARCEP. This law, amended by Law No. 2013-003 of February 19, 2019, aims to adapt regulation to technological changes and the convergence of telecommunications, audiovisual media, and information technology.

In November 2015, a new regulatory text was signed to “improve the operating and governance mechanisms” of the regulatory body. Then, in August 2017, a decree completed the transformation of ART&P into ARCEP, entrusting it with the joint regulation of electronic communications and postal services.

Its headquarters, a 6,200-square-meter contemporary-style building, was inaugurated on August 7, 2019, in Lomé’s new administrative district. Since October 23, 2020, the Director General of ARCEP has been Michel Yaovi Galley, a civil engineer specializing in electronics and telecommunications.

==== Strengthening and modernization (since 2019) ====
The inauguration of the new headquarters on August 7, 2019, by Prime Minister Komi Selom Klassou marks a symbolic milestone. With a total cost of 2.2 billion CFA francs, financed by the institution's own funds, the seven-story building includes offices, a conference room, several meeting rooms, a room for the Executive Committee, and technical facilities. It also houses the equipment and staff of the National Agency for the Spectrum and Radio Frequencies (ANSR).

ARCEP is an independent administrative authority created to regulate markets in a context of modernization and technological evolution. Its powers are reinforced by the Electronic Transactions Act (LTE), particularly regarding electronic certification. The organization is ISO 9001-2015 certified, attesting to its quality policy.

== Missions ==
In accordance with Law N° 2012-018, ARCEP is responsible for several key tasks :

- Management and oversight of operators: authorizing and supervising operators of electronic communications networks and services open to the public.
- Issuance of authorizations: granting licenses for independent networks, approval of terminal equipment and installers, and registration certificates for value-added service providers.
- Management of scarce resources: assignment of radio frequencies, administration of the national numbering plan, and management of the national “.tg” internet domain.
- Delegated authority for electronic certification: accreditation of compliance auditors and qualification of electronic certification service providers.
- Protection of consumer rights: monitoring of quality of service (QoS), satisfaction surveys, provision of a price comparison tool/simulator and an alert service.
- Representation of the State in international organizations dealing with electronic communications and postal services.

For the 2024 period, training postal sector stakeholders in regulation was also a key activity of the regulator.

== Organization ==
Section 66 of Law No. 2012-018 defines ARCEP's organizational structure, which consists of two main bodies:

=== The Executive Committee ===
A collegial body responsible for providing impetus and guidance, it consists of five members: four appointed by presidential decree issued by the Council of Ministers and one designated by the National Assembly. The Committee defines and adopts the institution's action plan and strategic priorities. Members are appointed for a three-year term, renewable once.

By Decree N° 2020-023 of April 7, 2020, the President of the Republic appointed four members of the Executive Committee, including Haringa Yaou Tcheyi, a telecommunications engineer, who serves as its chair. On June 9, 2020, the members of the Committee took the oath of office before the Administrative Chamber of the Lomé Court of Appeals, formalizing their assumption of office.

=== The General Management ===
The General Management is responsible for implementing the decisions of the Executive Committee and for the operational management of the institution. Since October 23, 2020, it has been led by Michel Yaovi Galley, a civil engineer specializing in electronics and telecommunications and a graduate of the École polytechnique de Bruxelles. Prior to his appointment, he gained some twenty years of experience at consulting firms (Capgemini, Devoteam, Sopra Steria, Tech Mahindra) and telecommunications operators such as Orange Belgium and Togocom, and served as Technical Advisor to the Minister of the Digital Economy.

== Regulation ==
=== Penalties ===
Under the leadership of Michel Yaovi Galley starting in 2020, ARCEP initiated several enforcement proceedings against operators for failing to meet their obligations regarding service availability and quality. In 2023, a campaign to measure mobile service quality, conducted between November 2022 and January 2023, showed that the quality of voice and internet services provided by Togo Cellulaire and Moov Africa Togo had not improved significantly, leading to new sanctions.

=== Simplification of the fee structure ===
On April 5, 2023, the Council of Ministers adopted a draft decree to streamline the fee structure—one of the regulator's sources of revenue—in order to facilitate collection and support the sector's growth.

== International Cooperation ==
=== Cross-border frequency coordination ===
In September 2025, a delegation from ARCEP Togo, led by Awutey Dodji Sylvanus, participated in a bilateral frequency coordination meeting in Accra with Ghana's National Communications Authority (NCA). The meeting aimed to resolve issues of interference and signal overlap along the border, in accordance with the recommendations of the International Telecommunication Union (ITU) and the guidelines of ECOWAS and the African Telecommunications Union (ATU).

=== Regional integration and free roaming ===
ARCEP is actively involved in the integration of regional telecommunications markets. With the entry into force of the free-roaming agreements between Togo and Ghana, users can now make cross-border calls at no extra cost—a system already in place with Benin and, more recently, Burkina Faso.

=== Leadership sous-régional ===
On April 28, 2026, Michel Yaovi Galley, Director General of ARCEP Togo, was elected president of the Association of West African Telecommunications Regulators (ARTAO), thereby strengthening Togo's position within the West African regulatory landscape.
