= Autorité de Régulation des Communications Électroniques et des Postes (Burkina Faso) =

The Autorité de Régulation des Communications Électroniques et des Postes (ARCEP) is an independent agency in charge of regulating telecommunications and postal services in Burkina Faso.
