= Autorité de Régulation des Communications Électroniques et de la Poste (Chad) =

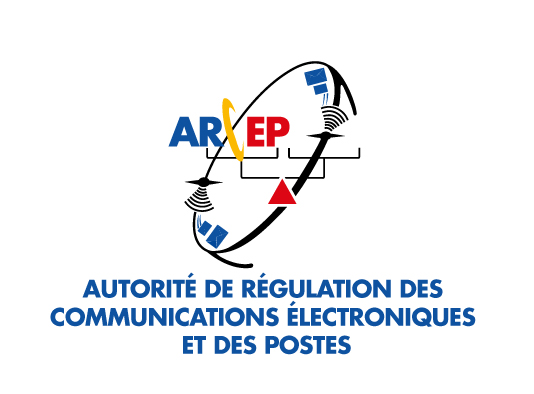
Arcep Tchad

The Autorité de Régulation des Communications Électroniques et des Postes (ARCEP) is an independent agency in charge of regulating telecommunications and postal services in Chad.
