= Myanmar Dental Association =

Burmese professional association

- မြန်မာနိုင်ငံ သွားနှင့်ခံတွင်း ဆရာဝန်အသင်း
- Formation: 1979
- Type: Professional association
- Headquarters: Yangon, Myanmar
- Location: Myanmar
- Members: 4,001
- Official language: English and Burmese
- President: Myint Htain
- Staff: 25

The Myanmar Dental Association (Burmese: မြန်မာနိုင်ငံ သွားနှင့်ခံတွင်း ဆရာဝန်အသင်း; MDA) is a professional association established in 1979 which has more than 4,000 members. The association publishes Myanmar Dental Journal every year. It arranges Myanmar Dental Conference in which FDI World Dental Federation speakers also make their presentations. Myanmar Dental Association and Myanmar Dental Council are the only two professional organizations for Myanmar dentists.

== Leadership ==
Past presidents of the organisation include:

1. Aung Than (1979–1984)
2. Khin Mg Lay (1985–1995)
3. Myint Naing (1996–1998)
4. Ba Myint (1998–2008)
5. Thein Tut (2009–2011)
6. Pwint Hpoo (2012–2015)
7. Thein Kyu (2016–2019)
8. Myint Htain (2020-present)

== See also ==
- Dentistry
- University of Dental Medicine, Mandalay
- University of Dental Medicine, Yangon
- Myanmar Dental Council
- Myanmar Dental Association (Yangon Region)
