= FreedomFilmFest =

Annual documentary film festival in Malaysia

FreedomFilmFest, also known as The KOMAS Freedom Film Festival (FFF), is the first annual documentary film festival in Malaysia. Established in 2003, it adopts the themes encompassed in the Universal Declaration of Human Rights (UDHR), pioneering a documentary film competition method in Malaysia which encourages first-time film makers to turn their winning proposals into films.

FreedomFilmFest (FFF) is organized by KOMAS (Pusat Komuniti Masyarakat), a popular communications human rights center set up in August 1993 to service the organizing needs of grassroots communities and civil society organizations.

FFF was held in Penang for the first time in 2006 and subsequently have been brought to Johor and Kuching, Sarawak. A retrospective of the winning films were also screened in London in 2009
