= University of Dental Medicine, Yangon =

Coordinates: 16°50′3.2″N 96°12′32.3″E

- သွားဘက်‌ဆိုင်ရာဆေးတက္ကသိုလ်(ရန်ကုန်)
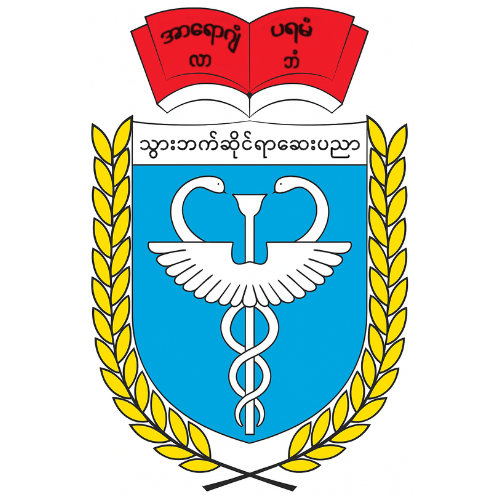
- Shield of UDMY
- Motto: ပြည်သူ့အတွက် ထက်မြက်ကျွမ်းကျင် သွားဆရာဝန် - (Dentist: Competency and Community-Oriented)
- Type: public
- Established: 1964; 62 years ago
- Affiliations: Ministry of Health
- Rector: Kyaw Thiha, (2025 June – Present)
- Students: 761
- Location: Thingangyun 11071, Yangon; Yangon Division, Myanmar
- Website: www.udmyangon-edu.com

The University of Dental Medicine, Yangon (Burmese: သွားဘက်‌ဆိုင်ရာ ဆေး တက္ကသိုလ် (ရန်ကုန်) is the leading university of dental medicine, located in Yangon, Myanmar. The university, along with the University of Dental Medicine, Mandalay, is one of only two universities of dental medicine in the country. The annual intake into both dental universities used to be 300 but from 2017 the annual intake for each university has been decreased to only 100. The country with a population of over 50 million had only about 1,500 dentists in 2005.

== History ==
The dental school's origins trace back to the Faculty of Medicine of Rangoon University. In 1964, the College of Dental Medicine became independent per the University Act of 1964, and was located near the Lanmadaw campus of then Institute of Medicine 1. The college turned out 50 to 60 dental doctors with Bachelor of Dental Surgery (BDS) degrees. In 1974, the college was upgraded into the Institute of Dental Medicine. Until 1998, when the Institute of Dental Medicine, Mandalay was opened, it was the only institution of dental medicine in the country.

== Programs ==
The university offers bachelor's (BDS), master's (MDSc), and doctorate (DrDSc) programs as well as graduate diplomas in dental science (DipDSc) and dental technology (DDT). The first PhD program of Oral Biological Science was opened in 2011.

== Coursework ==
The B.D.S. coursework extends six years.

Year	Duration
First B.D.S.	1 year
Second B.D.S.	1 year
Third B.D.S.	1 year
Fourth B.D.S.	1 year
Final B.D.S.	1 year
House Surgeon	1 year
Total	6 years

=== Subjects ===
==== First B.D.S. ====
- Myanmar
- English
- Mathematics and Statistics
- Physics
- Chemistry
- Botany
- Zoology

==== Second B.D.S. ====
- Anatomy
- Physiology
- Biochemistry
- Oral Biological Science

==== Third B.D.S. ====
- Pathology
- Microbiology
- Pharmacology
- Conservative Dentistry (Junior Operative Course)
- Prosthodontics (Dental Material Science and Basic Prosthodontics)

==== Fourth B.D.S. part I ====
- General Medicine
- General Surgery
- Clinical Dentistry I (Oral Surgery and Oral Medicine)
- Clinical Dentistry II (Periodontology, PCD, PSM)
- Clinical Dentistry III (Pediatric Dentistry and Orthodontics)
- Conservative Dentistry
- Prosthodontics

==== Final B.D.S. part II ====
- Oral Medicine
- Oral and Maxillofacial Surgery
- Orthodontics
- Paedodontics
- Prosthodontics
- Conservative Dentistry
- Preventive and Community Dentistry
- Periodontology

=== House Surgeon training ===
All students, after a successful completion of Final B.D.S. Examination, continue on to hands-on training for a period of 5 months as house surgeons in the recognized teaching hospitals. Only after the completion of house-surgeonship, is the student awarded the B.D.S. degree.

== Leadership ==
The University of Dental Medicine, Yangon has been headed by an academic dean known as a rector.

1. Aung Than (1964–1983)
2. Khin Maung Lay (1983–1992)
3. Htay Saung (1993–1995)
4. Myint Naing (1995–1997)
5. Paing Soe (1997–2003)
6. Ba Myint (2004–2007)
7. Myo Win (2008–2012)
8. Thein Kyu (2012–2015)
9. Shwe Toe (2015–2025)
10. Kyaw Thiha (2025–present)

== Alumni ==
- Thein Kyu
- Zarganar
