= Myanmar Dental Council =

- မြန်မာနိုင်ငံ သွားနှင့်ခံတွင်း ဆေးကောင်စီ
- Formation: 1970
- Type: Professional association
- Headquarters: Yangon, Myanmar
- Location: Myanmar
- Members: 4,001
- Official language: English and Burmese
- President: Paing Soe
- Staff: 20

The Myanmar Dental Council (Burmese: မြန်မာနိုင်ငံ သွားနှင့်ခံတွင်း ဆေးကောင်စီ; MDC) is a professional association established in 1970 which has more than 4,000 members. The Myanmar Dental Council is formed under the Myanmar Dental Council law (Chapter III) with the approval of the Ministry of Health of Myanmar.

If any registered dental practitioner is desirous of practising dental services, he shall apply to the council to obtain a general dental practitioner's license. Every Myanmar dentists need to submit their license application forms to the Council yearly. The council arranges medical trips to rural areas with active members every year.

== See also ==
- Dentistry
- Myanmar Dental Association
- Myanmar Dental Association (Yangon Region)
- University of Dental Medicine, Mandalay
- University of Dental Medicine, Yangon
