= University of Dental Medicine, Mandalay =

University in Mandalay, Myanmar

- သွားဘက်‌ဆိုင်ရာဆေးတက္ကသိုလ်(မန္တလေး)
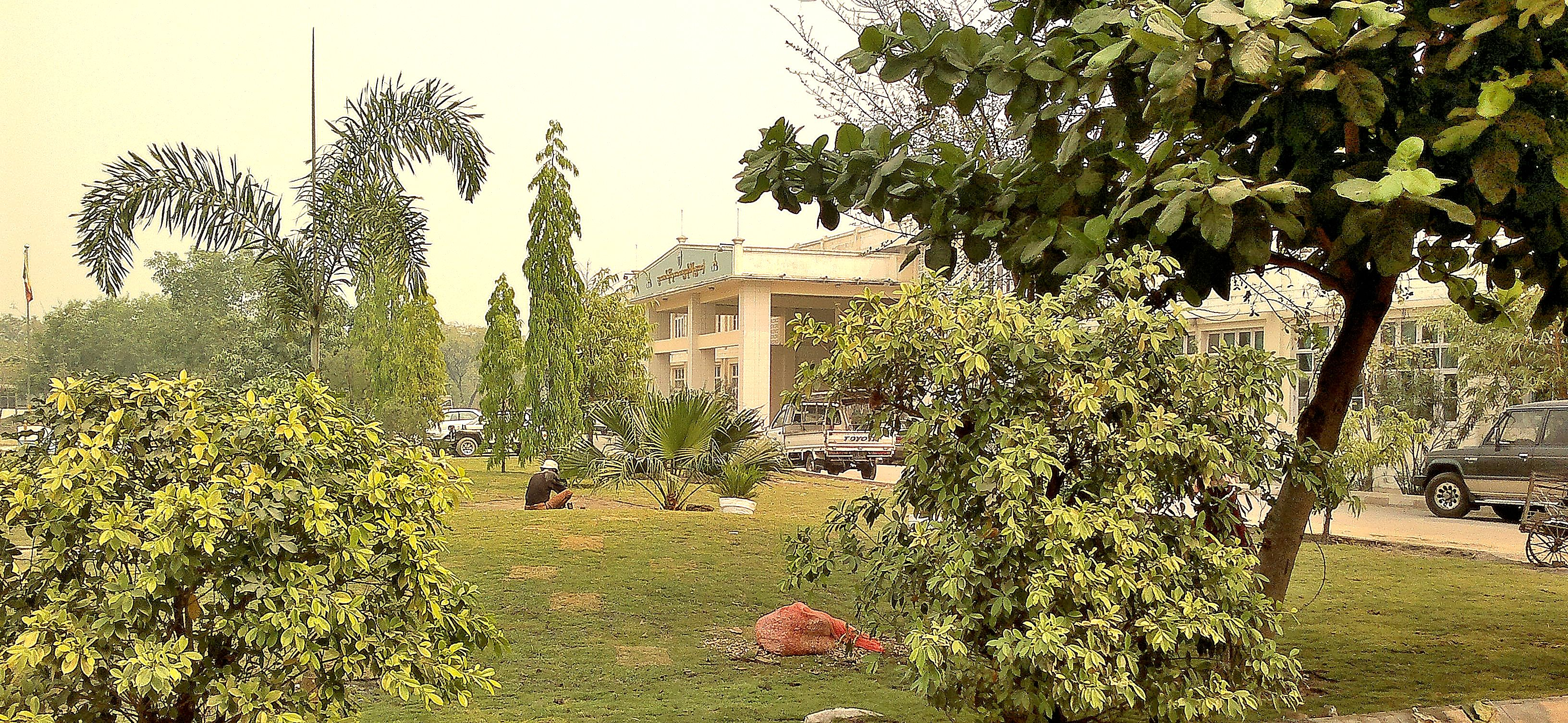
- Motto: အာရောဂျ ပရမာ လာဘာ (Pali: ārogya paramar lābhar)
- Type: Public
- Established: 1998; 28 years ago
- Affiliations: Ministry of Health
- Rector: Kyaw Thiha
- Administrative staff: 196/263
- Students: 900 (2019-2020)
- Undergraduates: 850
- Postgraduates: 50
- Location: 62nd Street, Chanmyathazi, Mandalay, Myanmar; 21°56′41″N 96°06′46″E
- Website: udmm.webs.com

The University of Dental Medicine, Mandalay (Burmese: သွားဘက်‌ဆိုင်ရာဆေးတက္ကသိုလ်(မန္တလေး) [θwábɛʔ sʰàɪɰ̃jà sʰé tɛʔkəθò (máɰ̃dəlé)]), is a university of dental medicine, located in Mandalay, Myanmar. The university offers a six-year bachelor's degree program in dental surgery. Graduate and doctoral studies are now available at the University of Dental Medicine, Mandalay. The university, along with the University of Dental Medicine, Yangon, is one of only two universities of dental medicine in the country. The annual intake into both dental universities is 300.

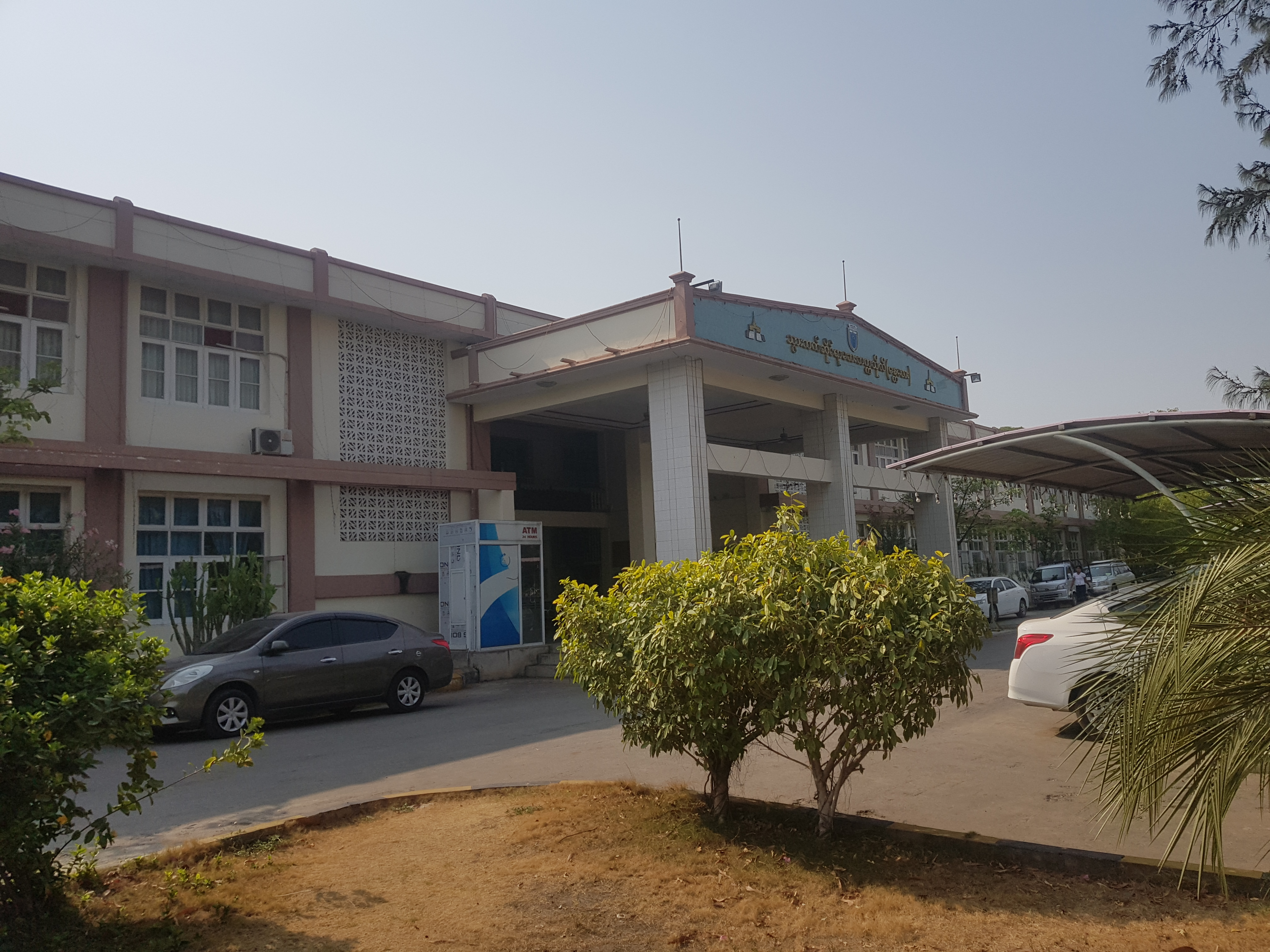
Main Building

== Programs ==
The university offers BDS degree for undergraduate students. Master's degree for eight specialties in dentistry such as MDSc (oral and maxillofacial surgery), MDSc (oral medicine and oral pathology), MDSc(prosthodontics), MDSc (conservative dentistry), MDSc (orthodontics), MDSc (Paediatric dentistry), MDSc (periodontics), MDSc (preventive and community dentistry), Dr.Dent.Sc (Doctor of Dental Science) and graduate diplomas in dental science (DipDSc).

== Coursework ==
The B.D.S. coursework extends over six years.

Year	Duration
First B.D.S.	1 year
Second B.D.S.	1 year
Third B.D.S.	1 year
Fourth B.D.S.	1 year
Final B.D.S.	1 year
House Surgeon	1 year
Total	6 years

=== Subjects ===
First B.D.S.

- Myanmar
- English
- Mathematics and Statistics
- Physics
- Chemistry
- Biology, (Botany and Zoology)
- Basic computer science
- Behavioral Sciences
- Introduction to Human Anatomy
- Introduction to Physiology
- Introduction to Biochemistry
- Introduction to Oral Biological Science

Second B.D.S.

- Anatomy
- Physiology
- Biochemistry
- Oral Biological Science

Third B.D.S.

- General pathology
- Microbiology
- Pharmacology
- Prosthodontics
- Conservative Dentistry

Fourth B.D.S.

- Preventive and Social Medicine, Preventive and Community Dentistry, Periodontology
- General Medicine
- General Surgery
- Oral Medicine and Oral and Maxillofacial Surgery
- Orthodontics
- Paediatric Dentistry

Final B.D.S.

- Oral Medicine
- Oral and Maxillofacial Surgery
- Orthodontics
- Paediatric Dentistry
- Prosthodontics
- Conservative Dentistry
- Preventive and Community Dentistry, Periodontology

=== House Surgeon Training ===
All students, after a successful completion of Final B.D.S. Examination, continue on to hands-on training for a period of 1 year as house surgeons in the recognized teaching hospitals. Only after the completion of house-surgeonship, is the student awarded the B.D.S. degree.

== Post-graduate courses ==
I. Doctorate Courses
1. Doctorate degree in Oral Medicine, Oral Biological Science, Prosthodontics, Conservative Dentistry, Paediatric Dentistry, Orthodontics, Periodontology
II. Master Courses in Oral and Maxillofacial Surgery, Oral Biological Science, Prosthodontics, Conservative Dentistry, Paediatric Dentistry, Orthodontics, Periodontology, Preventive and Community Dentistry
III. Diploma Courses
1. Diploma of Dental Science (General Practice)
2. Diploma of Dental Science (Dental Implantology)
IV. Certificate Courses
1. Certificate in Dental Nursing
2. Dental Implant Training Hands-on

== Official Publication ==
Journal of Clinical Dentistry and Related Research "http://jcdrr-udmm.com/jcdrr">

== Leadership ==
The University of Dental Medicine, Mandalay has been headed by an academic dean known as a rector.
1. 1998–2009: Mya Thaw
2. 2009–2012: Thein Kyu
3. 2012–2015: Shwe Toe
4. 2015–2019: Sun Sun Win
5. 2020–2022: Ko Ko
6.2022-present:Kyaw Thiha

== Overseas Partner Institutions ==
- Kyushu Dental University, Japan
- Hiroshima University, Japan
- Kagoshima University, Japan
- Chosun University, Korea

== Gallery ==
Thein Kyu, the second rector of the university
