= Nuclear power in Poland =

Nuclear power plants in Poland (view)
Unfinished
Planned
Research reactors

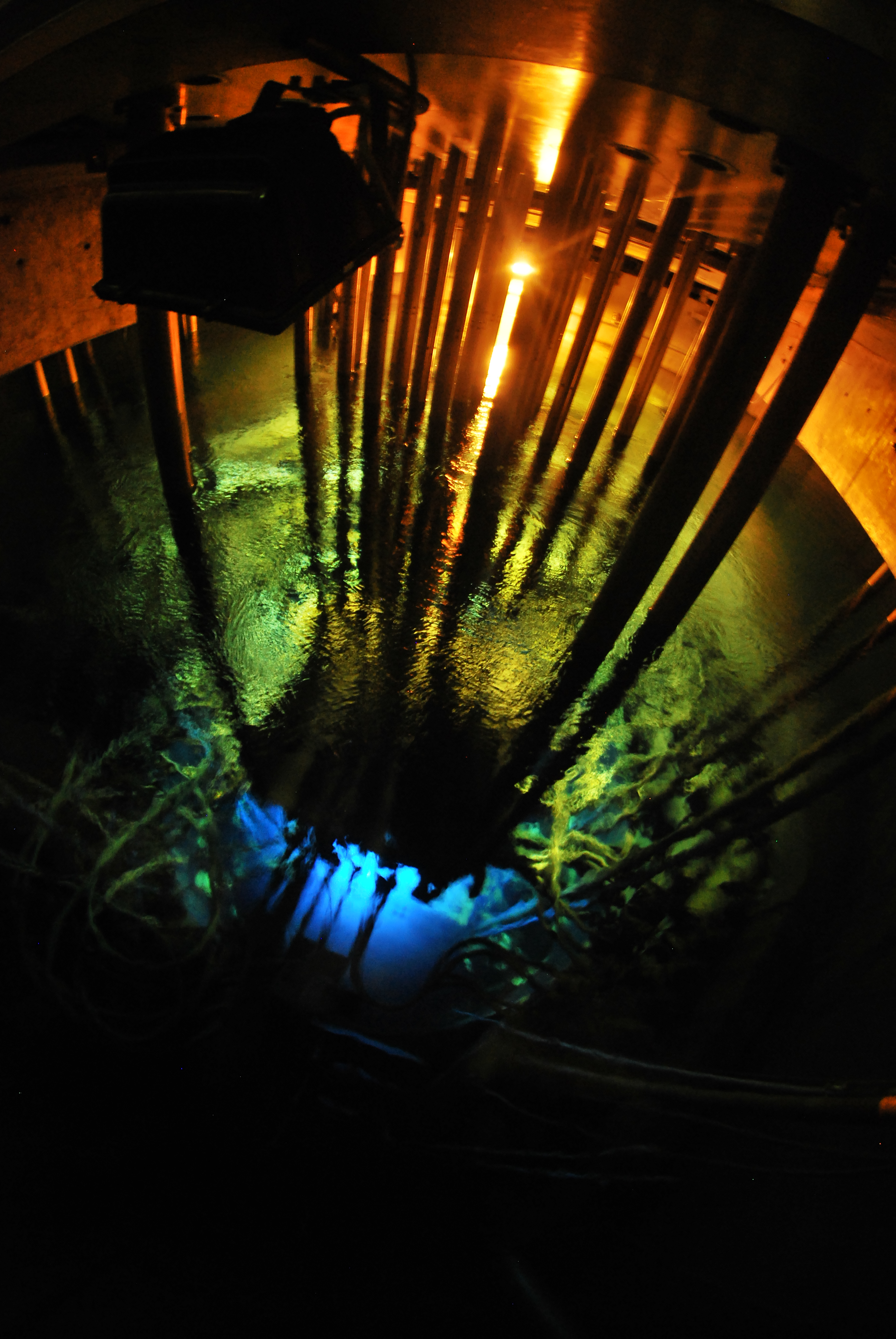
Inside of the Maria reactor core, located in Świerk-Otwock near Warsaw

Poland currently operates a single research reactor, Maria. It has no operational nuclear reactors for power production, but is to start construction of a plant with three Westinghouse AP1000 reactors in 2026 that was originally planned to be completed in 2033-2036 but is currently expected to only be finished by 2040. It also intends to build small modular reactors.

Poland operates a nuclear waste disposal site in Różan, named Krajowe Składowisko Odpadów Promieniotwórczych (National Nuclear Waste Disposal Site) since 1961, where waste from the current and past reactors is stored, without any incidents throughout its operational history.

== Background ==
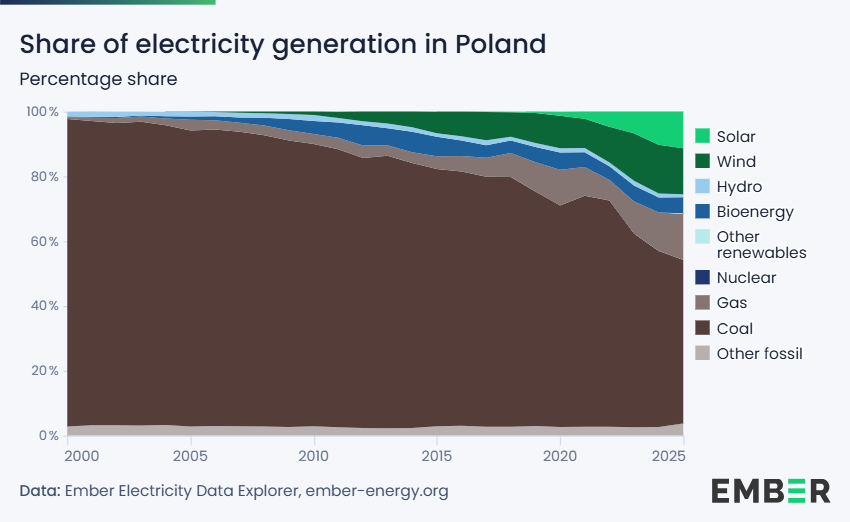
Electricity generation in Poland by source - percentage share

Around 52% of Poland's electricity in 2025 was produced by burning hard coal and lignite (of which Poland has the EU's largest reserves). This took place at industrial facilities and large central generating stations such as the 5 GW Bełchatów Power Station. With the need to reduce carbon dioxide emissions for environmental, climate, and economic reasons, the country continues to explore deployment of nuclear reactors for electricity generation and industrial process heat.

== National nuclear regulator ==
Nuclear activities in Poland are regulated by the national nuclear regulator Państwowa Agencja Atomistyki (PAA). The PAA is a modern nuclear regulator which is an active member of European and international nuclear regulatory organizations.

The principal statute is the Atomic Law of 29 November 2000. The President of the PAA licenses, among other activities, the construction, commissioning, operation and decommissioning of nuclear facilities and the handling of nuclear and radioactive materials, and supervises nuclear safety and radiological protection; inspections may extend to the manufacturing facilities of suppliers. Liability for nuclear damage is concentrated on the operator of the nuclear installation, which must hold nuclear liability insurance, while suppliers and contractors remain liable under ordinary contract law. Polish law does not provide a simplified licensing regime for small modular reactors.

== International relations ==
Poland is a signatory to all major international treaties regarding nuclear energy, a member state of the European Atomic Energy Community, and one of the founding member states of the International Atomic Energy Agency in 1957.

== History ==
=== 1980 through 2000 ===
In the 1980s, the Żarnowiec Nuclear Power Plant was under construction, but the project was abandoned for a mix of reasons, including questions about the profitability of the enterprise, financing issues, and opposition from environmental activists. In 1990, the Polish government formally ended the project and began to liquidate the construction site.

=== 2000 through 2020 ===
A 2006 feasibility study suggested it would be optimal to build an 11.5 GWe capacity nuclear power plant. However, this proving unaffordable in the immediate future, Poland decided to build a 4.5 GWe nuclear power plant by 2030. In 2007, a draft energy policy proposed a 10 GWe nuclear capacity by 2030 to provide 10% of electricity. The deadline gives an estimated ten years for investment and construction and five years of public campaigning.

In July 2006, Poland joined Lithuania, Estonia, and Latvia to build a new nuclear power plant in Lithuania to replace the Ignalina Nuclear Power Plant being shut down due to pressure from the EU. Poland would invest 22% with these other countries into the project, the Visaginas NPP main site would have been under principal construction by early 2016 with necessary prerequisite planning, financing, regulatory agency approval and logistical ground work in terms of infrastructure modernization and expansion finished and in place by 2015. The plant commercial operations scheduled to begin by 31 December 2022. The total costs of the project was to be EUR 6 billion. Poland was guaranteed to have 1,200 MWe from the power plant and has upgraded transmission capacity between Lithuania and Poland. After the nuclear project was abandoned, Lithuania instead became an importer of electricity from Poland.

In a public opinion poll, 60% of the population supported construction of a nuclear power plant in Poland to reduce its dependence on foreign sources of energy. Additionally, 48% supported construction of a nuclear power plant in their neighborhood, citing local benefits that include lower energy costs.

The popular Baltic Sea resort Mielno was one of three sites selected, however in February 2012, residents voted overwhelmingly against the plan. Some 94 percent of the 2,389 people who took part in a referendum opposed the plant and only 5 percent supported it.

In 2014, under the government of Prime Minister Donald Tusk, Poland's Nuclear Power Program was adopted. Through the early 2020s the Polish Nuclear Power Program was managed by the group EJ1 of the state-owned utility PGE Polska Grupa Energetyczna.

=== 2020 to current ===
Growing environmental, climate change, and economic concerns among the Polish public, policymakers, and businesses continues to drive Polish interest in nuclear power in the 2020s. The most significant efforts are those of the state-owned nuclear development company Polskie Elektrownie Jądrowe regarding large light water reactors in the 1,000 MWe to 1,250 MWe range and those of private industrial companies pursuing small modular reactors for deployment at industrial sites.

In 2021 Polish Prime Minister Mateusz Morawiecki, jointly with prime ministers of Hungary, France, Czech Republic, Romania, Slovak Republic and Slovenia, signed an open letter to European Commission calling for recognition of role of nuclear power as the only non-intermittent low-carbon energy source currently available at industrial scale in Europe.

In April 2021 the Polish Academy of Sciences (PAN) published a comprehensive report on perspectives on the decarbonization of the energy sector, calling for increased use of "any low-carbon energy sources", including renewable energy and nuclear power. Minister of energy Michał Kurtyka declared it's not realistic to look at low-carbon energy sector without nuclear power.

A November 2021 poll indicated 74% of respondents were in favor of building nuclear power plants in Poland in general, 58% supported their location in their neighborhood and 39% opposed the latter. 82% believed nuclear power plants contribute to the energy resilience of the country.

A proposal has been also raised to retrofit thermal plants in Poland by replacing their coal boilers with SMRs, while preserving their existing generation and distribution infrastructure, which would reduce upfront capital costs by 28-35% and reduce CO_{2} emissions.

In September 2023, Polskie Elektrownie Jądrowe formally signed an outline agreement with Westinghouse and Bechtel for the construction of Poland's first commercial nuclear power plant. The total investment into the plant, which will produce up to 3750 MWe and is estimated to be completed by 2032 or 2033, will amount to around 100 billion PLN. In 2024, Jan Chadam (acting head of Polskie Elektrownie Jadrowe,) said the actual costs would be around 150 billion PLN (EUR 34.64 bln), so more than 10 bln EUR per GW.

In May 2024, the Polish industry minister Marzena Czarnecka said that Poland's first nuclear plant is realistically seen starting operations in 2040, much later than the previously-envisaged 2032.

In June 2024, following the election of a new government led by Donald Tusk, Polska Grupa Energetyczna stated it will decide whether to make the investment in nuclear within the next few years.

In December 2025 the European Commission approved Polish state aid for the first plant, including PLN 60.2 billion of public support in 2025-2030. On 31 March 2026 PEJ applied to the President of the National Atomic Energy Agency for a construction licence; the application, with attachments, runs to over 40,000 pages, and the regulator has 24 months to decide, excluding time given to supplement the documentation. PEJ expects to pour first nuclear concrete in the fourth quarter of 2028 and the three AP1000 units to enter commercial operation in 2036, 2037 and 2038. An update of the Polish Nuclear Power Programme adopted by the government in September 2026 confirmed the 2036 date and provides for a second plant, with construction from 2032 and a first unit around 2040; Bełchatów and Konin are the preferred sites, and a technology partner is to be selected in 2027.

== List of nuclear power plants ==
Plant name	Unit No.	Type	Model	Status	Capacity (MW)	Begin building	Commercial operation	Closed
Żarnowiec	1	PWR	VVER-440	Unfinished	440	31 Mar 1982		4 Sep 1990
Żarnowiec	2	PWR	VVER-440	Unfinished	440	31 Mar 1982		4 Sep 1990
Żarnowiec	3	PWR	VVER-440	Cancelled	440			
Żarnowiec	4	PWR	VVER-440	Cancelled	440			
Warta (Klempicz)	1	PWR	VVER-1000	Unfinished	1000	1987		22 Apr 1989
Warta (Klempicz)	2	PWR	VVER-1000	Cancelled	1000			
Warta (Klempicz)	3	PWR	VVER-1000	Cancelled	1000			
Warta (Klempicz)	4	PWR	VVER-1000	Cancelled	1000			
Lubiatowo-Kopalino Nuclear Power Plant	1	PWR	AP1000	Planned	1250	(2026)	(2033)	
Lubiatowo-Kopalino Nuclear Power Plant	2	PWR	AP1000	Planned	1250		(2035–2036)	
Lubiatowo-Kopalino Nuclear Power Plant	3	PWR	AP1000	Planned	1250		(2037–2039)	
Pątnów	1	PWR	APR-1400	Planned	1340			
Pątnów	2	PWR	APR-1400	Planned	1340			
Włocławek	1	BWR	BWRX-300	Planned	300		(2030)	
Ostrołęka	1	BWR	BWRX-300	Planned	300		(2030)	
Warsaw	1	BWR	BWRX-300	Planned	300		(2030)	
Tarnobrzeg/Stalowa Wola	1	BWR	BWRX-300	Planned	300		(2030)	
Dąbrowa Górnicza	1	BWR	BWRX-300	Planned	300		(2030)	
Stawy Monowskie	1	BWR	BWRX-300	Planned	300		(2030)	
Kraków	1	BWR	BWRX-300	Planned	300		(2030)	

== 2020s PEJ large light water reactors proposals ==
In the late 2010s and early 2020s, a special purpose entity of Poland's largest energy group PGE Polska Grupa Energetyczna known as EJ1 led the siting and development efforts for large light water reactors in Poland. In 2021, the functions of PGE EJ1 were transferred to a new state-owned entity, Polskie Elektrownie Jądrowe (PEJ), which was charged with developing 6 to 9 GWe of proven, large-scale, Generation III(+) pressurized water reactors such as the AP1000, APR-1400, and EPR. It is 100% owned by the State Treasury.

PEJ is conducting siting studies and planning for construction and operation of six 1-1.5 GWe reactors starting from 2026 with the planned completion of first reactor by 2033 and all of them connected to the grid by 2040 with total nameplate capacity of 6-9 GWe. The siting investigation conducted by PGE and PEJ included screening 92 potential locations before detailed studies were conducted two final candidate sites. Two sites in Pomorskie – Żarnowiec and Lubiatowo-Kopalino – were subject to more detailed scrutiny and the results published in the Environmental Impact Assessment (EIA) Report submitted to the General Director for Environmental Protection on March 29, 2022. The EIA considered multiple reactors generating up to 3,750 MWe at the site.

On December 22, 2021, PEJ announced the preferred location for Poland's first commercial nuclear power plant as the Baltic Sea coastal commune of Choczewo in Wejherowo County, Pomeranian Voivodeship at a site called Lubiatowo-Kopalino.

In October 2022, Poland announced that it had selected Westinghouse to build the first three-unit plant, with construction to start in 2026 and commissioning of the first reactor scheduled for 2033. A formal decision on a second three units is to be taken at a later date.

In May 2024, the Polish industry minister Marzena Czarnecka said that Poland's first nuclear plan is realistically seen starting operations in 2040, much later than the previously-envisaged 2032.

== 2020s commercial large pressurized water reactors proposals ==
In October 2022, Polish utilities PGE and ZE PAK announced an agreement with Korea Hydro & Nuclear Power to explore building a number of APR-1400 reactors near ZE PAK's coal-fired plant at Pątnów. This development effort is led by private industry and is separate from (and in addition to) the government-led effort with PEJ.

== 2020s industrial small modular reactors proposals ==
Private chemical industry producer Synthos (owned by Michał Sołowow) plans to deploy a GE Vernova Hitachi BWRX-300 SMR in its plant in Oświęcim. In August 2021 Synthos was joined by ZE PAK coal power station (owned by Zygmunt Solorz), with both planning construction of six 300 MW reactors.

In 2022 KGHM, one of Poland's largest consumers of electricity, declared that shifting from coal to nuclear power is the only way for European industries to grow and remain competitive. KGHM signed a contract to initiate work towards deploying VOYGR SMR units with NuScale.

In 2023 KGHM and joint venture Orlen Synthos Green Energy were granted government permission under General Opinions for their chosen reactor technologies.

== See also ==
- List of commercial nuclear reactors#Poland
- List of nuclear research reactors#Poland
- Energy in Poland
