= Choczewo =

Village in Kashubia

Choczewo Chòczewò
- Village
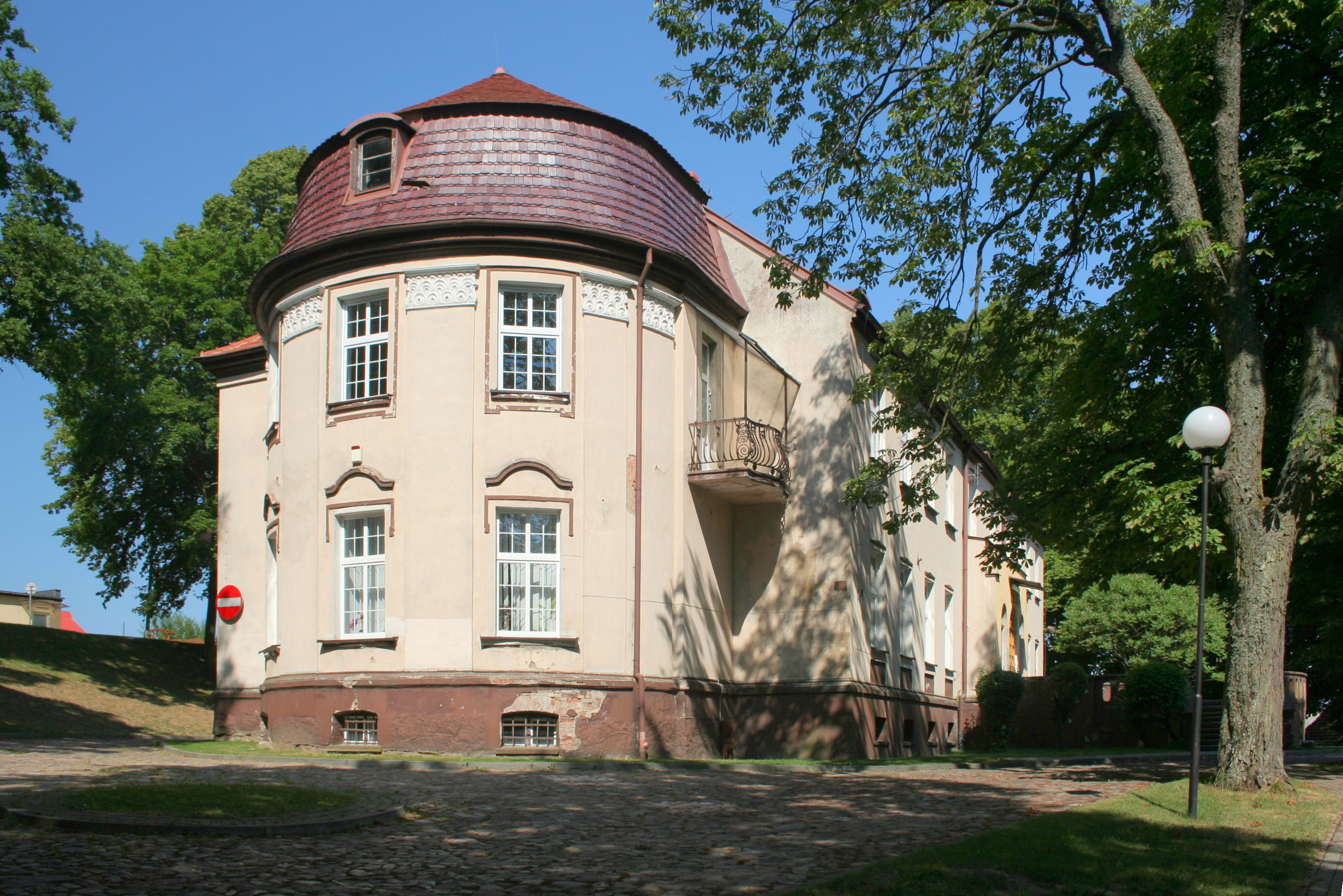
- Cultural center and library

- Location within Poland
- Coordinates: 54°44′27″N 17°53′31″E
- Country: Poland
- Voivodeship: Pomeranian
- County: Wejherowo
- Gmina: Choczewo

Population
  - Total: 1,310
- Time zone: UTC+1 (CET)
  - Summer (DST): UTC+2 (CEST)
- Postal code: 84-210
- Vehicle registration: GWE

Choczewo ([xɔˈt͡ʂɛvɔ]; Kashubian: Chòczewò) is a village in Wejherowo County, Pomeranian Voivodeship, in northern Poland. It is the seat of the gmina (administrative district) called Gmina Choczewo. It is located in the historic region of Pomerania.

Choczewo lies on a disused railway line from Wejherowo to Garczegorze (PKP rail line 230), and had a station on it on the north side of the village.

It is home to an 18th-century manor house of the Dzięcielski family, which now houses a cultural center and library.

In 2011, Choczewo was selected, along with two other sites (Gąski and Żarnowiec), to host the first Polish nuclear power plant, scheduled to be built 9 years later. In 2014, a government study postponed the opening of this first Polish plant to 2024. Then, in early 2015, the Minister of Finance postponed commissioning to 2027.

On 22 December 2021, Polskie Elektrownie Jądrowe announced the preferred location for Poland's first commercial nuclear power plant at a site called Lubiatowo-Kopalino, northwest to the village.

== Images of Choczewo ==
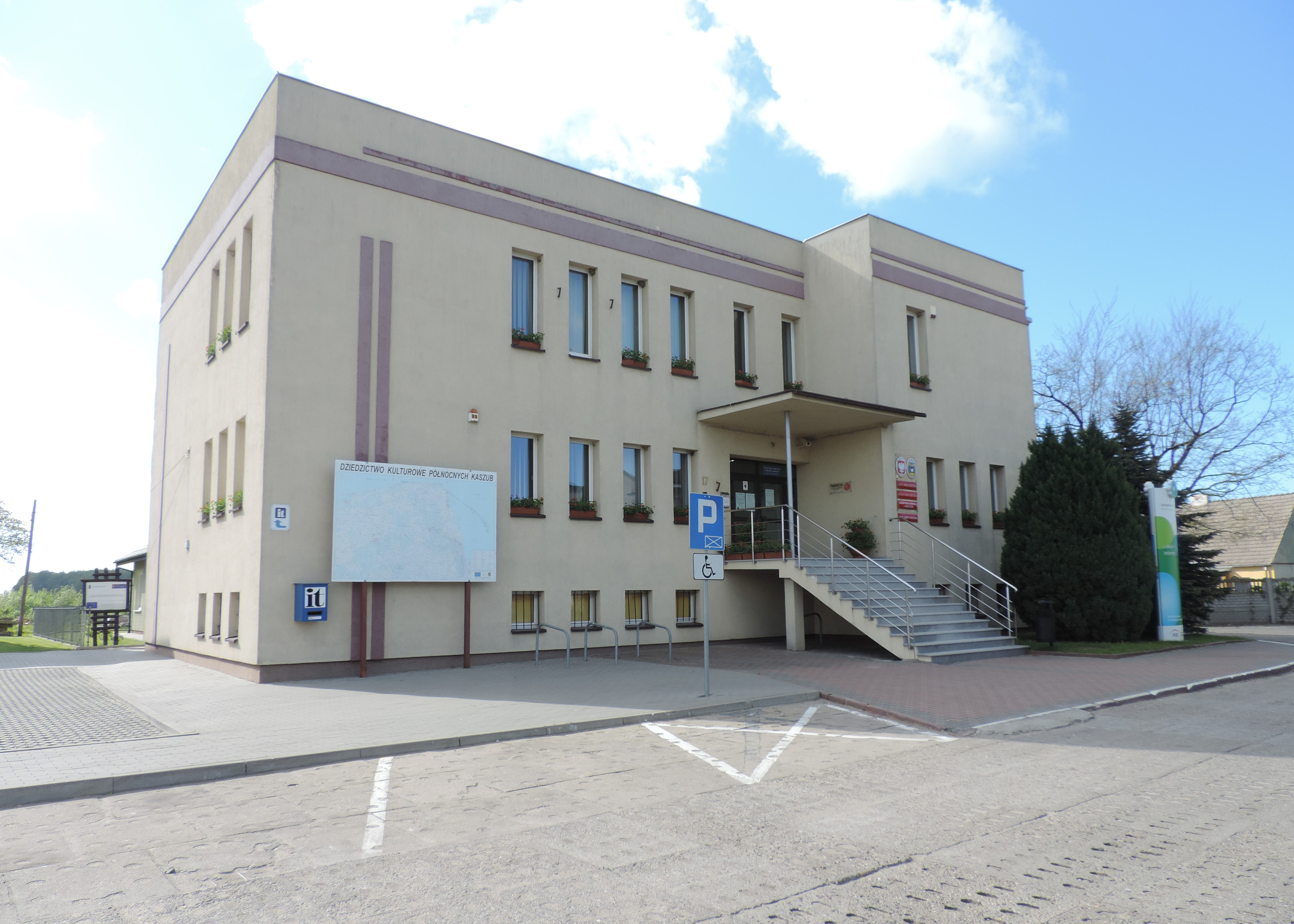
Gmina office

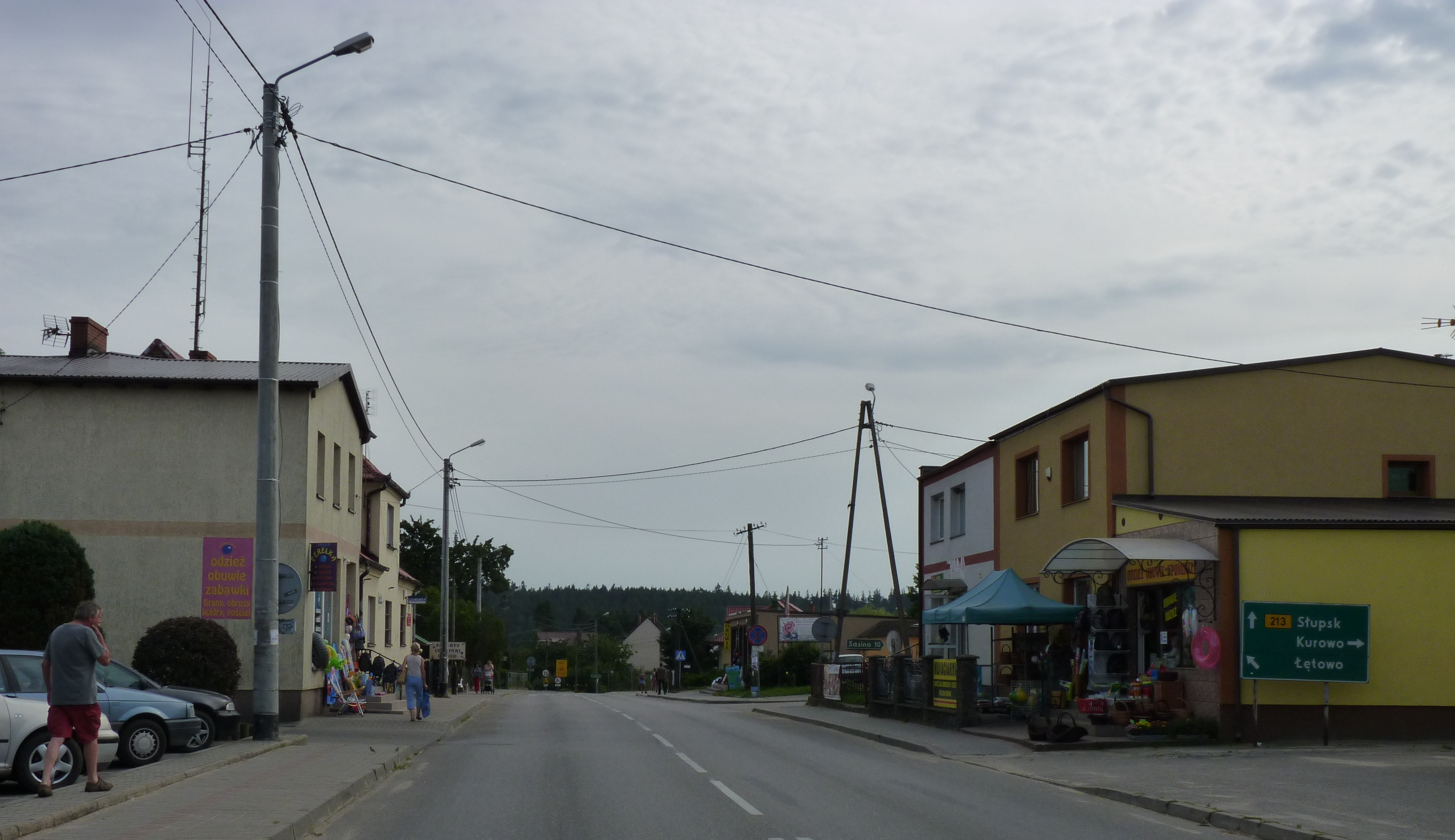
Route 213, the main street of Choczewo

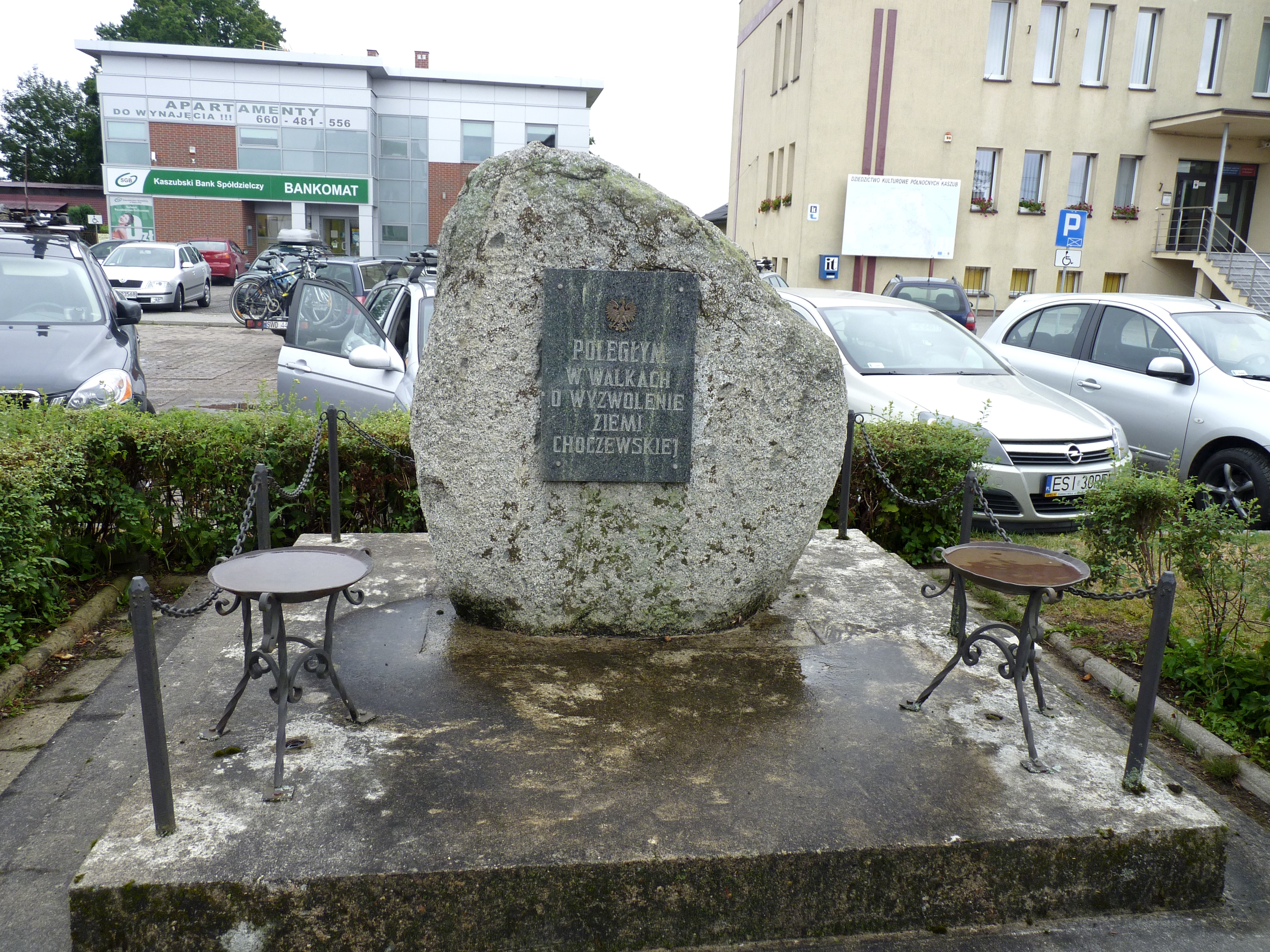
War memorial beside the 213 road in the center of Choczewo. The inscription reads: "To those who fell in the battles for the liberation of the Choczewo region"

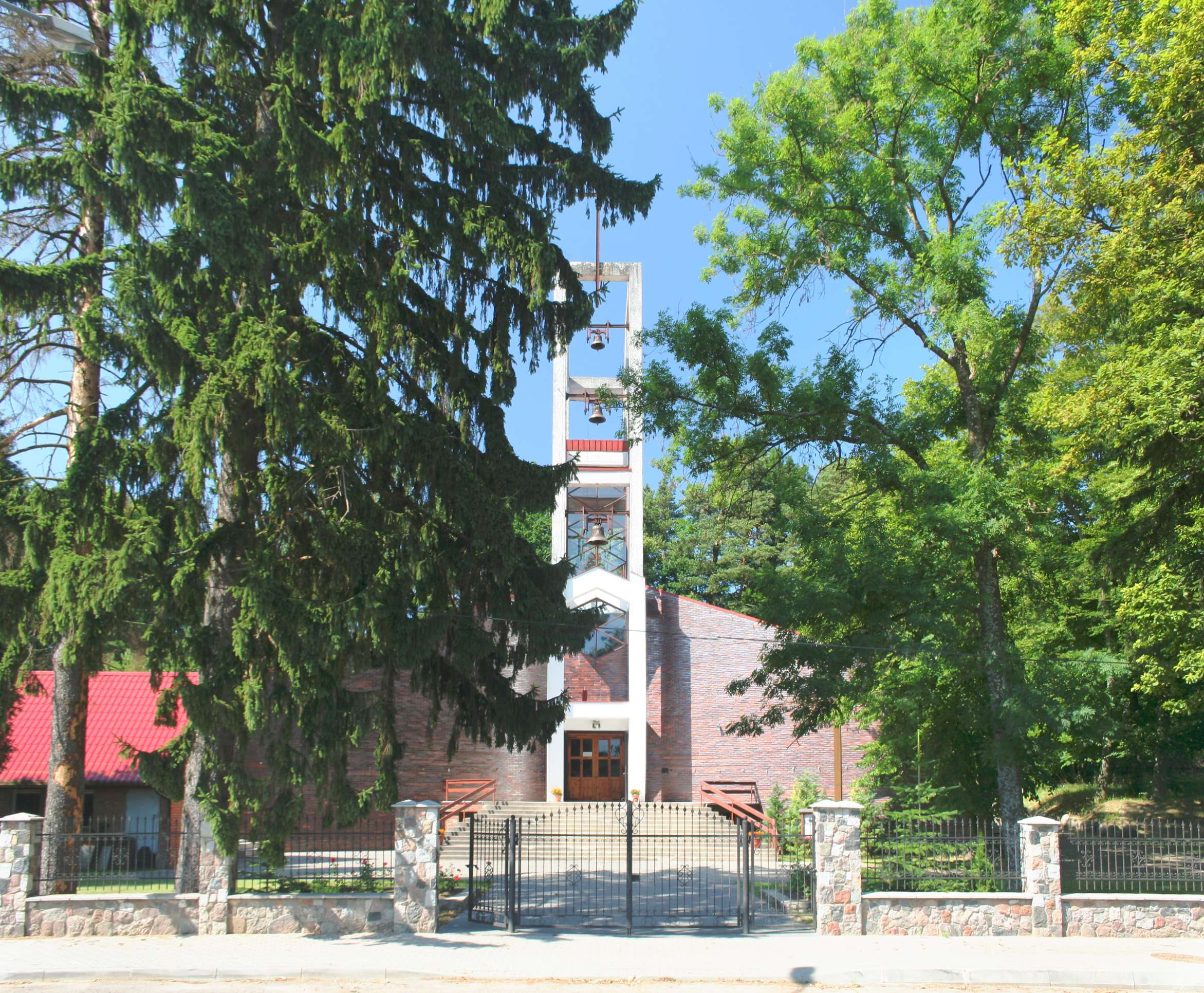
Our Lady Queen of Poland church
