= Polskie Elektrownie Jądrowe =

Developer of nuclear power plants in Poland

Polskie Elektrownie Jądrowe sp. z o.o.
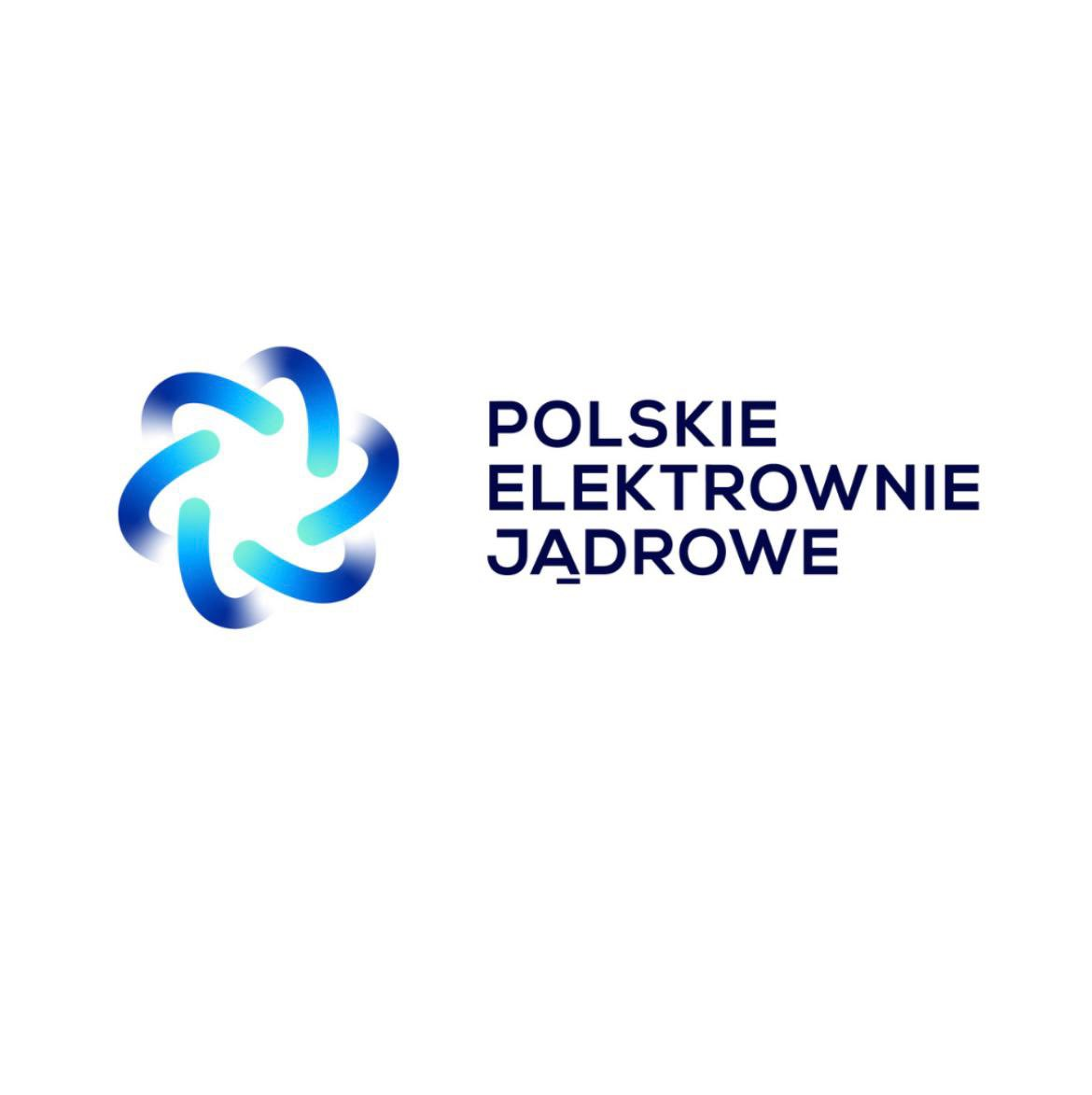
- Headquarters: Warsaw, Poland
- Website: ppej.pl

Polskie Elektrownie Jądrowe sp. z o.o. (abbreviated PEJ) is a developer of nuclear power plants in Poland. It is a special purpose vehicle 100% owned by the State Treasury. The company is specifically charged with developing 6 to 9GWe of proven, large-scale, Generation III(+) pressurized water reactors such as the AP1000, APR-1400, and EPR.

Until March 2021, the functions of PEJ were a part of the PGE Group (Polska Grupa Energetyczna).

== Proposed Nuclear Power Plant at Lubiatowo-Kopalino site ==
On December 22, 2021, PEJ announced the preferred location for Poland's first commercial nuclear power plant as the Baltic Sea coastal commune of Choczewo in Wejherowo County, Pomeranian Voivodeship at a site called Lubiatowo-Kopalino.

The siting investigation conducted by PGE and PEJ included screening 92 potential locations before detailed studies were conducted two final candidate sties. Two sites in Pomorskie – Żarnowiec and Lubiatowo-Kopalino – were subject to more detailed scrutiny and the results published in the Environmental Impact Assessment (EIA) Report submitted to the General Director for Environmental Protection on March 29, 2022. The EIA considered multiple reactors generating up to 3,750MWe at the site. On August 22, 2023, PEJ submitted an application to the Head of Pomorskie Voivodeship for issuing a location decision for Poland's first nuclear power plant, to be built in Pomerania, in Choczewo commune – it is one the key milestones in the administrative process leading to the start of construction of a nuclear facility.

In November 2022, the Polish government selected the Westinghouse AP1000 reactor design for the proposed nuclear power station. In October 2023, the Pomeranian Voivodeship regional authority authorised preparatory work at the site; a construction permit would still be required later.

In September 2023, an engineering development agreement was signed with a Westinghouse–Bechtel consortium intended to build the plant. In July 2024, the Ministry of Climate and Environment agreed in principle to the construction. A letter of intent for the build costing $17.8 billion was agreed, with commercial operation of the first unit scheduled for 2036.

In February 2026, a loan agreement with the Export–Import Bank of the United States (EXIM) was agreed to finance preparatory and engineering work, refinancing work already carried out by the Westinghouse–Bechtel consortium. It was believed this confirms EXIM's willingness to support the subsequent phases of the build alongside Poland's National Development Bank. The Polish government intends to provide about €14 billion ($16.6 billion) of equity covering 30% of PEJ's debt to finance the build. A sixty-year two-way contract for difference will give revenue security for the operational life of the plant.

== Proposed Inland Nuclear Power Plant ==
A second nuclear power plant at an inland location is being explored to follow the proposed first nuclear power plant on the Baltic Sea coast.

== See also ==
- Nuclear power in Poland
