= Choczewo railway station =

Railway station in Poland

Choczewo

General information
- Location: Choczewo; Poland
- Coordinates: 54.744482°N 17.893521°E
- Owner: Polskie Koleje Państwowe S.A.
- Platforms: 2

Construction
- Structure type: Building: Yes (no longer used); Depot: Pulled down Water tower: Yes (no longer used)

History
- Former names: Gotendorf until 1945; Chottschow
Location

Choczewo is a non-operational PKP railway station on the disused PKP rail line 230 in Choczewo (Pomeranian Voivodeship), Poland. It lies on the north side of the village of Choczewo itself.

== Lines crossing the station ==
Start station	End station	Line type
Wejherowo	Garczegorze	Closed
