= Ryszard Kunze =

Polish fencer

Personal information
- Born: 12 December 1939 (age 86) Wejherowo, Reichsgau Danzig-West Prussia

Sport
- Sport: Fencing

Ryszard Kunze (born 12 December 1939) is a Polish fencer. He competed in the team foil event at the 1960 Summer Olympics.
