= Jerzy Budnik =

Polish politician

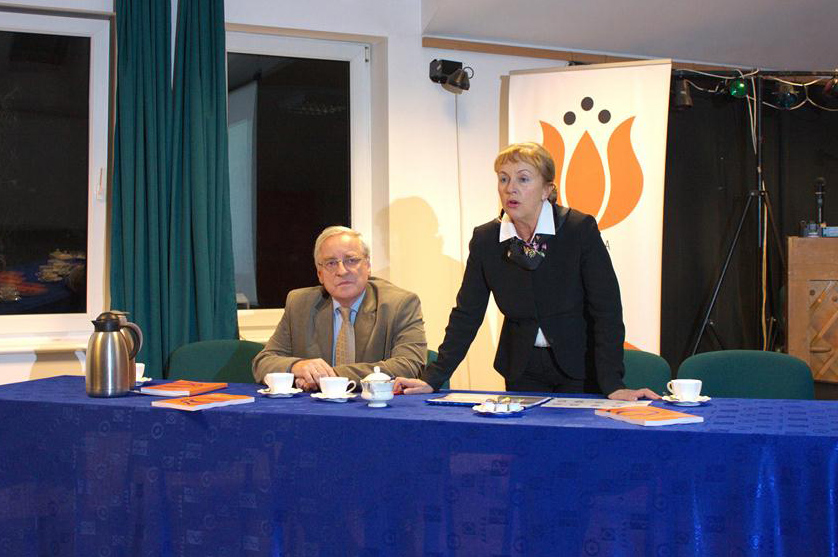
- Budnik seated, at left

Member of Sejm
- In office 20 October 1997 – 11 November 2015

Personal details
- Born: 30 May 1951 (age 74)
- Party: Civic Platform

Jerzy Feliks Budnik (born 30 May 1951 in Wejherowo) is a Polish politician. He was elected to the Sejm on 25 September 2005, getting 8,396 votes in 26 Gdynia district as a candidate from the Civic Platform list.

He was also a member of Sejm 1997-2001 and Sejm 2001-2005.

== See also ==
- Members of Polish Sejm 2005-2007
