= Pątnów Power Station =

Power station in Poland

Coordinates: 52°18′04″N 18°14′10″E

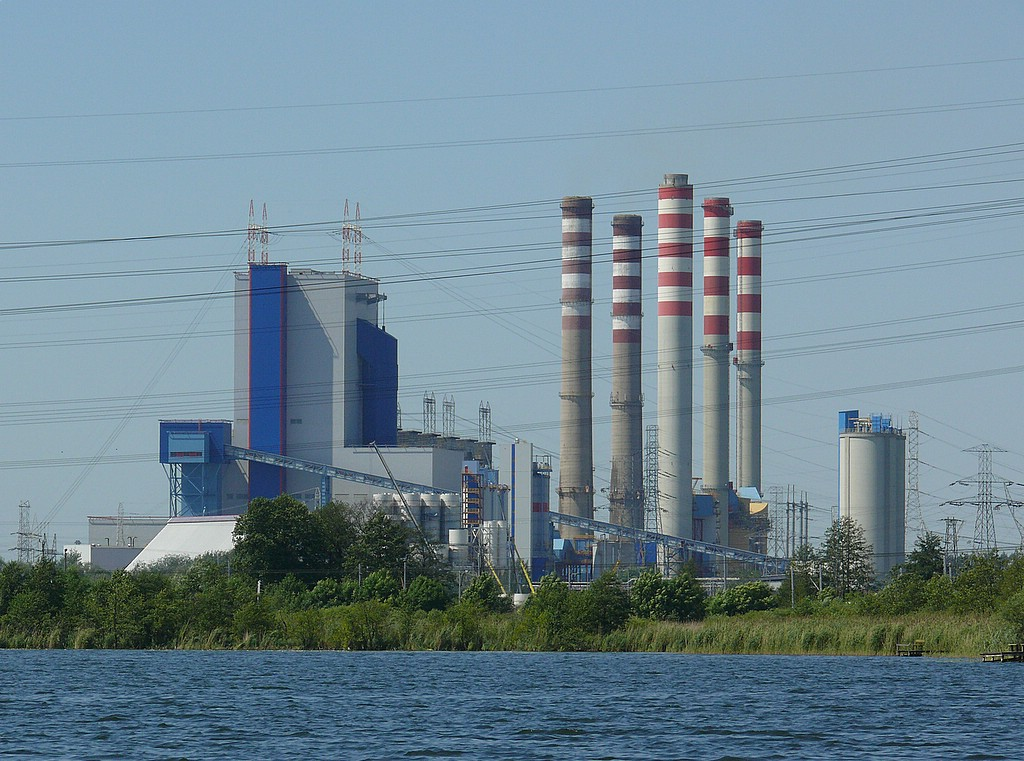
Pątnów Power Station

Pątnów Power Station is a lignite fired power plant in Pątnów, northern suburbs of Konin, Poland with a total generation capacity of 1674 MW. The first unit of Pątnów Power Station went in service in 1967. The newest unit of Pątnów Power Station is Pątnów II with a generation capacity of 474 MW. It has a 143 metres high boiler house, which is the highest boiler house in Poland. Pątnów Power Station has 5 chimneys, each 150 metres tall. A 200 metres tall chimney of Pątnów Power Station was demolished in 2008.

In 2022 Korea Hydro & Nuclear Power agreed to build several nuclear reactors at the Pątnów power plant, but they withdrew from the deal in 2025.

== See also ==
- List of power stations in Poland
