= Wejherowo =

City in Poland

Wejherowo Wejrowò
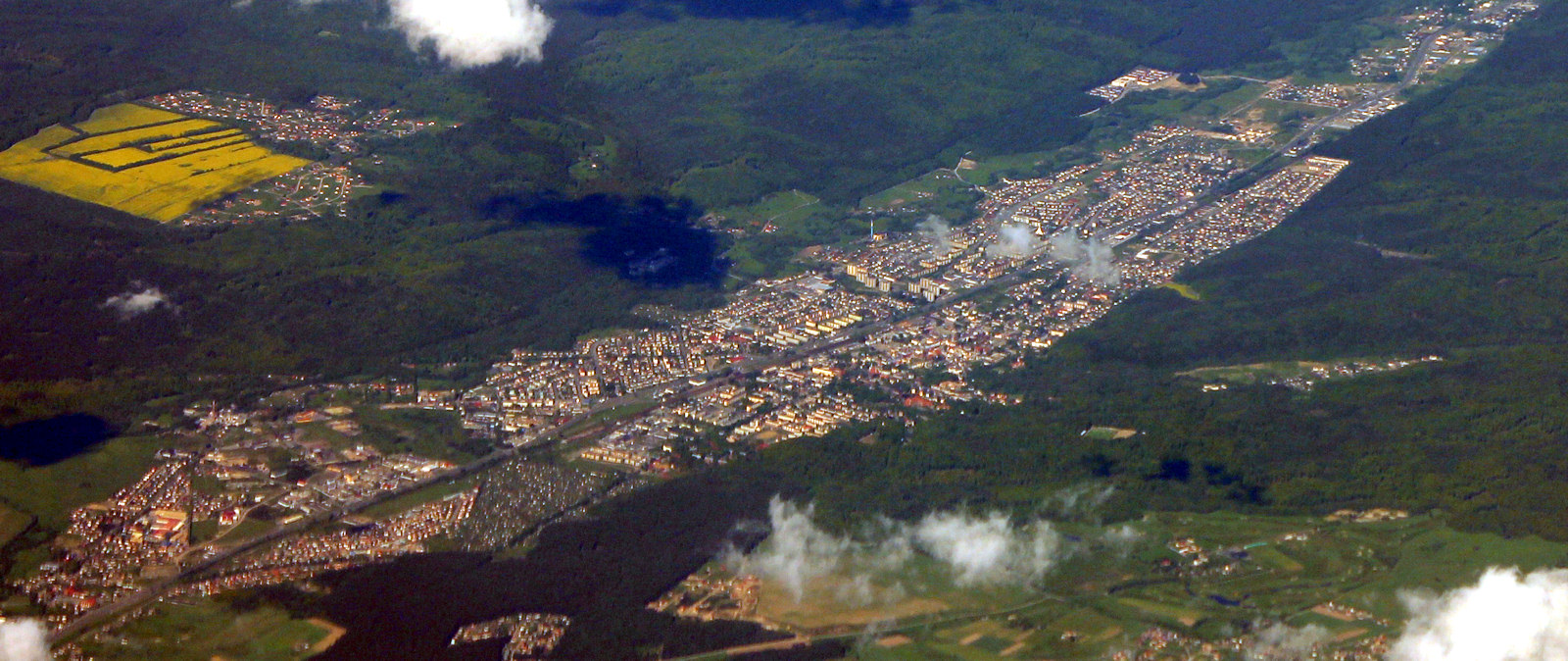
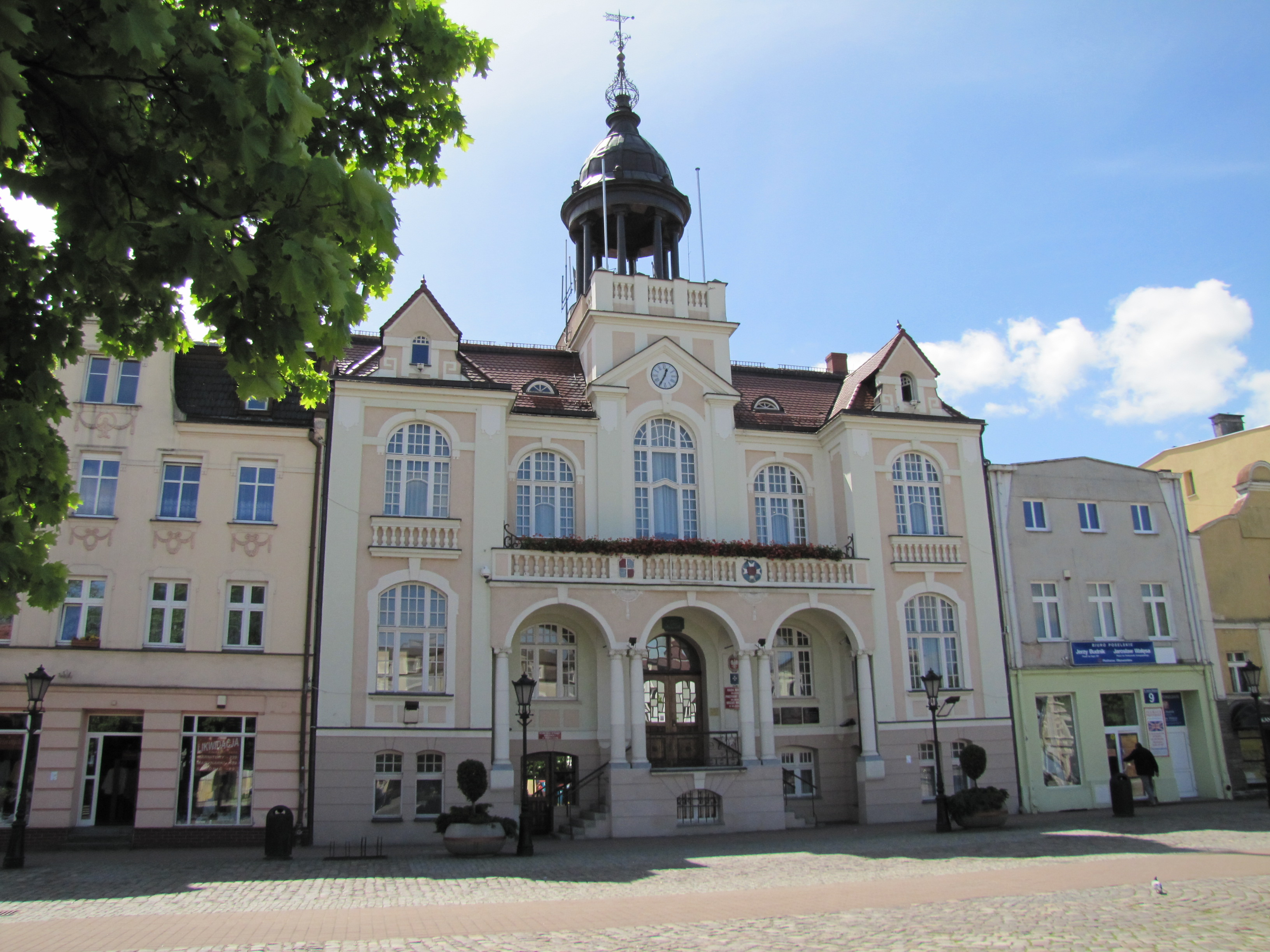
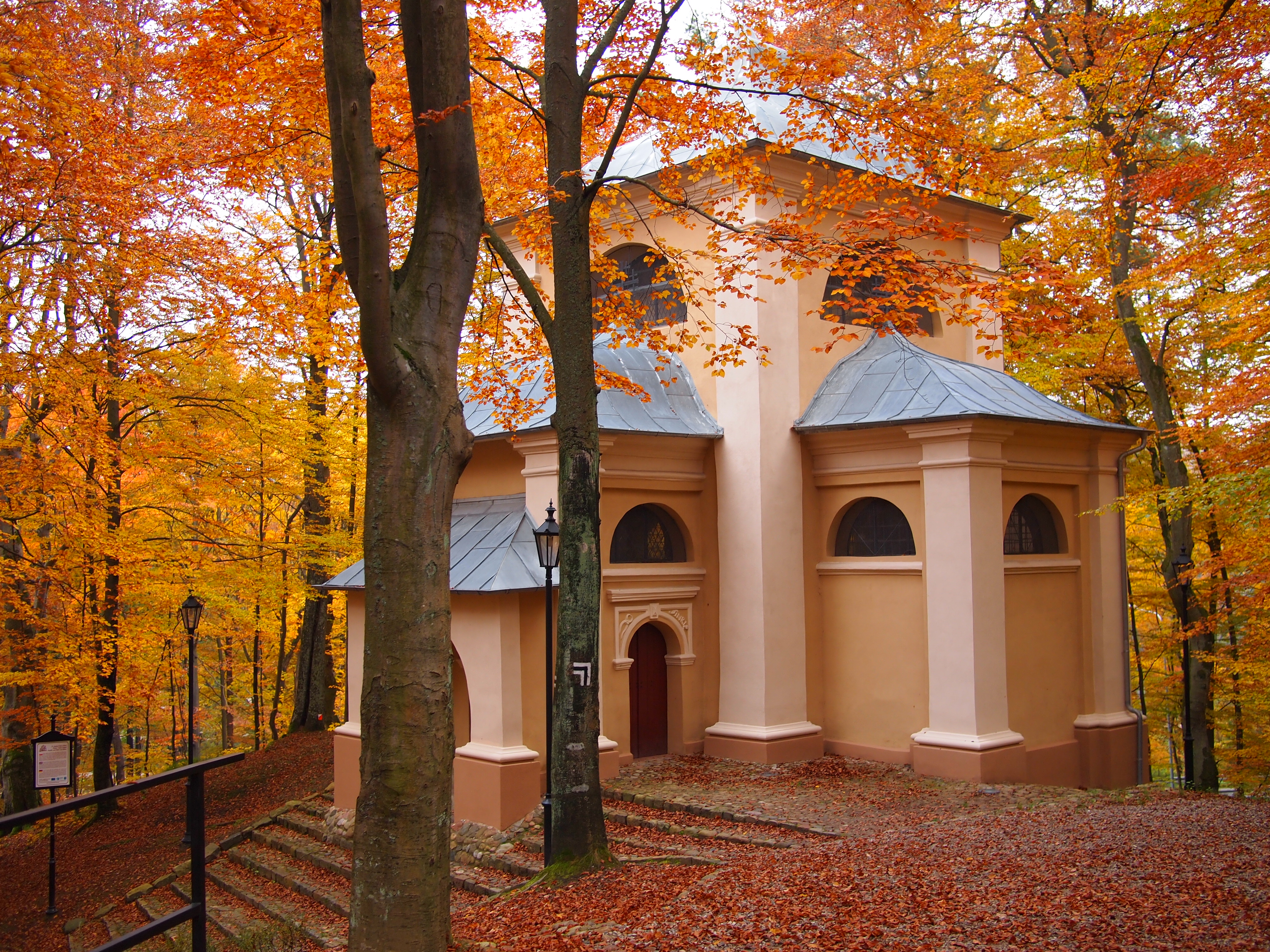
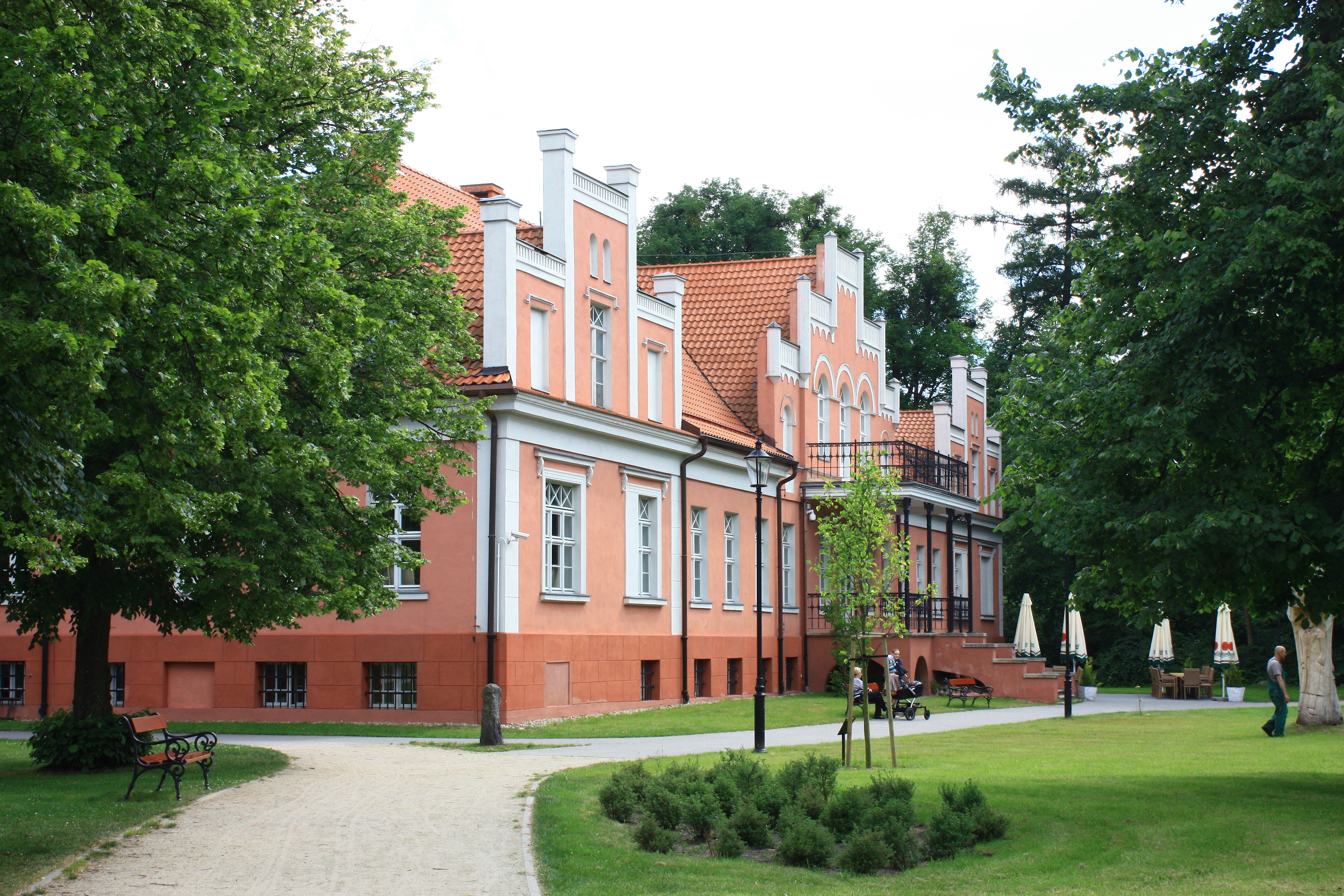
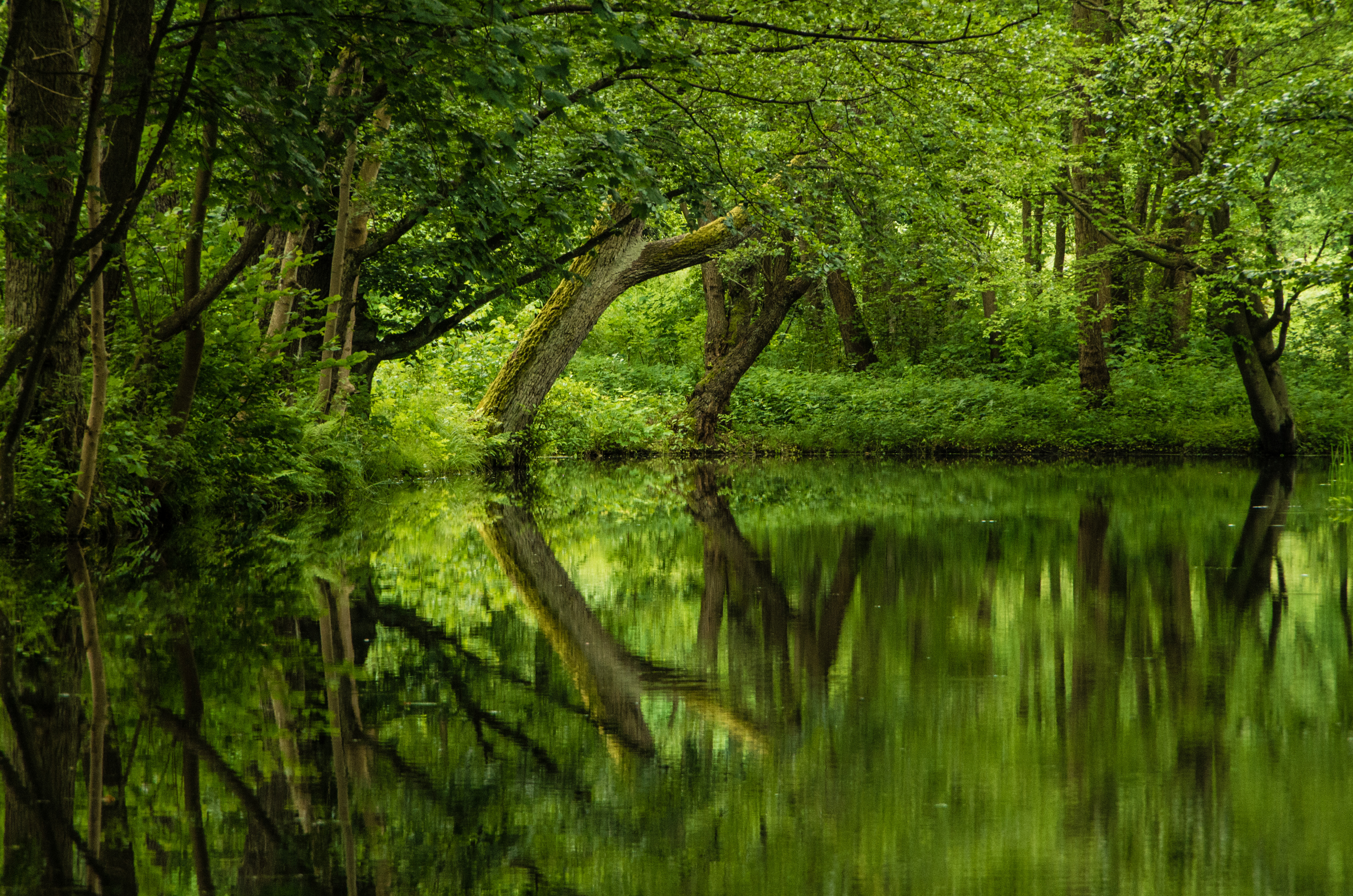
- Wejherowo from a bird's eye view Town Hall Wejherowo Calvary Przebendowski Palace Aleksander Majkowski Park

- Flag Coat of arms

- Location within Poland
- Coordinates: 54°36′N 18°15′E
- Country: Poland
- Voivodeship: Pomeranian
- County: Wejherowo
- Gmina: Wejherowo (urban gmina)
- Established: 1643
- City rights: 1650
- Founder: Jakub Wejher
- Named for: Jakub Wejher

Government
  - City mayor: Krzysztof Hildebrandt

Area
  - City: 26.99 km^{2} (10.42 sq mi)
- Highest elevation: 110 m (360 ft)
- Lowest elevation: 24 m (79 ft)

Population (2020)
  - City: 49,505
  - Density: 1,834/km^{2} (4,751/sq mi)
  - Metro: 130,000
- Time zone: UTC+1 (CET)
  - Summer (DST): UTC+2 (CEST)
- Postal code: 84-200 to 84-204
- Area code: +48 58
- Car plates: GWE
- Website: www.wejherowo.pl

Wejherowo [vɛi̯xɛˈrɔvɔ] (Kashubian: Wejrowò; formerly German: Neustadt in Westpreußen) is a city in Gdańsk Pomerania, northern Poland, with 48,735 inhabitants (2021). It has been the capital of Wejherowo County in Pomeranian Voivodeship since 1999; previously, it was a city in Gdańsk Voivodeship (1975–1998).

== Geographical location ==
Wejherowo is located in Pomeralia, in the ethnocultural region of Kashubia, approximately 11 km (7 mi) west of the town of Rumia, 32 kilometres (20 miles) east of the town of Lębork and 35 km (22 mi) north-west of the regional metropole of Gdańsk, in the broad glacial valley of the river Rheda at an altitude of 30 metres (98 feet) above sea level.

== History ==
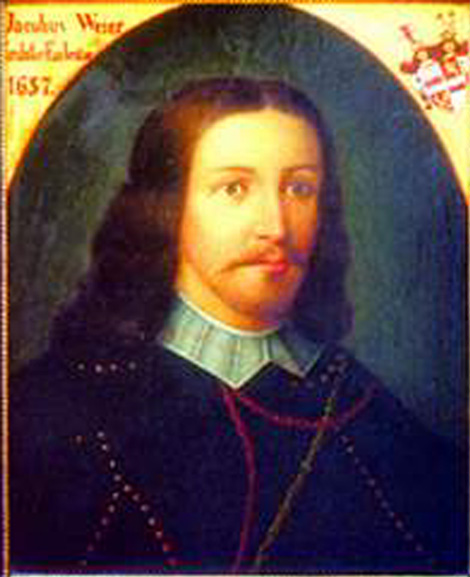
Jakub Wejher, the founder of Wejherowo

Wejherowo was founded in 1643 as Wola Wejherowska (literally "Wejher's Wola"), by the voivode of the Malbork Voivodeship, and Polish noble, Jakub Wejher. It was translated in the colloquial German of the time as Weihersfrey or Veyersfrey. According to the founder's will, the dwellers of the new settlement were to possess the same city rights as other towns in the region, hence the place granted Kulm law. The town's privileges, received in 1655, were confirmed by King John II Casimir Vasa of Poland.

Wejher, who survived the Smolensk War, built two churches in the new settlement (The Holy Trinity and Saint Ann). He also brought in Franciscan fathers, built a monastery, and founded a calvary, consisting of 26 chapels, aligned along the border of the town forest, which were built during 1646–55. According to the founder's written statement of 1655, all honorable persons, independent of their nationality, were invited to become citizens of the new settlement if they would pay a citizen fee of ten gulden each.

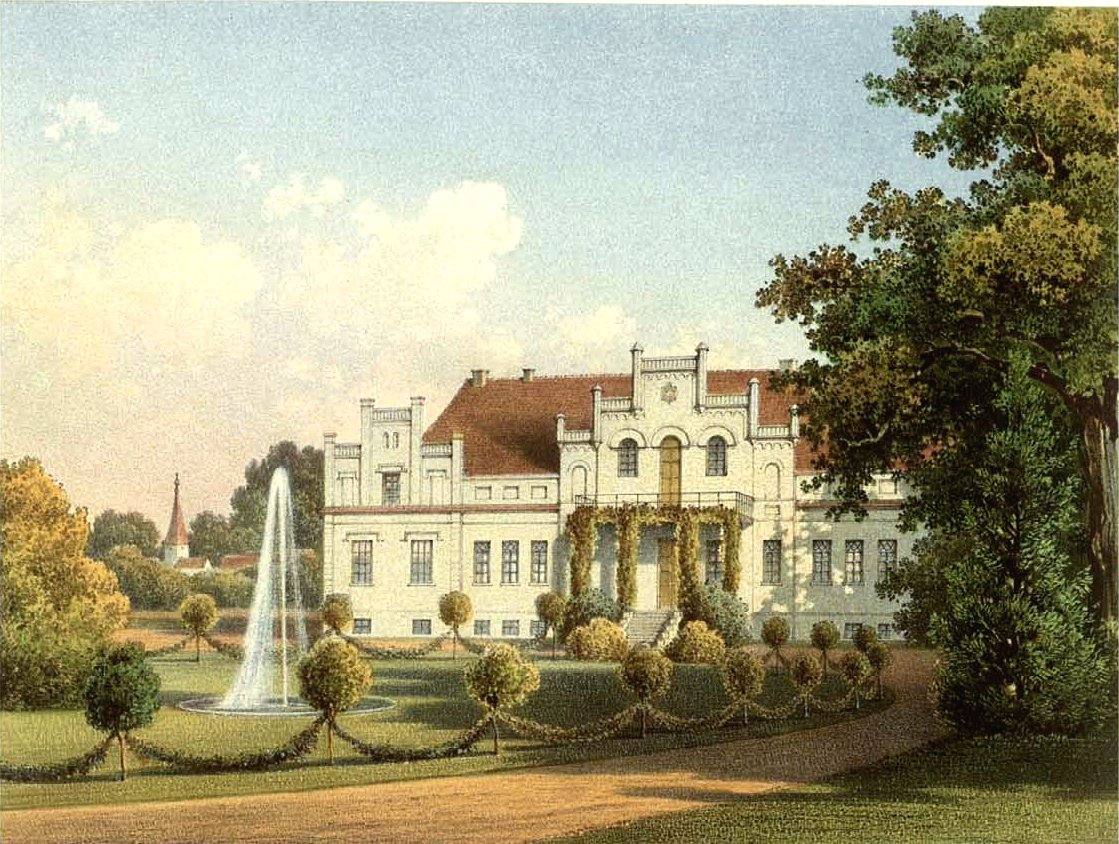
19th-century view of the Przebendowski Palace

In the First Partition of Poland in 1772, in which the Kingdom of Prussia annexed most of Pomerelia, the town was incorporated into the Kingdom, and administered within the new province of West Prussia. Its name in German changed from Weyersfrey to Neustadt in Westpreußen, a name which was in use also before. The affix "in West Prussia" was added to the town's name in order to avoid confusion with a number of other towns carrying the same name. Decisive factors which boosted the development of the town in the 19th century were the 1818 establishment of Landkreis Neustadt, an administrative district, and the construction of the Danzig (Gdańsk) – Stettin (Szczecin) railway line, to which Neustadt was connected with a train station in 1870. Neustadt became part of the German Empire in 1871 during the Prussian-led unification of Germany. During the second half of the 19th century, a significant number of Jewish families from the region began migrating to Syracuse, New York, including the Shubert theatrical family. Kashubians and Poles formed 59.3% of population in the district area of the city around this time. The city itself, however, was predominantly German. According to the census of 1910, the city had a population of 9,804, of which 6,970 (71%) were Germans, 2,421 (25%) were Kashubians and 394 (4%) were Poles.

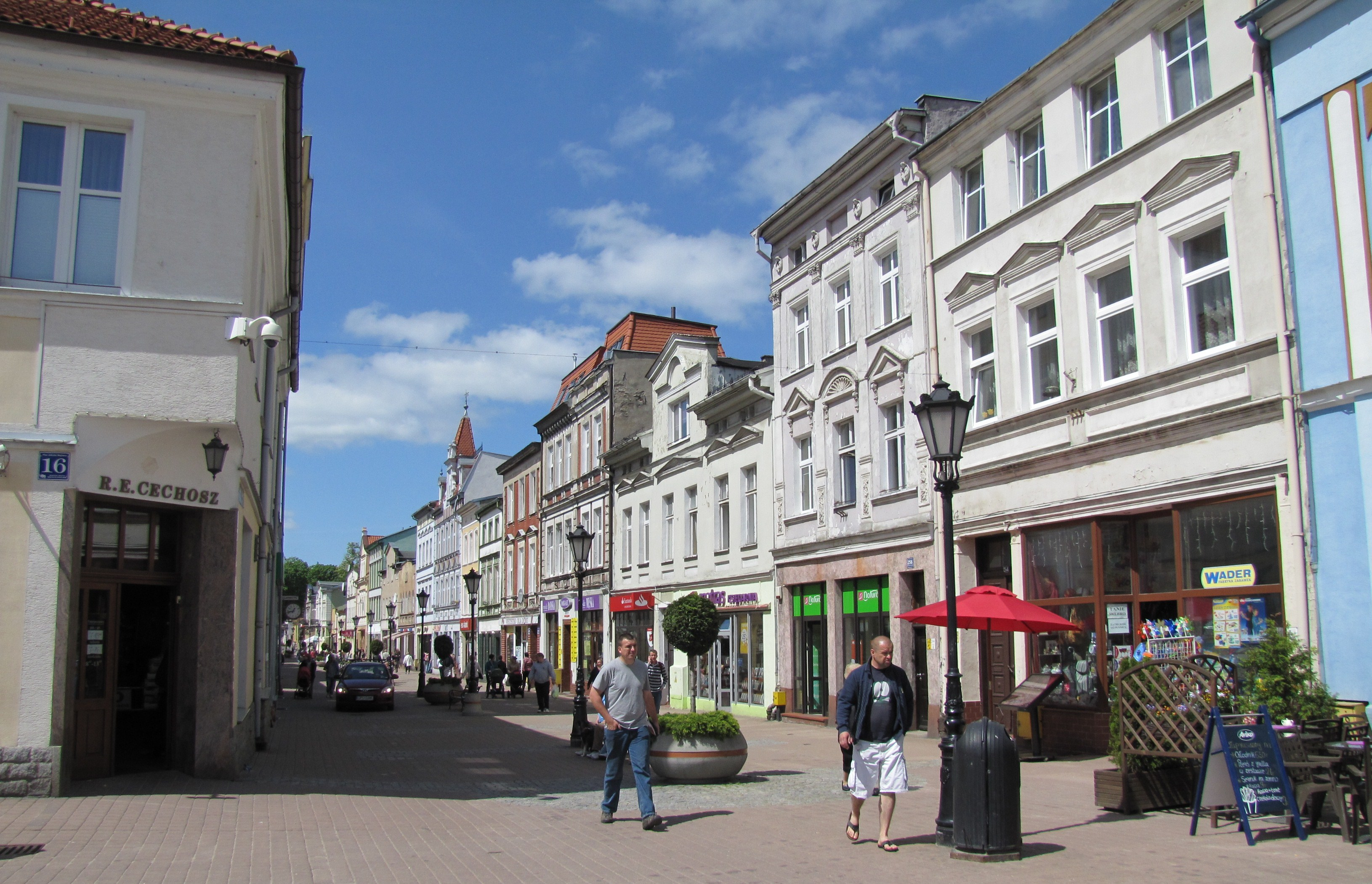
Historical architecture of the Old Town

In 1905, Neustadt had a Protestant church, two Catholic churches, a synagogue, a grammar school, a preparatory school for a training college for school teachers, a training college for evangelical school teachers, a mental asylum, a local court, a forest office, cigarette factories, sawmills, a brewery, a cattle trade and wood trade as well as grain trade. During the Partitions, the German authorities led a systemic campaign of Germanization against local the Polish and Kashubian populations, which resisted by organizing the secret patriotic organization Zwiazek Filomatów, distributing the Polish newspaper Gazeta Gdańska, and by establishing various local economic initiatives.

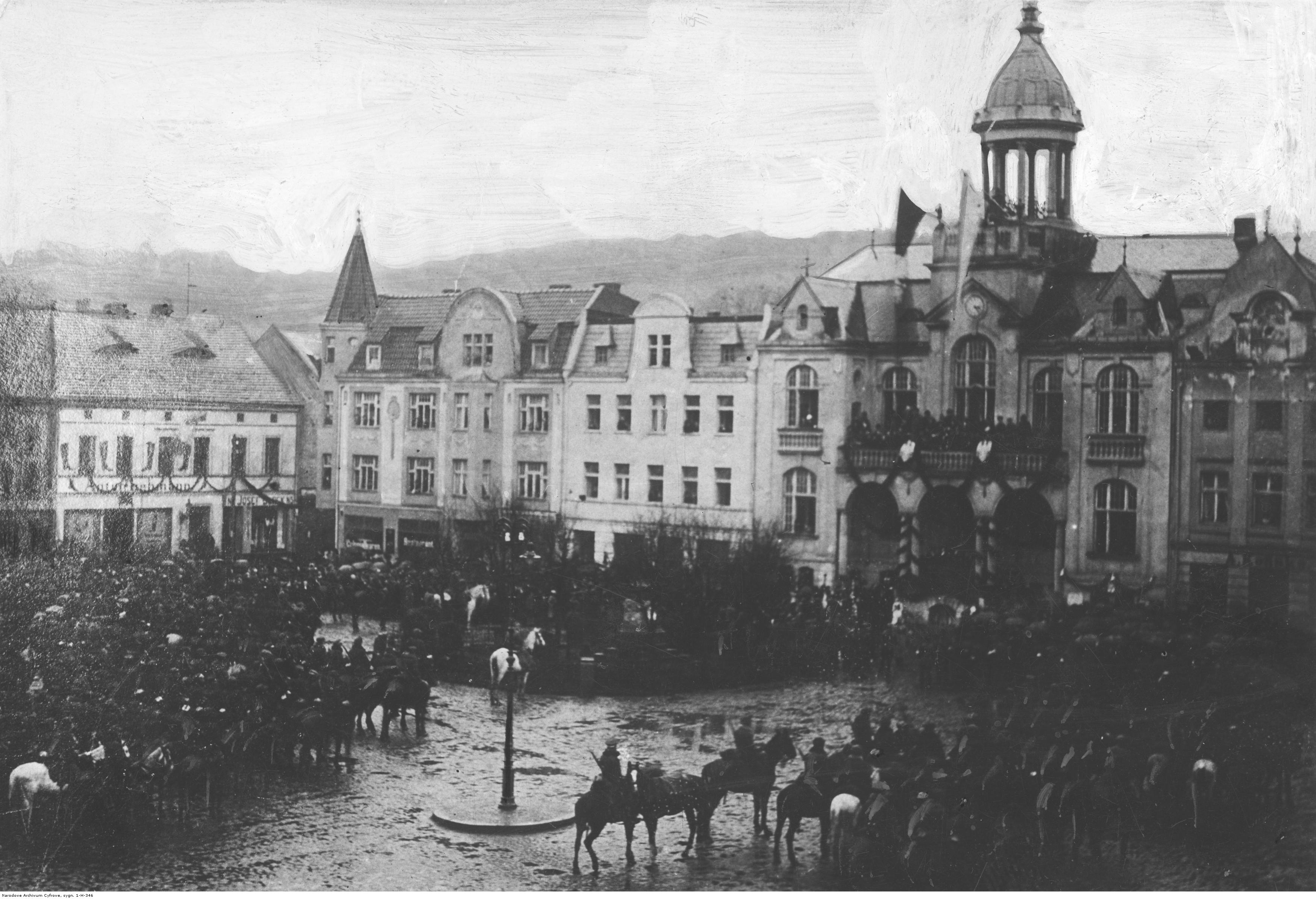
Polish soldiers in Wejherowo in 1920 after Poland regained its independence

Until 1919, Neustadt belonged to the administrative region of Regierungsbezirk Danzig in the Province of West Prussia in Germany. After World War I and the re-establishment of independent Poland, the town was integrated into the Second Polish Republic. Wejherowo was the capital of Wejherowo County in Pomeranian Voivodeship, becoming a headquarters of state administration responsible for the maritime economy. In 1923–1928, there was a special educational center in Wejherowo, in which about 300 Polish orphans lived and got education after their rescue from war-stricken Siberia with the help of Japan in 1920–1922.

=== World War II ===
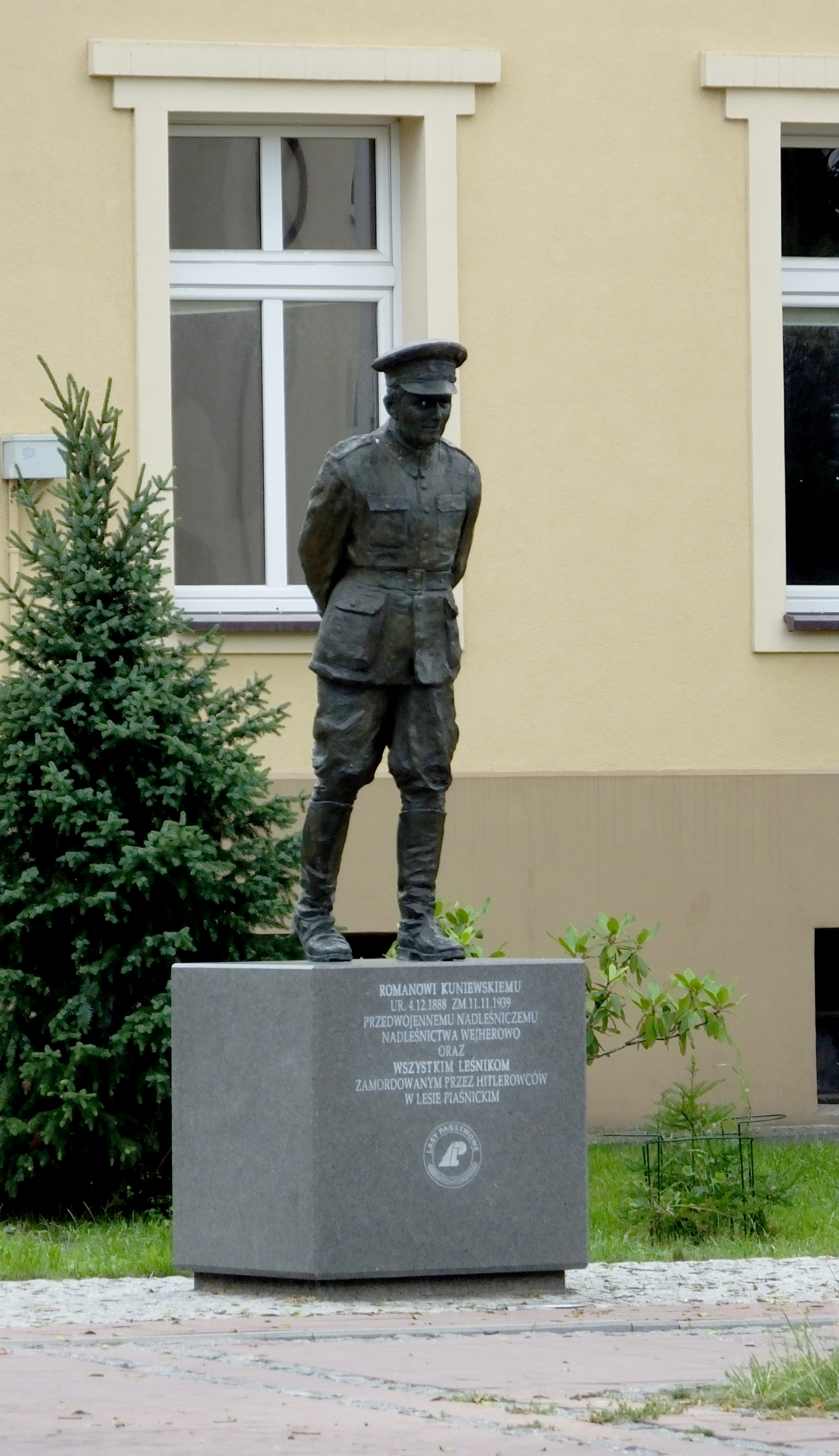
Monument to Polish foresters murdered in Piaśnica

On 9 September 1939, during the invasion of Poland, which marked the beginning of World War II, Wejherowo was captured by the Wehrmacht. Afterwards it was annexed by Nazi Germany and administered as part of Regierungsbezirk Danzig in the newly formed province of Reichsgau Danzig-West Prussia. Most of the town's Jewish community was murdered by the Nazis during the occupation, while many local Poles were also victims of the Nazi extermination policy.

The Einsatzkommando 16 and SS Wachsturmbann "Eimann" entered the county in the first half of September 1939 to commit various crimes against the population. Poles arrested both in Wejherowo and the county were imprisoned in the local prison, and afterwards transported to the nearby village of Piaśnica Wielka, which was the site of a mass murder of about 12,000 Poles in 1939. Among people murdered there were the city's mayor Teodor Roman Bolduan and the wójt of gmina Wejherowo (head of the local gmina) Edward Łakomy. Also Polish students from local high schools were massacred there. Numerous Poles arrested during the Intelligenzaktion in other cities of the region were also briefly held in the local prison before they were murdered in Piaśnica. Among them were local officials, merchants, activists, teachers, priests and civilian defenders of Gdynia. Local teachers were also among Polish teachers and principals murdered in the Mauthausen concentration camp.

In March 1945, Wejherowo was captured by the Soviet Red Army. After the war, in 1945, Wejherowo was reintegrated with Poland. Its first post-war mayor was Bernard Szczęsny, who during the German occupation was part of the Polish resistance movement, was imprisoned in the Stutthof concentration camp and escaped during a death march. Some German perpetrators were not sentenced for their involvement in the crimes committed against Poles in Wejherowo and even retained public offices, including Gustav Bamberger, the town's deputy mayor under German occupation, who participated in the selection of prisoners in the local jail. After the war he served as the deputy mayor of Hanover in West Germany.

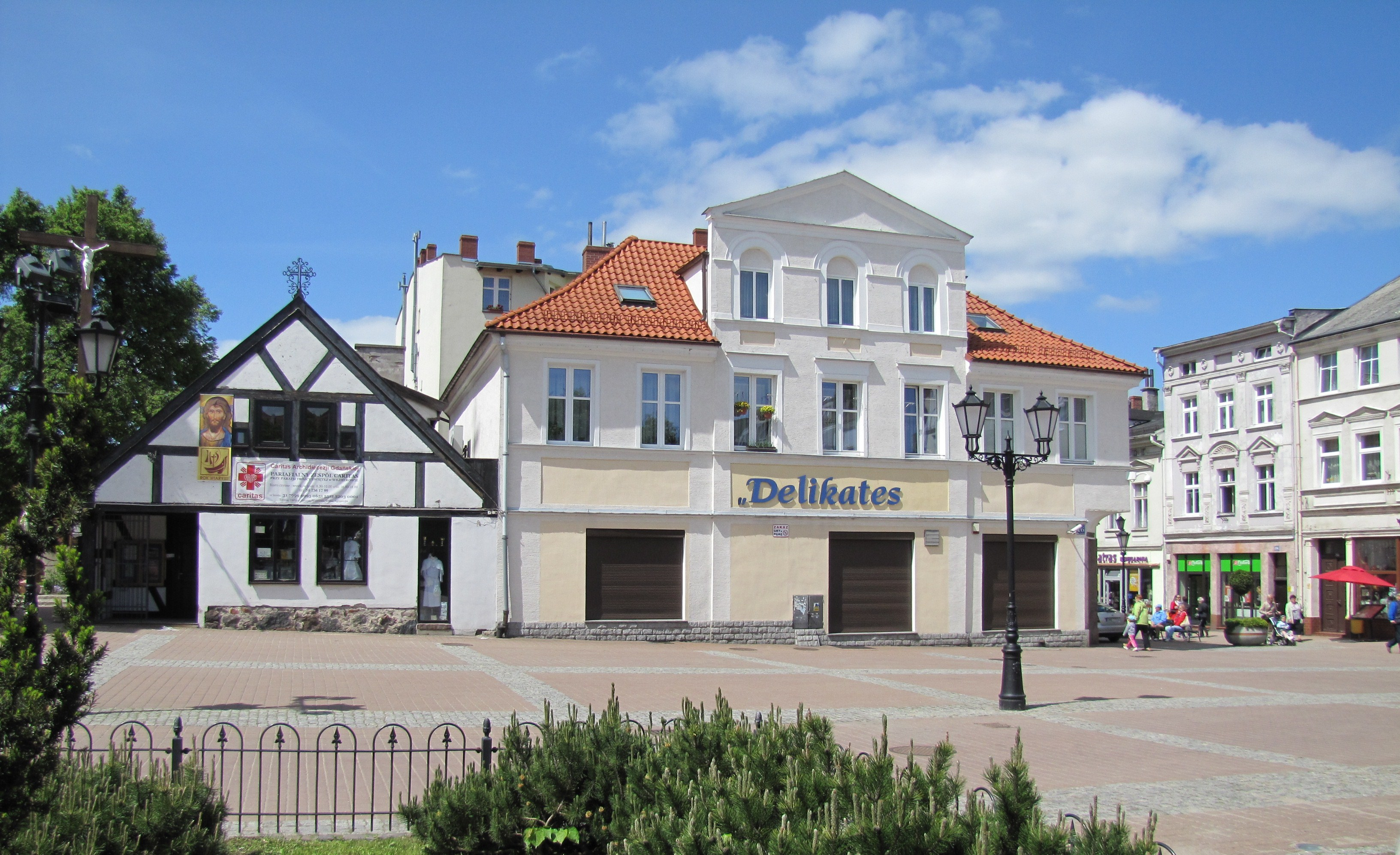
An 18th-century timber-framed home (left)

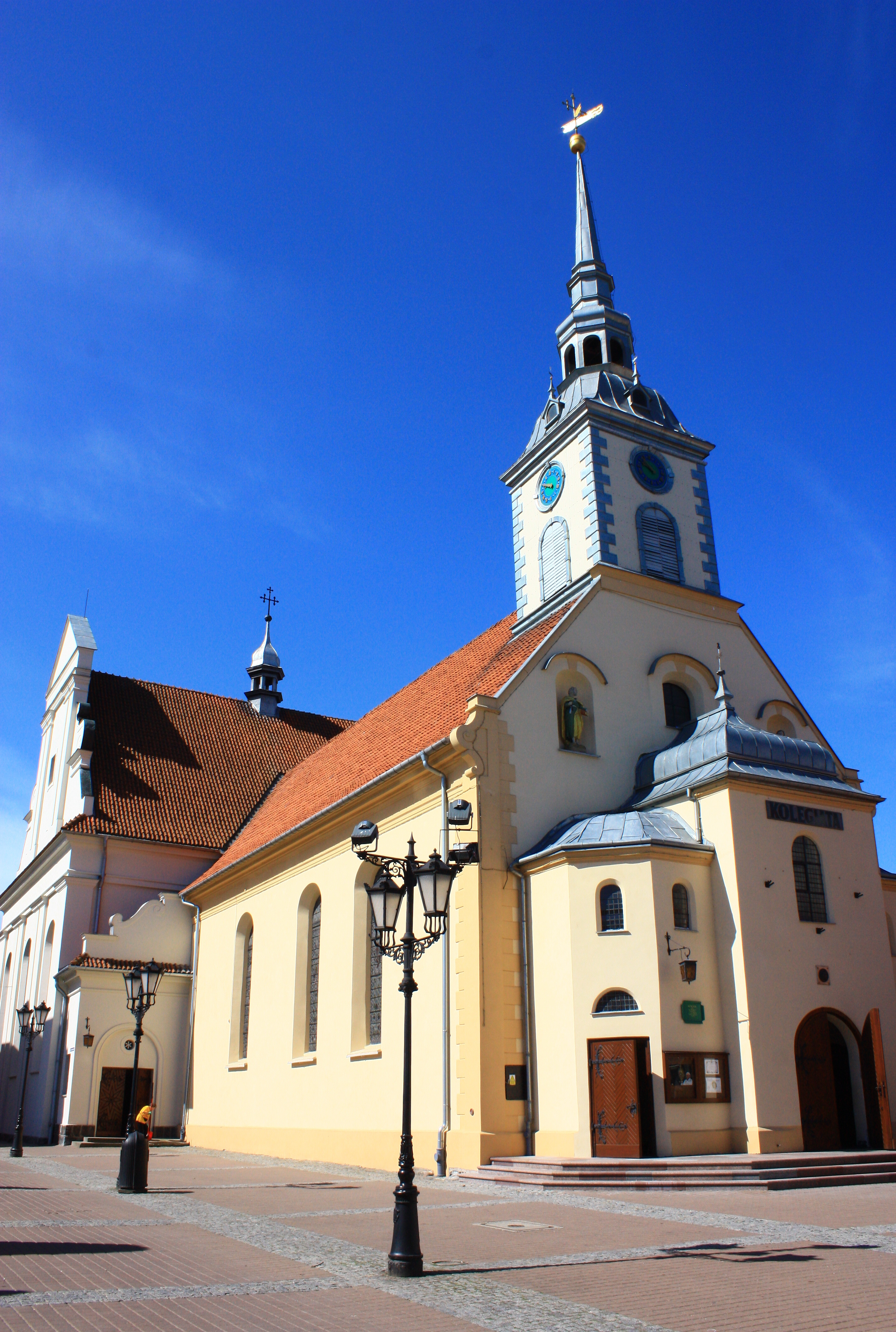
Trinity Church, 1754-1755

=== Number of inhabitants by year ===
| Year | Number | Remarks |
|---|---|---|
| 1789 | 700 | |
| 1831 | 1,690 | |
| 1845 | 1,800 | |
| 1853 | 2,500 | |
| 1865 | 3,200 | |
| 1875 | 4,506 | |
| 1880 | 4,715 | |
| 1890 | 5,546 | incl. 2,336 Protestants, 3,039 Catholics and 160 Jews (240 Poles) |
| 1905 | 8,389 | incl. 3,044 Protestants, 5,171 Catholics, 26 other Christians and 148 Jews |
| 1921 | 8,786 | |
| 1943 | 16,490 | |
| 1948 | 13,400 | |
| 1960 | 24,500 | |
| 1970 | 33,800 | |
| 1980 | 42,400 | |
| 1990 | 46,800 | |
| 2000 | 46,200 | |
| 2006 | 47,159 | |
| 2011 | 49,922 | |
| 2021 | 48,735 | |

== Culture ==
- Museum of Kashubian and Pomeranian Writing and Music, located in the Przebendowski Palace

== Sports ==
The local football club is Gryf Wejherowo. It competes in the lower leagues.

== Education ==
- Kaszubsko-Pomorska Szkoła Wyższa

== Gallery ==
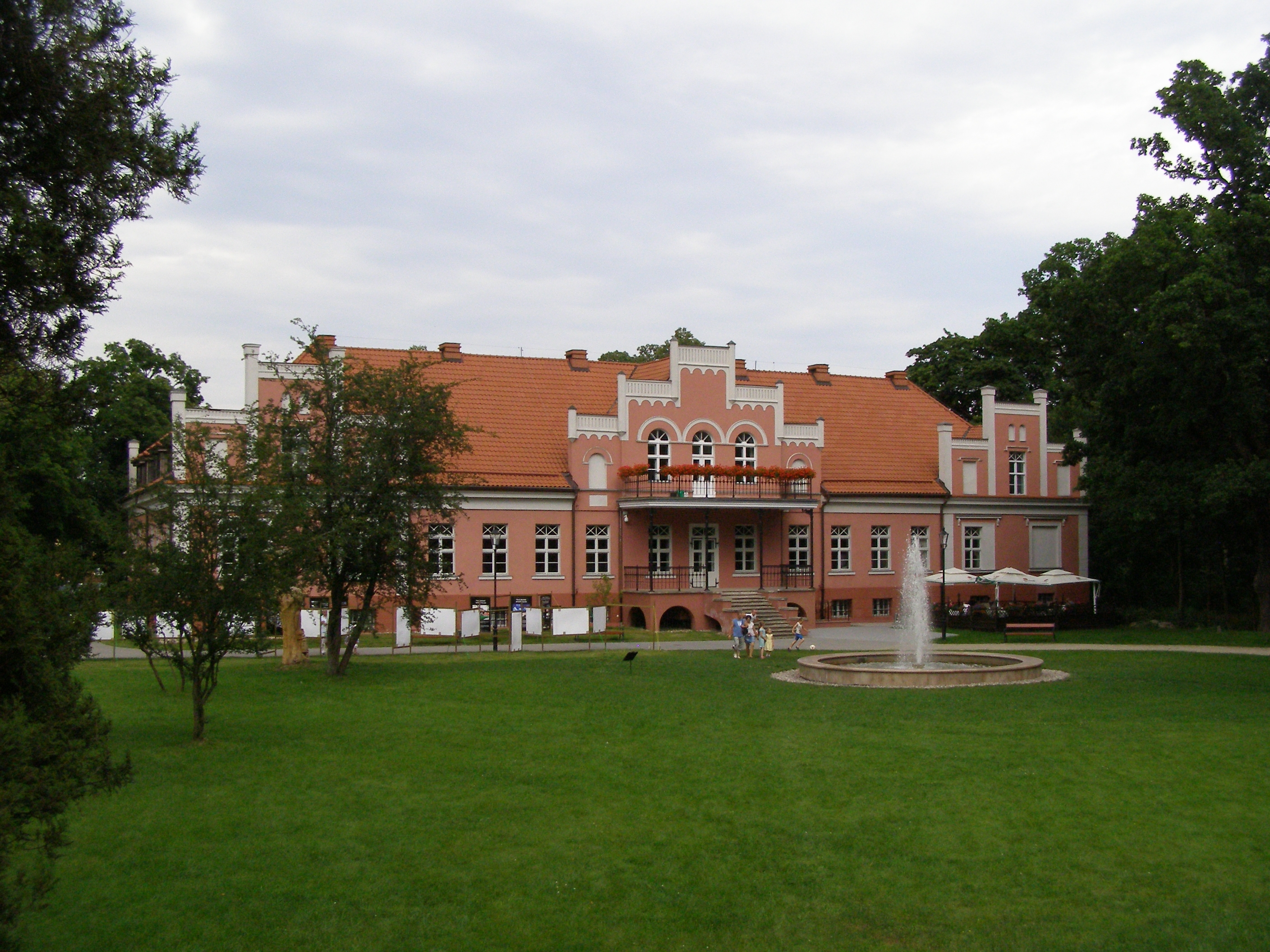
Przebendowski Palace

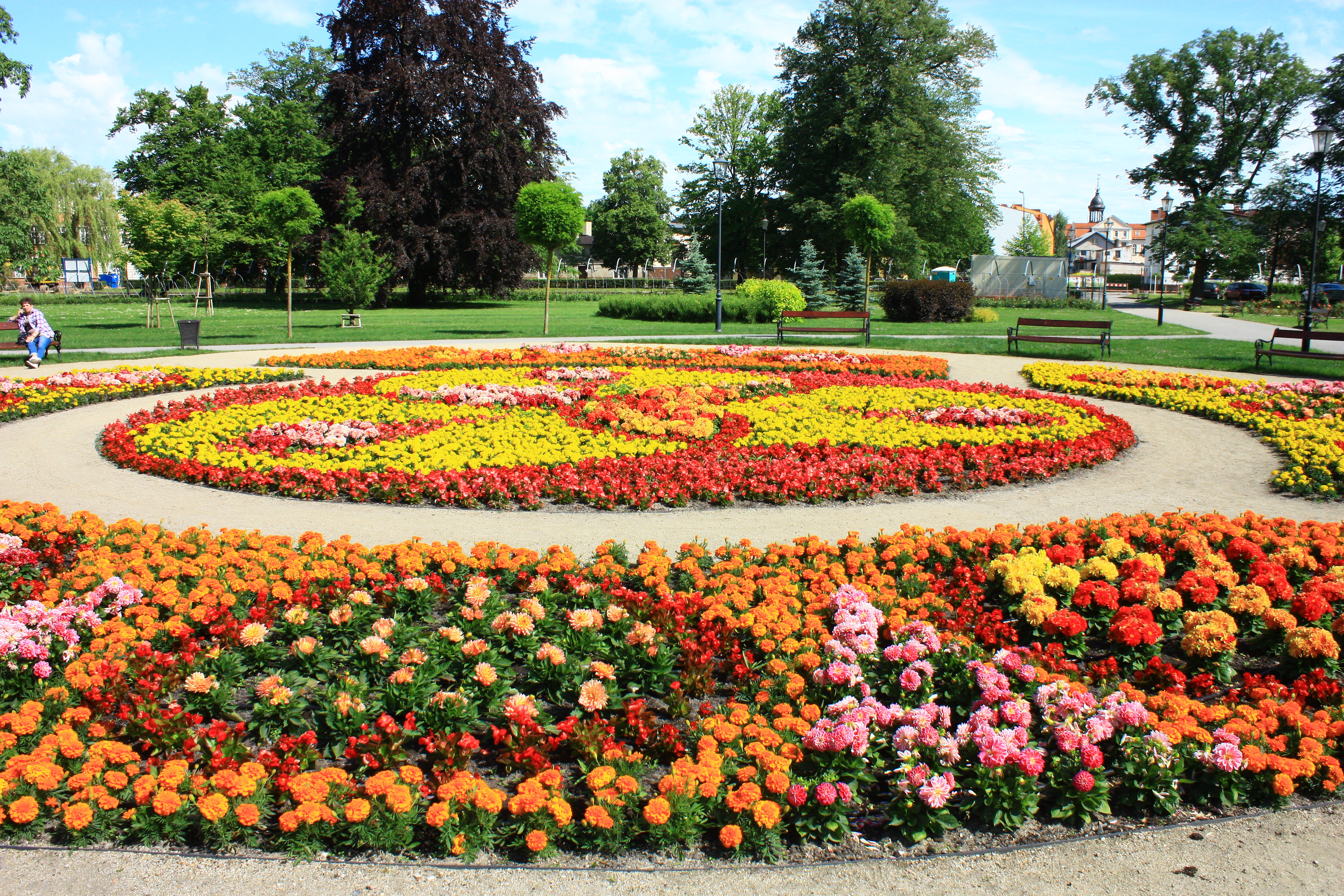
Aleksander Majkowski Park

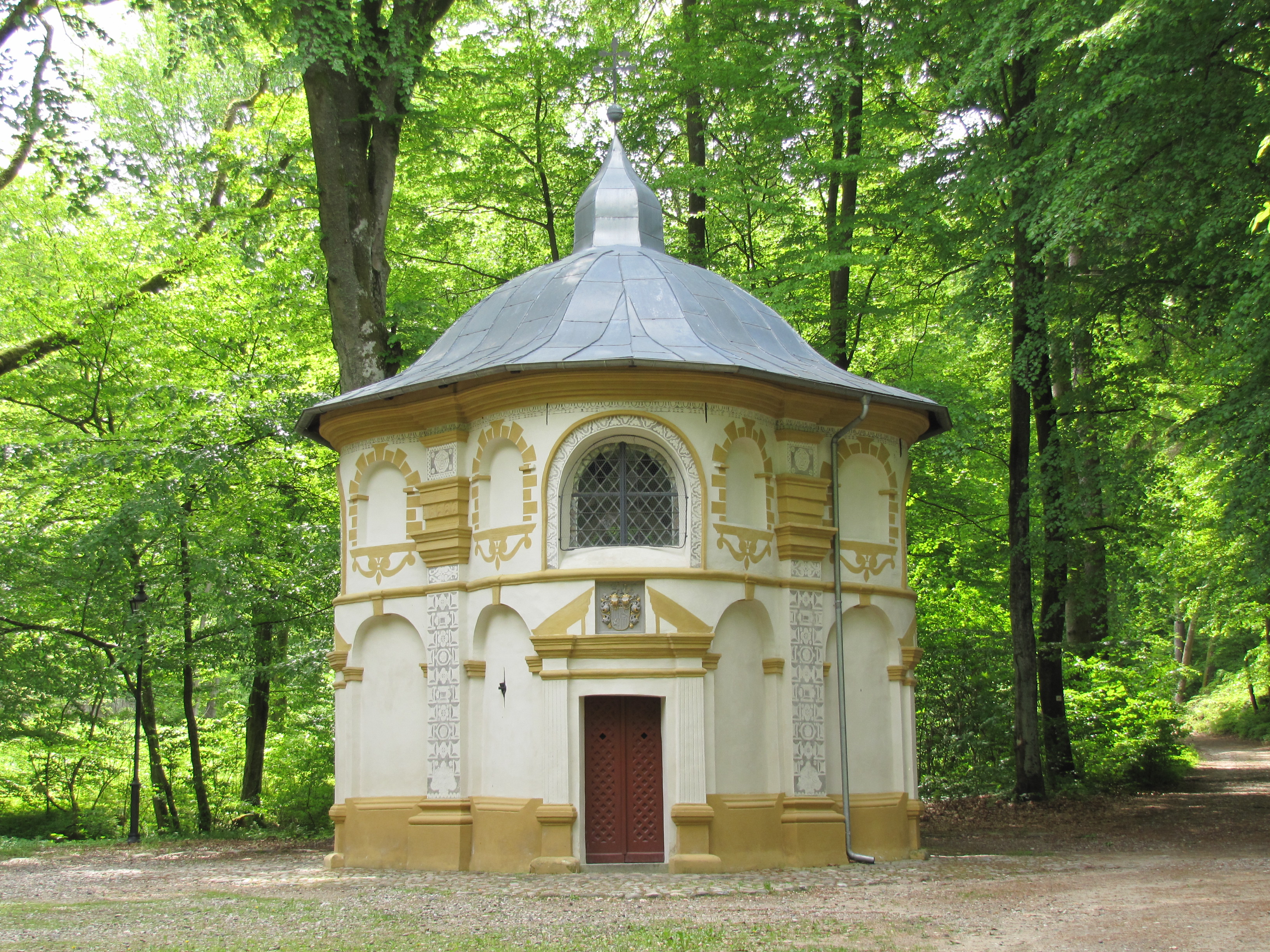
Wejherowo Calvary

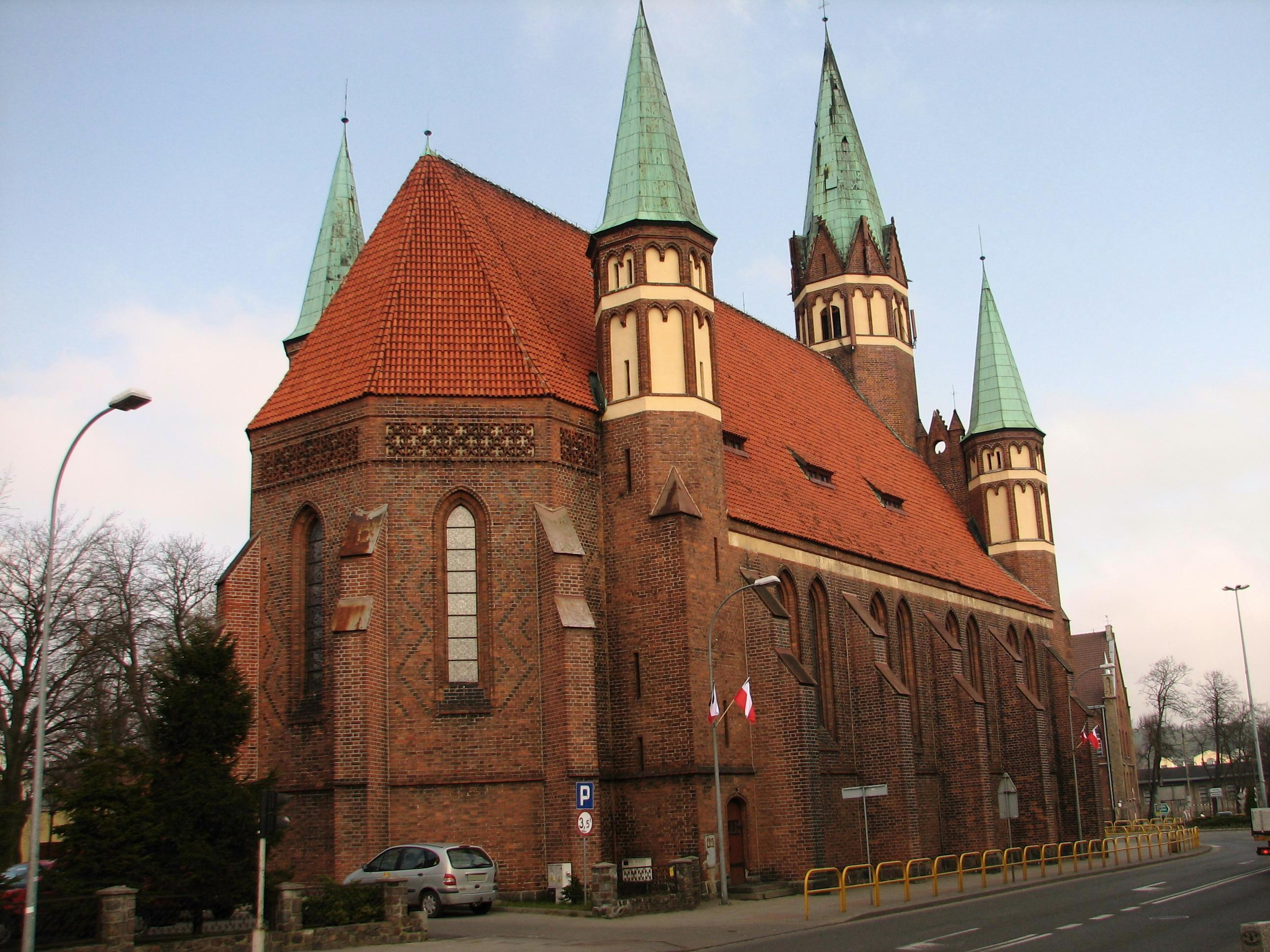
Saint Leo church

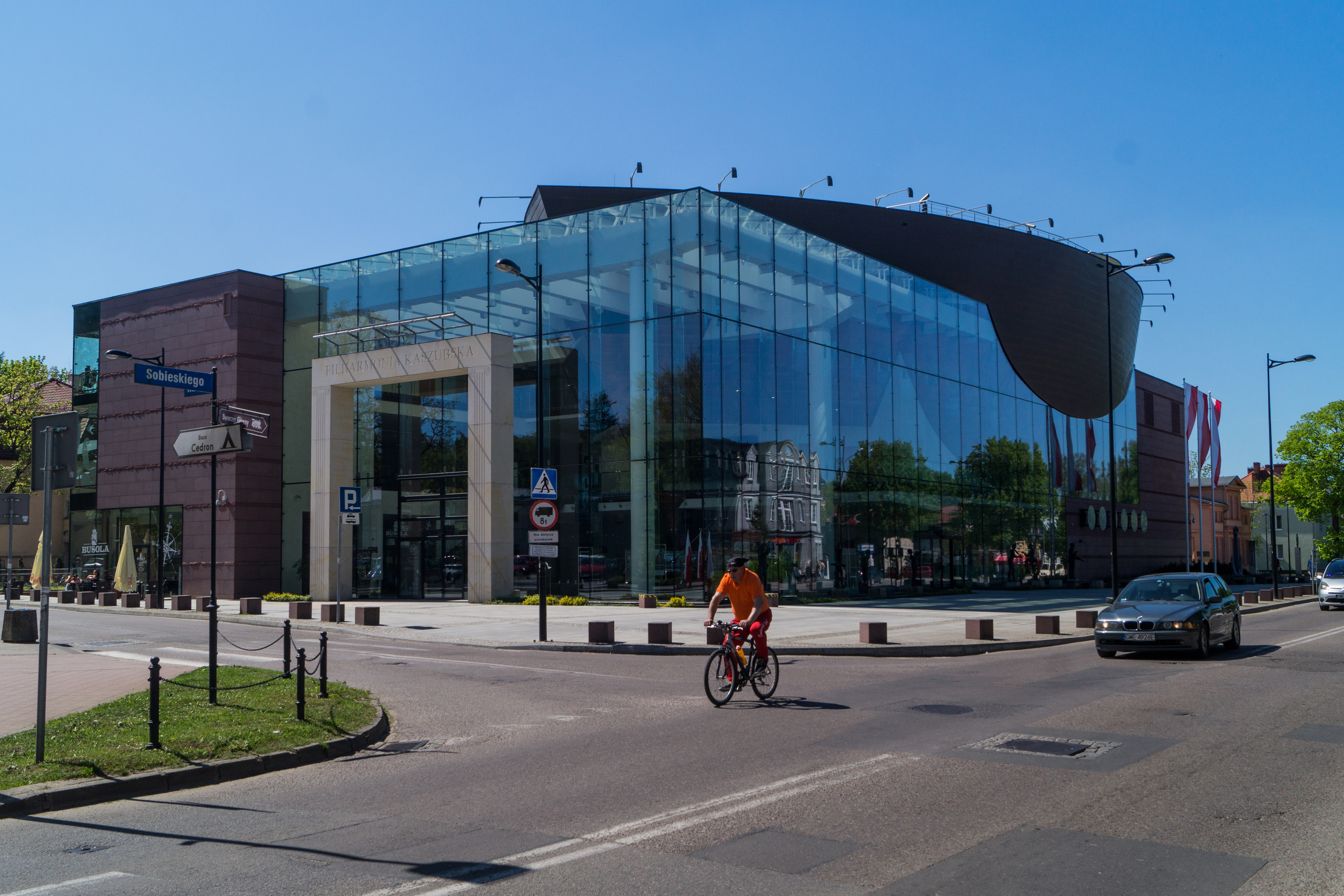
Kashubian Philharmonic (Filharmonia Kaszubska)

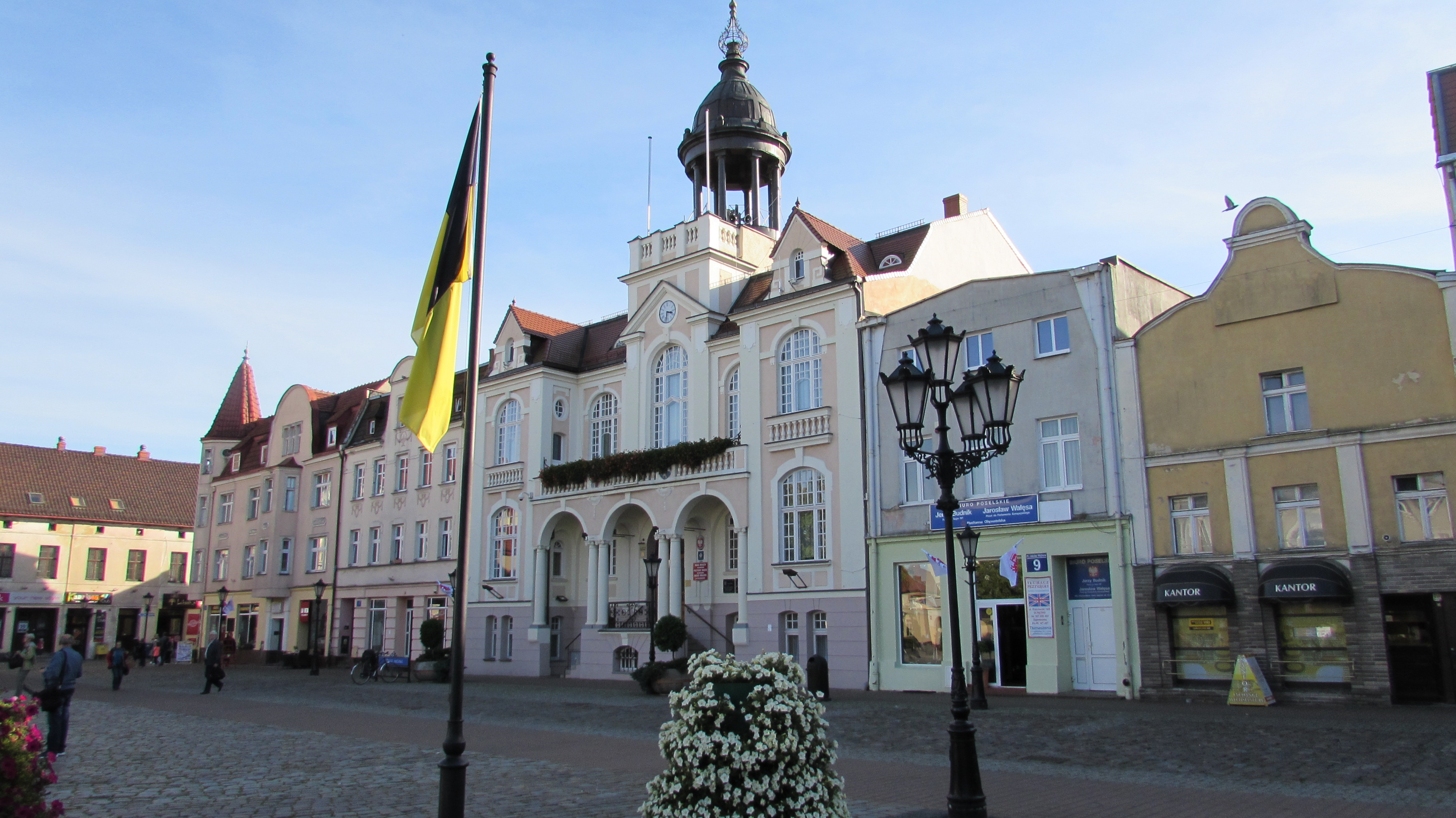
Market Square with the Town Hall

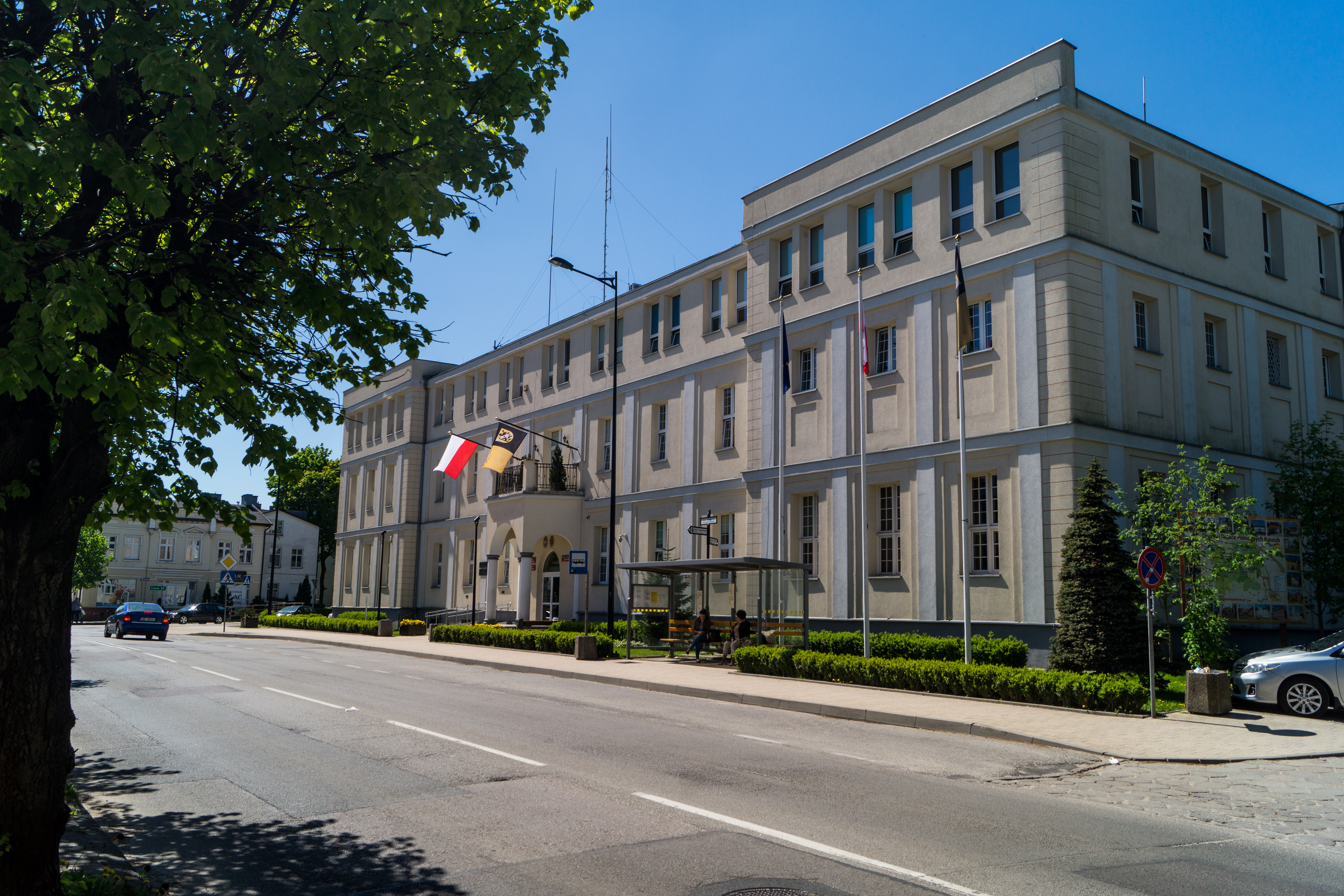
Powiat (county) office

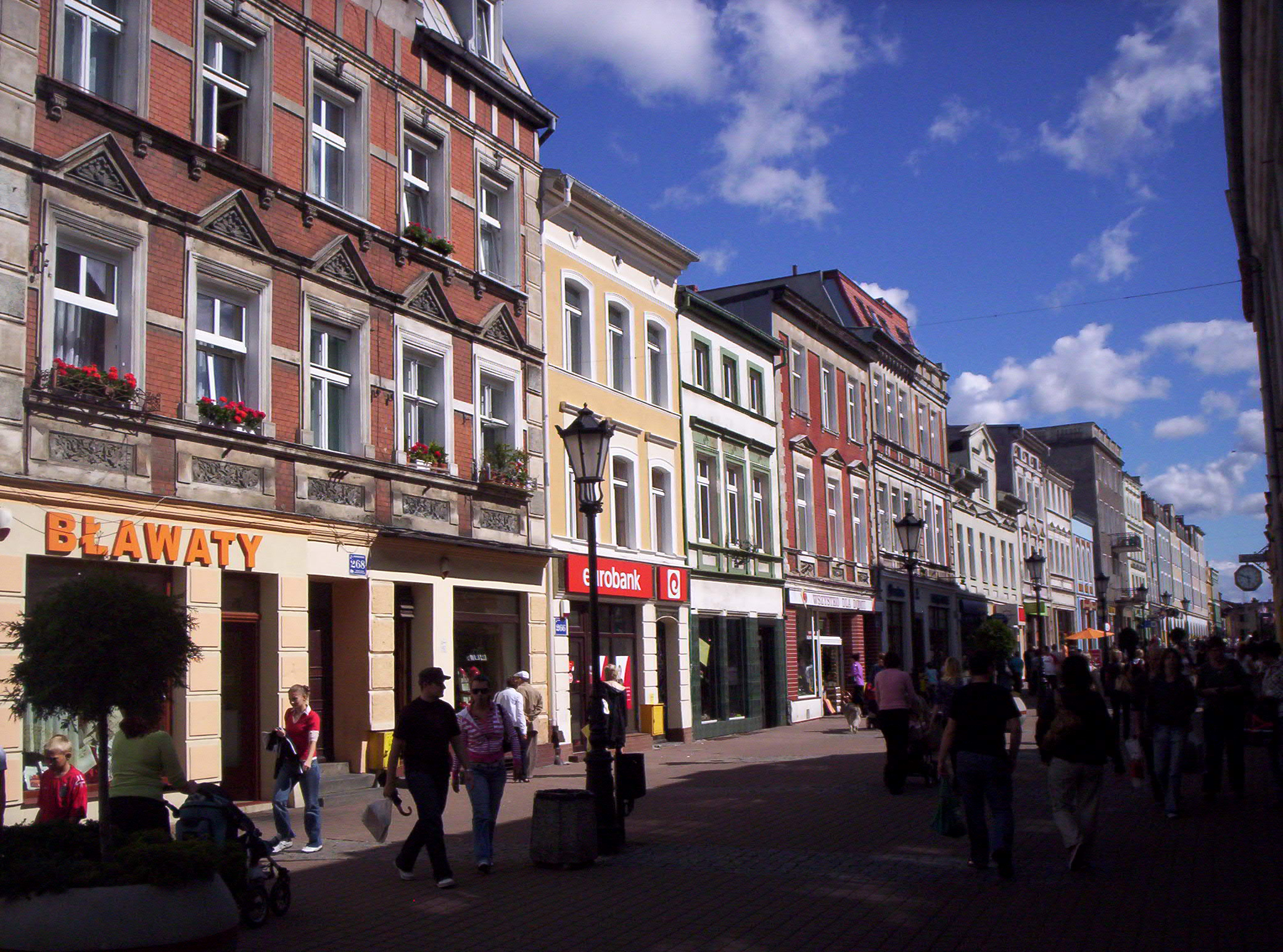
Old townhouses on the Jana Sobieskiego Street

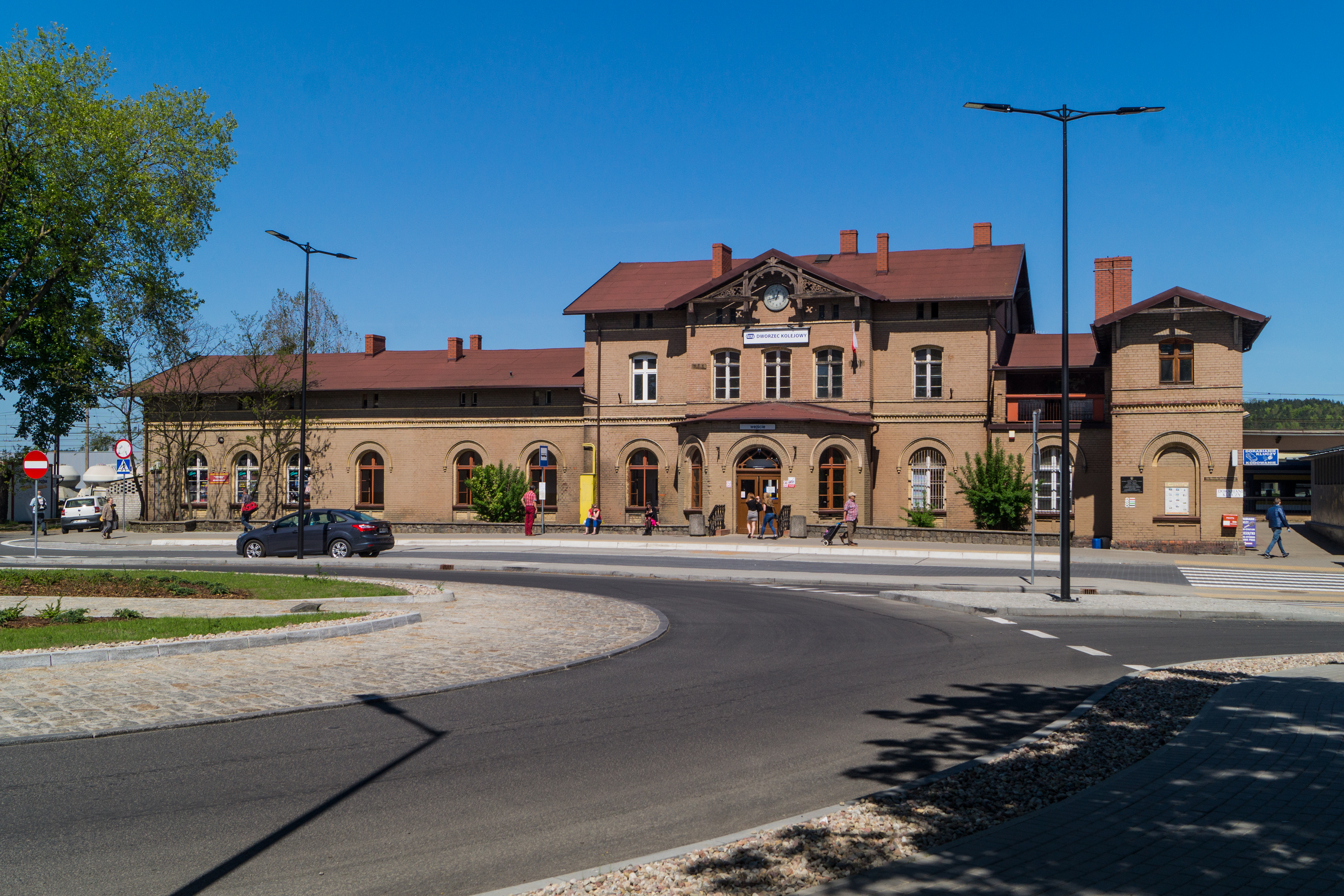
Wejherowo railway station

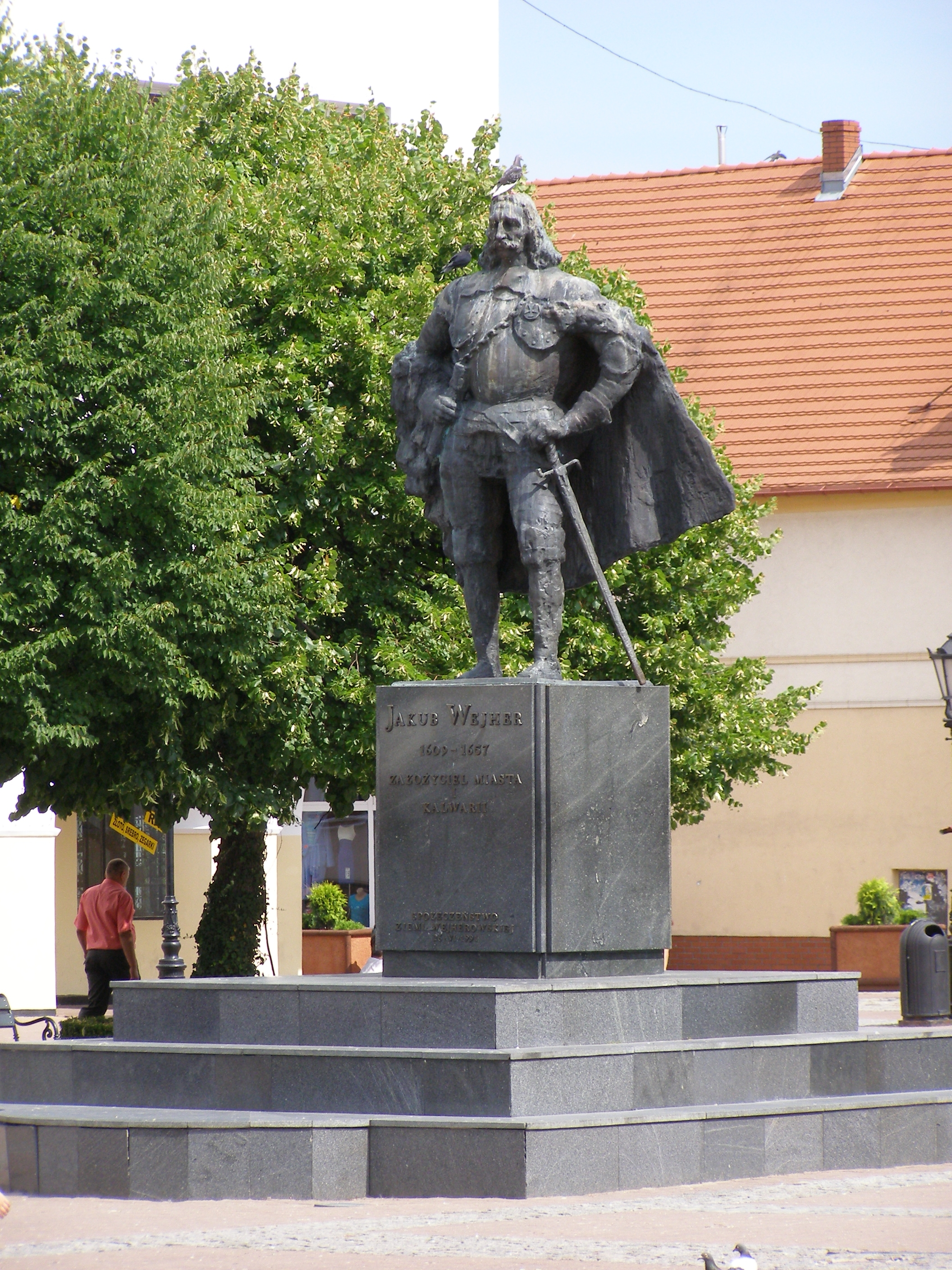
Jakub Wejher monument

== Notable people ==
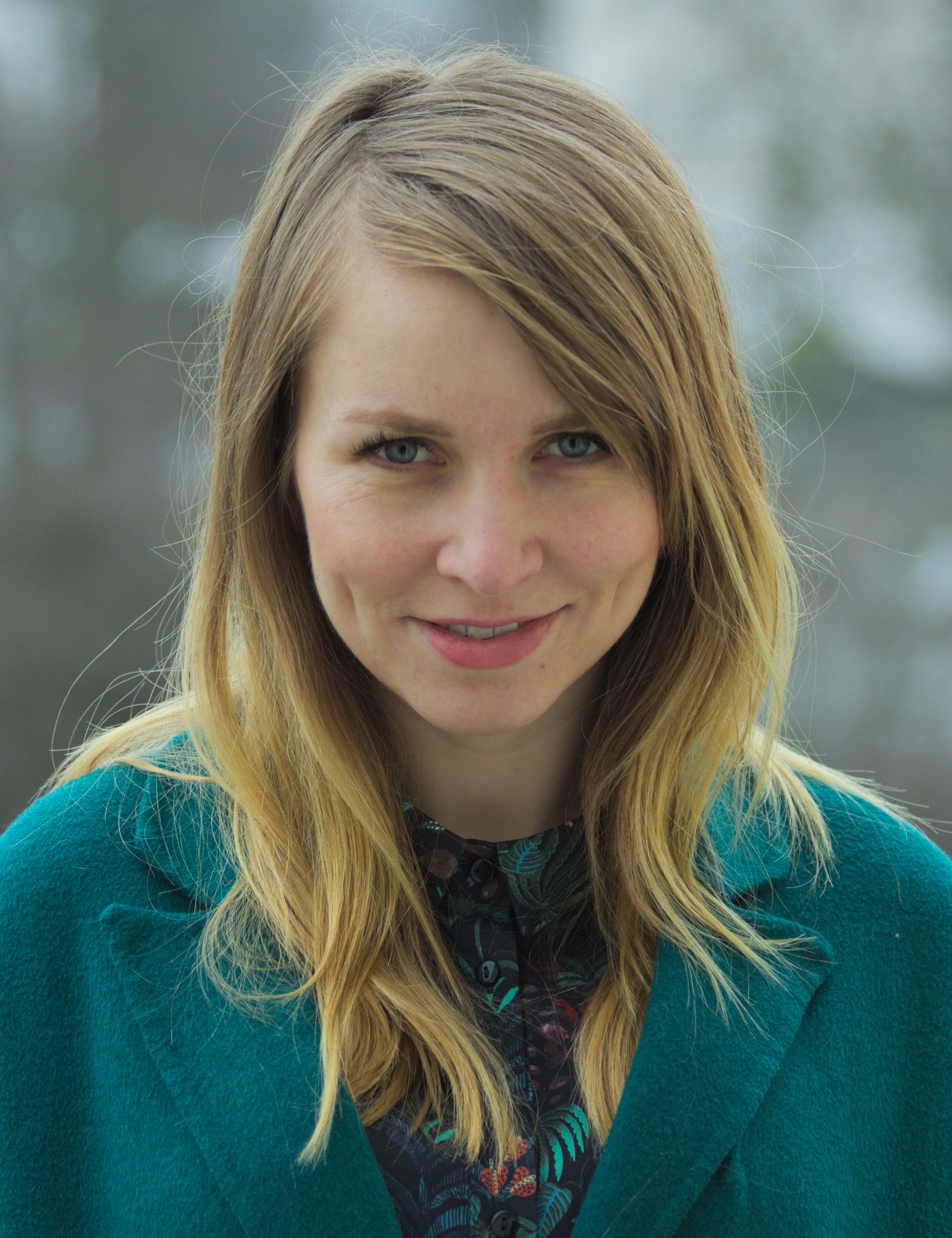
Dorota Maslowska, 2017

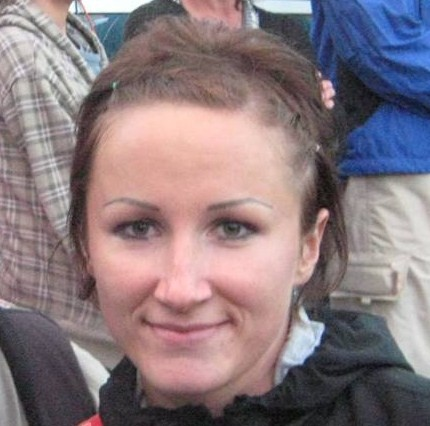
Marta Jeschke, 2010

- Hugo Blaschke (1881–1959), a German dental surgeon, Adolf Hitler's personal dentist
- Paul Gottlieb Nipkow (1860–1940), a German technician; invented the Nipkow disk early TV transmission technology
- Paul Peter Rhode (1871–1945), a Kashubian German-born prelate of the Roman Catholic Church
- Henryk Szczepański (1933–2015), footballer who competed in the 1960 Summer Olympics
- Henryk Dampc (1935–2004), a Polish amateur boxer, competed at the 1960 Summer Olympics
- Ryszard Kunze (born 1939), a Polish fencer, competed in the 1960 Summer Olympics
- Hubert Skrzypczak (born 1943), a boxer from Poland, competed in the 1968 Summer Olympics
- Jerzy Budnik (born 1951), politician
- Marcin Miotk (pl) (born 1973), mountaineer
- Kinga Baranowska (born 1975), mountaineer, she climbs without the use of supplemental oxygen
- Dorota Masłowska (born 1983), a Polish writer, playwright, columnist and journalist
- Marta Jeschke (born 1986), a Polish 200 metre sprinter, competed in the 2008 and 2012 Summer Olympics
- Małgorzata Ławrynowicz (born 1988), a Polish group rhythmic gymnast, participated at the 2004 Summer Olympics
- Kacper Formela (born 1990), a professional mixed martial artist
- Paweł Poljański (born 1990), a professional racing cyclist

== International relations ==
Wejherowo is twinned with:

- Iwano-Frankowsk, Ukraine
- Postawy, Belarus
- Tyresö, Sweden
