= General Director for Environmental Protection =

Polish central government administration body

- Generalny Dyrektor Ochrony Środowiska

Agency overview
- Formed: October 3, 2008
- Jurisdiction: Poland
- Headquarters: Former building of the Directorate General of State Forests
- Minister responsible: Minister of Environment
- Agency executive: Piotr Otawski, General Director for Environmental Protection
- Parent department: Ministry of Environment
- Website: Official website

The General Director for Environmental Protection (Polish: Generalny Dyrektor Ochrony Środowiska) is a central government administration body in Poland responsible for environmental protection and nature conservation, carrying out its tasks with the assistance of the General Directorate for Environmental Protection.

The headquarters of the General Director and most units of the General Directorate for Environmental Protection are located in the former building of the Directorate General of State Forests.

The office was established under the Act of October 3, 2008, on providing information on the environment and its protection, public participation in environmental protection, and environmental impact assessments. It performs tasks specified in Article 127 of this act and is also an authority in the field of nature conservation as per Article 91 of the Act of April 16, 2004, on nature conservation, an authority in the field of environmental protection as per Article 376 of the Act of April 27, 2001 – Environmental Protection Law, and a participant in the national system of eco-management and audit as per the Act of July 15, 2011, on the national system of eco-management and audit (EMAS).

The General Director for Environmental Protection reports to the Minister of Environment. The General Director is appointed by the Prime Minister at the request of the minister after an open and competitive recruitment process. The Prime Minister is also responsible for dismissing the General Director. The position can be held by an individual meeting statutory requirements, including citizenship, education, professional experience, and a clean criminal record for intentional offenses.

== General Directors for Environmental Protection ==
- Michał Kiełsznia from January 23, 2008, to November 26, 2015
- Jakub Dziubecki from November 27, 2015, to February 15, 2016
- Krzysztof Lissowski from February 15, 2016, to May 31, 2018
- Andrzej Szweda-Lewandowski from June 1, 2018 to December 22, 2023
- Piotr Otawski from February 27, 2024
