= Internet in Poland =

The term "Internet in Poland" refers to various aspects related to the state of the Internet in the Republic of Poland. This encompasses issues such as Internet access, governance, freedom, and infrastructure, as well as social, economic, and political factors that contribute to the digital landscape in Poland.

As of 2024, 95.9% of households in Poland had internet access, of which 72.1% had fixed broadband with median download speeds of 152.13 Mbps and upload speeds of 45.24 Mbit/s, while access to mobile broadband internet was present in 75.9% of households. Overall, 99.9% of households with children and 98.7% of businesses reported having broadband internet access. 56.1% of all fixed-line connections are fiber-optic, including 56.2% between 300 and 1000 Mbit/s

Internet usage in Poland varies by age group, with significantly higher rates among the younger generations, as 100% of those aged 18–24 and 96% of those aged 25–34 use the Internet. However, there is a notable digital divide, as only 25% of individuals aged 65 and older are connected.

Moreover, data shows that 58.5% of the population in Poland engages with e-government platforms, accessing a range of online resources and public services.

== History ==
The first analogue Internet connection was launched on September 26, 1990, and had a speed of approximately 9600 bits per second. The Institute of Nuclear Physics of the Polish Academy of Sciences received the first IP address in Poland (192.86.14.0) on 19 November 1990, assigned to it by the United States Department of Defense. This institute was also the recipient of the first e-mail sent to Poland, sent by CERN on 20 November 1990, and received on a MicroVax II computer.

== Facts and figures ==
- Top-level domain: .pl
- Internet users: 36.68 million users; 88.4% of the population (2023)
- Fixed broadband: 6.4 million subscriptions, 17th in the world; 16.6% of the population, 54th in the world (2012).
- Wireless broadband: 18.9 million subscriptions, 16th in the world; 49.3% of the population, 33rd in the world (2012).
- Internet hosts: 13.3 million hosts, 12th in the world (2012).
- IPv4: 19.4 million addresses allocated, 21st in the world, 0.5% of the world total, 505.9 addresses per 1000 people (2012).
- 70.6% of households in Poland with no internet access indicated that they have no need to use it.
- In August 2020, the number of mobile device users exceeded the number of fixed-line internet users.

== Digital progress ==
=== EU comparison ===
The European Commission's 2022 Digital Economy and Society Index report evaluates Poland's digital sector among 27 European Union (EU) nations. Poland is 24th in human capital, with 43% of citizens having basic digital skills and 3.5% working as Information and Communication Technology specialists. For connectivity, Poland ranks 25th, with 69% of households having broadband coverage. In digital technology integration, 19% of businesses use cloud services and 8% employ Big Data with in a ranking of 24th. Digital public services rank 22nd, showing advancements in e-government and open data, but requiring better online service availability.

Poland's Recovery and Resilience Plan (RRP), integral to the "Path to the Digital Decade Policy Programme", allocates over EUR 7.5 billion, 21.3% of its total fund, to digital transformation post-COVID-19. It prioritizes enhancing digital infrastructure, including broadband and 5G network development, and invests in network deployment, digital public services, education, digital skills, and cybersecurity.

=== Broadband ===
==== Fixed broadband ====
As of 2022, 65% of Polish households were subscribed to 100 Mbit/s broadband, surpassing the EU average of 55%. The country's Fixed Very High Capacity Network (VHCN) coverage also grew from 65% in 2020 to 71% in 2022, nearing the EU average of 73%. Furthermore, the increase in Fibre to the Premises (FTTP) coverage from 45% to 60% during the same period marked progress, placing Poland above the EU average of 56%.

==== Mobile broadband ====
In 2021, Poland's mobile broadband take-up among individuals was 84%, closely aligning with the EU average of 87%. However, in terms of 5G coverage, Poland is behind the EU, with 63% coverage in 2022, versus the EU average of 81%. Moreover, Poland's progress towards full 5G deployment encounters challenges, Poland completes 5G auction on October 25, 2023, and T-mobile Poland claims that has over 4000 base station with C band n78 on it. On March 25, 2025, the auction for the 5G 700 MHz band reservation ended.

=== Digital public services ===
In 2022, 63% of Polish internet users utilized e-government services, which is below the EU average of 74%. In contrast, Poland's e-health record accessibility achieved a score of 86 out of 100, exceeding the EU average of 72 out of 100. The mObywatel app plays a significant role in Poland's digital public services strategy.

The mObywatel app, a government service for individuals launched in 2015, has successfully expanded its user base from 2 million in December 2020 to 9.1 million by December 2022. Originally conceived as a digital wallet for essential documents, including ID cards, driver's licenses, and pensioner cards, its functionality has evolved to support a variety of official interactions. Following the Russian invasion of Ukraine in February 2022, the app was adapted to enable Ukrainian citizens legally residing in Poland to verify their identity throughout the EU.

== Pricing ==
According to an OECD report, the price of Internet access in Poland in September 2012 ranged from $0.45 to $128.12 PPP per megabit per second (Mbit/s) of advertised speed. This places Poland in the middle on the low end (18th lowest out of 34 countries) and at the top on the high end (second highest behind New Zealand at $130.20). This compares with ranges of $0.40 to $23.25 for Germany, $0.40 to $12.35 for the Czech Republic, and $0.53 to $41.70 for the U.S.

According to Eurostat, the OECD and others, Internet access in Poland in the early 2010s was among the most expensive in Europe. This was mostly due to a lack of competition and lack of experience. New operators like Dialog and GTS Energis are designing their own provider lines and are offering more attractive and cheaper services. In February 2011, the Polish Office of Electronic Communication issued an order forcing TPSA to rent 51% of their ADSL lines to other ISPs at 60% discount of their market pricing. As the result, the prices are non-competitive. Other ISP charge as TPSA makes a guaranteed 40% profit, while TPSA has no incentive to lower its consumer prices, because that would result in a lowering of wholesale prices as well.

== ADSL ==
The most popular ADSL services for home users in Poland are Neostrada provided by TPSA and Net24 provided by Netia. Both provide download speeds in the range of 10 to 80 Mbit/s and upload speeds of 1 Mbit/s or more. Business users as well as some home users use Internet DSL TP also offered by TPSA.

=== Neostrada ===
ADSL and VDSL service is offered by Neostrada. According to the Rzeczpospolita newspaper, the TP board decided to liquidate the brand within the 2010 year. The brand's value is estimated at PLN 500 million. The Neostrada brand will be replaced by the Orange brand. The reason for the liquidation is the unification of brands in the France Telecom group and the desire to maintain a single, global Orange brand.

=== Internet DSL TP ===
There is another ADSL option available, targeted mainly at business clients, called Internet DSL TP. The link availability is guaranteed, offers static IP addresses, and a modem with Ethernet interface.

=== Net24 ===
ADSL service called Net24, provided by TP's main competitor Netia. The service can be installed on ISDN lines.

Netia also offers ADSL (BiznesNet24) and SDSL (SuperNet24) subscriptions for business customers, which offer static IP addresses and higher speeds.

=== Multimo ===
ADSL service called Multimo, provided by GTS Energis for TP customers via Bit Stream Access.

=== DialNET DSL ===
ADSL service called DialNET DSL, provided by Dialog now bought by Netia.

== Cable ==
Cable providers such as Multimedia, UPC, Vectra and ASTER offer triple play services.

=== VECTRA ===
Vectra, after the purchase of Multimedia, is the largest cable network in Poland. (Reaches 4.4 million households).

=== INEA ===
Cable provider offering HFC and FTTH internet access from Greater Poland. Initially offered up to 10 Gbit/s for selected locations with FTTH which was reduced later to 8,5 Gbit/s and up to 1 Gbit/s in most locations. HFC offerings are asymmetric and FTTH are symmetric.

=== PLAY ===
UPC has rebranded name to PLAY UPC has upgraded its "Fiber Power" internet service to higher speeds, offering internet with download speeds from 10 Mbit/s up to 1 Gbit/s. (Reaches 3.7 million households). play (p4) buys UPC.

=== HETAN ===
HETAN provides stationary Internet via Satellite to whole Poland for private and business customers with speeds ranging from 10 Mbit/s to 20 Mbit/s in download and from 2 Mbit/s to 6 Mbit/s in upload. HETAN launched its services in August 2011, and is since then market leader in providing internet via KA-satellite services to private households and SME's in Poland. HETAN is the largest reseller of Tooway/Skylogic Services in Poland and also represents Hylass/Avanti.

=== KORBANK ===
KORBANK provides Triple Play, especially in FTTx or ETH technology. The firm allows subscribers to connect and use computer-based telecommunications networks using independent Internet connections boasting high quality and transmission capacity, digital telephony and new generation TV. Operations focus on Lower Silesia and Masovia regions, where telecommunications services are offered to both retail and business clients. KORBANK is also founder of the first in Europe IPTV Platform based on Unicast Protocol - AVIOS.

== Censorship ==
In early 2011, Internet censorship legislation that included the creation of a registry of blocked websites was abandoned by the Polish government, following protests and petitions opposing the proposal.

In 2011, the Office for Electronic Communications reported that law enforcement agencies requested access to telecommunications data (including call logs, telephone locations, and names registered to specific numbers) 1.8 million times, an increase of 500,000 over the number of requests in 2010.

In January 2012, thousands protested Prime Minister Tusk's signing of the Anti-Counterfeiting Trade Agreement (ACTA), establishing international standards for enforcing intellectual property rights, accusing it of facilitating Internet censorship. Additionally, in February, Tusk suspended ratification of ACTA because his government had made insufficient consultations before signing the agreement to ensure it was entirely safe for Polish citizens.

In September 2012, the creator of the website Antykomor.pl, which satirized President Komorowski, was acquitted of charges of defamation. He later received compensation from the European Court of Human Rights in the amount of 200,000 euros.

== See also ==
- CERT Polska, Computer Emergency Response Team for Poland.
- Media of Poland
- Telecommunications in Poland
