= Telecommunications in Poland =

Telecommunications in Poland include radio, television, fixed and mobile telephones, and the Internet.

== Radio and television ==
- Radio stations:
  - State-run public radio operates 5 national networks and 17 regional radio stations; 2 privately owned national radio networks, several commercial stations broadcasting to multiple cities, and many privately owned local radio stations (2007);
  - 7 AM, 1138 FM, and 0 shortwave stations (2024).
- Radios: 20.3 million (1997).
- Television stations:
  - State-run public TV operates 2 national channels supplemented by 16 regional channels and several niche channels; privately owned entities operate several national TV networks and a number of special interest channels; many privately owned channels broadcast locally; roughly half of all households are linked to either satellite or cable TV systems providing access to foreign television networks (2007);
  - 179 + 256 repeaters (1995).
- Television sets: 13.05 million (1997).

== Telephony ==
- Calling code: +48
- International call prefix: 00
- Main lines:
  - 5.3 million lines in use (2022);
  - 6.1 million lines in use (2012);
  - 10.3 million lines in use (2007).
- Mobile cellular:
  - 53.05 million lines (2024)
  - 50.6 million lines (2021);
  - 50.8 million lines (2012);
  - 45.0 million lines (2009).
- Telephone system: modernization of the telecommunications network has accelerated with market-based competition; fixed-line service, dominated by the former state-owned company, is dwarfed by the growth in mobile-cellular services; mobile-cellular service available since 1993 and provided by three nationwide networks with a fourth provider beginning operations in late 2006; coverage is generally good with some gaps in the east; fixed-line service lags in rural areas; international direct dialing with automated exchanges (2011).
- Satellite earth stations: 1 with access to Intelsat, Eutelsat, Inmarsat, and Intersputnik (2011).

The market for fixed-line telephony services and infrastructure was monopolized by the state until 1990. The state monopoly was implemented by the PPTiT which was subordinated to the Ministry of Communications. The telephony segments of that entity were spun-off and incorporated into Telekomunikacja Polska, which was later privatized and sold to Orange Polska. The Telecommunications Act of 1990 allowed the provision of telecommunication infrastructure and services by the former monopoly. After 2000, other operators were allowed to use TP's telecommunications infrastructure under Third-party Access.

From the communist era Poland inherited an underdeveloped and outmoded system of telephones, with some areas (e.g. in the extreme South East) being served by manual exchanges. In December 2005 the last analog exchange was shut down. All telephone lines are now served by modern fully computerized exchanges (Siemens EWSD, Alcatel S12, Lucent 5ESS, Alcatel E10). The former state owned telephone monopoly (TPSA) has been mostly privatized, with France Telecom buying the largest share. Various other companies have entered the fixed phone market, but generally aiming for niches (e.g. Sferia with fixed wireless, Netia covering primarily business). Whilst prices have reduced and availability has increased considerably since the introduction of competition, there is little sign of TPSA's market share being seriously reduced.

There are three competing networks with similar market share, T-Mobile (T-Mobile and Heyah brands), Orange Polska (Orange and nju brands) and Plus (Plus and plush brands). The fourth network, Play, started offering UMTS network services in early 2007.

As of 2022, all mobile operators run nationwide LTE . Play, Plus, and Orange have nationwide UMTS coverage. Plus also offers full 5G coverage in most cities on 2.6 GHz

The auction for the 5G network in the n78 band has been ended and the commercial launch of the network is expected at the end of 2023

== Internet ==
- Top-level domain: .pl
- Internet users:
  - 35.75 million users; 88.1% of the population (2024)
  - 31.97 million users; 84.5% of the population (2021)
  - 25.0 million users, 21st in the world; 65.0% of the population, 54th in the world (2012);
  - 22.5 million users, 19th in the world (2009);
  - 16 million users (2007).
- Fixed broadband: 6.4 million subscriptions, 17th in the world; 16.6% of the population, 54th in the world (2012).
- Wireless broadband: 18.9 million subscriptions, 16th in the world; 49.3% of the population, 33rd in the world (2012).
- Internet hosts: 13.3 million hosts, 12th in the world (2012).
- IPv4: 19.4 million addresses allocated, 21st in the world, 0.5% of the world total, 505.9 addresses per 1000 people (2012).
- Internet service providers: 19 ISPs (1999).

== Regulation in Poland ==
Electronic communications in Poland are governed by the Electronic Communications Law (Prawo komunikacji elektronicznej) of 12 July 2024, which entered into force on 10 November 2024, replaced the Telecommunications Law of 16 July 2004 and transposed the European Electronic Communications Code. The sector is regulated by the President of the Office of Electronic Communications (UKE). Telecommunications undertakings must be entered in a register kept by UKE, which has three working days to make the entry after a complete application, and must report annually by 31 March. The law also applies to number-independent interpersonal communications services such as e-mail, messaging and online meeting services, which are not required to register.

Consumer contracts may be concluded for a fixed term of no more than 24 months, and providers must also offer a term of no more than 12 months. A complaint that is not answered within 30 days is deemed accepted. Telecommunications undertakings must retain specified traffic and location data for 12 months. UKE may impose fines of up to 3% of the previous year's revenue, and managers of an undertaking may be fined up to 300% of their monthly remuneration.

== See also ==
- Polskie Radio, Poland's national publicly funded radio broadcasting organization.
- Radio stations in interwar Poland
- List of Polish-language radio stations
- CERT Polska, Computer Emergency Response Team for Poland.
- Media in Poland
