= Zygmunt Solorz =

Polish businessman (born 1956)

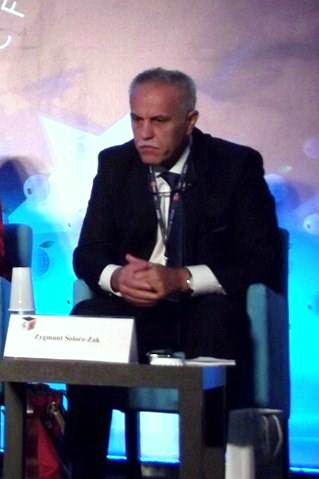
- Solorz in 2013
- Born: August 4, 1956 (age 69); Radom
- Citizenship: Poland
- Occupation: entrepreneur
- Known for: founder of Polsat
- Spouse: Justyna Kulka
- Children: 3

Zygmunt Solorz (Polish: [ˈzɨɡ.munt ˈsɔ.lɔʂ]; born Zygmunt Józef Krok, August 4, 1956 in Radom) is a Polish businessman and a media tycoon known for launching Polsat, one of the largest private television channels in the country. As of 2024, he is the fifth richest person in Poland and has repeatedly appeared on Forbes' ranking of the world's billionaires, with an estimated net worth around €5.77 billion. He ranked #688 on the Forbes 2016 with a net worth of US$2.5 billion. The companies controlled by him include Cyfrowy Polsat, Polkomtel, Netia, Elektrim and Interia.

== Biography ==
=== Early life ===
According to the media, Zygmunt Solorz was born in Radom, a city to the south of Warsaw, and originally had the surname Krok. In 1977 he escaped the Polish People's Republic while on a holiday trip and settled in Munich, in the then West Germany. In the 1980s, he took the surname Solorz after his first wife for feminist reasons. Several years later, after the second marriage, he added the hyphen and became Solorz-Żak. He currently uses just Solorz as his only surname.

In his early twenties, he managed to escape closed-off Poland and got to Germany, where he founded a transport company.

=== Businesses ===
His first major investment on the Polish media market was purchasing the majority stake in the Kurier Polski daily newspaper in early 1992. The same year, Solorz launched the free-to-air commercial TV channel Polsat, broadcast through satellite, and obtained a national commercial television license in 1993. Since the middle of the 1990s, Polsat has remained one of Poland's biggest television stations. His key assets also include the pay TV platform Cyfrowy Polsat.

He holds controlling stakes in the pension fund PTE Polsat, small life insurer Polisa and retail bank Invest Bank. After winning control over the distressed Elektrim conglomerate, Solorz obtained operating control over the lignite power plant PAK, ranked among the three largest electricity producers in Poland. He has owned the Śląsk Wrocław football club since 2008 and the Polish mobile phone company Polkomtel since 2011.

At the turn of the millennium, he owned three television channels in the Baltic states, TV1 in Estonia, LNT in Latvia and BTV in Lithuania.

In 2017, his Cyfrowy Polsat acquired telecommunications company Netia, which owns the second-largest fixed-line cable television and broadband network in Poland.

In 2019, ZE PAK Capital Group, a company controlled by Solorz, initiated a collaboration with the Korean company KHNP concerning the potential construction of small modular reactors on the site of the Pątnów Power Station. He also established the Czysta Polska Foundation, which is concerned with the promotion of ecology and environmental protection. The same year, Cyfrowy Polsat became a shareholder in Poland's biggest IT company Asseco while in 2020, the group bought the web portal Interia.

== Controversy ==
=== Allegations of collaboration with SB ===
In a statement sent to the Polish Press Agency in 2006, Solorz admitted that in 1983 he signed a commitment to collaborate with the 1st Department of the Ministry of Internal Affairs. He was registered as an agent of the Communist-era Security Service (Polish: Służba Bezpieczeństwa, SB) from 18 October 1983 to 26 June 1985 under the alias TW Zeg. According to Solorz, he was blackmailed by the Security Service and made this decision in order to avoid getting arrested for his illegal stay in Germany. He further added that he didn't take any active role in this collaboration and as a result didn't harm anybody. The Security Service delisted him from its registry after 1.5 years describing him as "useless".

=== Intrafamilial conflict ===
In October 2024, Solorz removed his two sons, Tobias Solorz and Piotr Żak, from the supervisory board of the power producer ZE PAK. In October, the shareholders of Cyfrowy Polsat also backed the company's founder and voted to dismiss Tobias Solorz and lawyer Jarosław Grzesiak from the company's supervisory board.

The conflict between Solorz and his children concerns the succession to his conglomerate. According to Paweł Rymarz, the lawyer representing Solorz's children Tobias, Piotr and Agnieszka, the succession had already been completed. On 2 August 2024, Solorz allegedly signed a notarial declaration granting them a joint control over the TiVi Foundation and Solkomtel. However, one day after the signing of this document Solorz reportedly changed his mind and decided to withdraw from that decision. His children claim that his current wife, Justyna Kulka, is behind this and accuse her of exerting excessive influence over their father's decisions.

== Personal life ==
In 1983, he married Ilona Solorz, a Polish expatriate living in Germany who originally came from Silesia. He has a son Tobias with her. The couple divorced in 1991. From 1992 to 2014, his second wife was Małogrzata Żak with whom he has son Piotr and daughter Aleksandra. In 2022, he divorced his third wife, Małgorzata Nawrocka. In 2024, he married his fourth wife Justyna Kulka.

== See also ==
- Michał Sołowow
- Jan Kulczyk
- Economy of Poland
