= Disney+ =

American video streaming service

- Logo used since 2024

- Screenshot Disney+ U.S. homepage screenshot on March 27, 2024, including Shōgun as its featured media.
- Website type: OTT streaming platform
- Available in: 58 languages
- List of languages: Arabic; Chinese (Simplified and Traditional); Croatian; Czech; Danish; Dutch; English; Finnish; French; German; Greek; Hebrew; Hungarian; Indonesian; Italian; Japanese; Korean; Malay; Norwegian (Bokmål); Polish; Portuguese; Romanian; Slovak; Spanish; Swedish; Thai; Turkish
- Predecessors: DisneyLife (Ireland and United Kingdom); Disney Deluxe (Japan); Disney+ Hotstar (Indonesia, Malaysia, and Thailand)
- Headquarters: Los Angeles, California, U.S.
- Country of origin: United States
- Area served: Canada, Europe, Latin America and the Caribbean, Middle East and North Africa, South Africa, United States, and parts of the Asia-Pacific (see full list of countries)
- Key people: Adam Smith (Chairman, Direct-to-Consumer, Disney Entertainment)
- Parent: Disney Streaming
- Website: disneyplus.com
- Registration: Monthly/yearly subscription required to access content
- Users: ▲131.6 million (as of November 13, 2025)
- Launched: November 12, 2019; 7 years ago
- Current status: Active

Disney+ is an American subscription video on-demand over-the-top streaming media service owned by the Walt Disney Company and operated through the direct-to-consumer business of Disney Entertainment. The service primarily distributes films and television series produced by Walt Disney Studios and Disney Television Studios, featuring dedicated content hubs for Disney's flagship brands, including Disney, Pixar, Marvel, Star Wars, National Geographic, Hulu (Note: Introduced in the United States on December 6, 2023, in beta, with its full launch on March 27, 2024. Expanded internationally on October 8, 2025, replacing Star, except in Japan.) and ESPN in select regions. Disney+ also offers original and exclusive films and television programming.

Disney+ relies on technology developed by Disney Streaming, formerly known as BAMTech, which was established in 2015 as a spin-off of MLB Advanced Media (MLBAM), the digital media arm of Major League Baseball. Disney acquired a controlling stake in BAMTech in 2017 and subsequently placed it under Walt Disney Direct-to-Consumer & International as part of a corporate restructuring ahead of its acquisition of 21st Century Fox. Development of Disney+ drew on BAMTech's technology, which also powered ESPN+ following its launch in 2018. Production of original films and television series for Disney+ began in late 2017, ahead of the expiration of Disney's streaming distribution agreement with Netflix in 2019.

Following the acquisition of 21st Century Fox, Disney introduced Star as a general entertainment hub within Disney+ in February 2021 and launched the standalone Star+ service in Latin America that August. Star+ was discontinued in 2024, with its content incorporated into Disney+, while the Star hub was replaced internationally by Hulu in October 2025, except in Japan.

Disney+ launched on November 12, 2019, in the United States, Canada and the Netherlands, followed by Australia, New Zealand and Puerto Rico later that month. The service expanded to several European countries in March 2020 and to India in April through Star India's Hotstar platform, which was rebranded as Disney+ Hotstar. Additional European markets received Disney+ in September 2020, followed by Latin America in November. Its international expansion continued into Southeast Asia beginning in 2021, followed by Northern and Eastern Europe, the Middle East and parts of Africa in 2022. In February 2025, Disney+ Hotstar in India merged with JioCinema to form JioHotstar, which subsequently expanded to additional international markets. The Disney+ Hotstar brand was fully phased out in October 2025, when its remaining Southeast Asian services were rebranded as Disney+.

Upon its launch, Disney+ received positive reviews for its content library but faced criticism over technical issues, missing titles and alterations to certain films and television series. Disney reported more than 10 million sign-ups within the first day of operation. (Note: This figure may include discounted pre-orders offered in August and September 2019.) As of September 2025, Disney+ had 131.6 million paid subscribers worldwide.

== History ==
=== 2015–2019 ===
In late 2015, Disney launched a streaming service in the United Kingdom called DisneyLife to test the streaming market. It was later launched in the Philippines on May 25, 2018. The UK version was replaced by Disney+ on March 24, 2020, while discontinued in the Philippines on April 1 that year.

In August 2016, Disney acquired a minority stake in BAMTech (a spin-off of MLB Advanced Media's streaming technology business) for $1 billion, with an option to acquire a majority stake in the future. Following the purchase, ESPN announced plans for an "exploratory [over-the-top] project" based on its technology (ESPN+) to supplant its existing linear television services. On August 8, 2017, Disney invoked its option to acquire a controlling stake in BAMTech for $1.58 billion, increasing its stake to 75%. Alongside the acquisition, the company also announced plans for a second, Disney-branded direct-to-consumer service drawing from its entertainment content, which would launch after the company ends its existing distribution agreement with Netflix in 2019. Not long after, Agnes Chu, story and franchise development executive at Walt Disney Imagineering, was the first executive appointed for the unit, as senior vice president of content. Chu led two projects to launch the new unit. First, Disney needed to verify exactly what content could be physically and legally made available through a streaming service right away, which meant physically reviewing all content in Disney's vaults that had not recently undergone restoration, and reviewing "binders of pieces of paper with legal deals" to identify potential obstacles. Second, Chu met with leaders of Disney's various content-producing divisions to start brainstorming which projects would be appropriate for release on a streaming service rather than in movie theaters. Chu later left in August 2020.

In December 2017, Disney announced its intent to acquire key entertainment assets from 21st Century Fox. Intended to bolster Disney's content portfolio for its streaming products, the acquisition was completed on March 20, 2019.

In January 2018, it was reported that former Apple and Samsung executive Kevin Swint had been appointed the senior vice president and general manager, reporting to BAMTech CEO Michael Paull, who leads development. In March 2018, Disney's top level segment division was reorganized with the formation of Disney Direct-to-Consumer and International, which then included BAMTech, which contains "all consumer-facing tech and products". In June of the same year, longtime Disney studio marketing chief, Ricky Strauss, was named president of content and marketing, however reporting to chairman of Disney Direct-to-Consumer and International Kevin Mayer. In January 2019, Fox Television Group COO Joe Earley was named executive vice president of marketing and operations. In June 2019, Matt Brodlie was named as senior vice president of international content development. In August 2019, Luke Bradley-Jones was hired as senior vice president of direct to consumer and general manager of Disney+ for Europe and Africa.

On November 8, 2018, Disney CEO Bob Iger announced that the service would be named Disney+ and that the company was targeting a launch in late 2019. A September launch was reportedly planned, but on April 11, 2019, Disney announced that Disney+ would launch on November 12, 2019, in the United States. Disney stated that it planned to roll the service out worldwide over the next two years, targeting Western Europe and Asia-Pacific countries by late 2019 and early 2020, and Eastern Europe and Latin America during 2020. The timing of international launches is subject to the acquisition or expiration of existing streaming rights deals for Disney content. On August 6, 2019, Iger announced that it would offer a streaming bundle of Disney+, ESPN+ and the ad-supported version of Hulu for $12.99 per month available at launch. At the D23 Expo in August 2019, Disney opened subscriptions to Disney+ at a discounted rate for three years.

On September 12, 2019, a trial version of Disney+ became available in the Netherlands with limited content available. This testing phase lasted until the official launch on November 12, when trial users were switched to a paid plan. Disney+ became available for pre-order in September in the United States with a 7-day free trial upon launch.

The original blue-colored Disney+ logo, used from 2019 to 2024

In October 2019, Disney released a video that ran for three hours and eighteen minutes on YouTube to showcase their launch lineup. It was also reported that Disney would ban advertisements for competitor Netflix from most of its TV platforms, except ESPN.

Disney+ launched on November 12, 2019, Midnight Pacific Time in the three initial launch countries. The services had some issues the first day with logging in (about 33% of the problems), accessing specific content (about 66%), setting up profiles and watch lists. Some of the issues were due to third-party devices.

On November 18, 2019, an investigation by ZDNet discovered that thousands of users' accounts were hacked using keystroke logging or info-stealing malware. Their email addresses and passwords were changed, "effectively taking over the account and locking the previous owner out", and their login information was put up for sale on the dark web.

=== 2020s ===
On March 12, 2020, Vanessa Morrison, who previously served as President of Fox Family and 20th Century Animation, was appointed President of Streaming for Walt Disney Studios Motion Picture Production and currently oversees the development and production of Disney+ film content from the Walt Disney Studios for both Disney Live Action and 20th Century Studios. Morrison reports directly to President of Walt Disney Pictures Sean Bailey.

On October 12, 2020, Disney announced a reorganization of their media business with a greater focus on streaming. They are planning to add more content for Disney+ and their other streaming platforms (such as Hulu) in the future.

On December 10, 2020, Disney announced that a year after the launch of Disney+, it had over 86.8 million subscribers. It was later announced that as of January 2, 2021, the platform had over 94.9 million subscribers. In January of the same year, Ricky Strauss, who led the service's content curation and marketing efforts, left the company.

In March 2021, Disney announced an increase to the streaming service's pricing that would take place on March 26, 2021. In the second quarter of 2021, Disney+ added 8.7 million subscribers.

In August 2021, Disney CEO Bob Chapek suggested that, eventually, Disney+ could be merged with Hulu (as in other markets), citing that the bundled approach had less subscriber churn than the individual services alone, but that "there may also be certain constraints that we're under that could at least, from a short-term standpoint, limit our ability to do what long term we might feel was ideal, but frankly we don't know what's ideal yet."

On March 4, 2022, Disney announced they will plan to launch a low-cost ad-supported version of Disney+ by late 2022 in the United States, with that version also expanding to other international territories in 2023. Disney later announced on August 10, 2022, that the ad-supported version of Disney+ launches on December 8, with more than 100 advertisers. Costing US$7.99 per month, with the ad free version of Disney+ receiving a price hike of US$3.

In May 2022, the company reported it gained 7.9 million subscribers over the first three months of 2022. In August 2022, it was announced that the combined total of subscribers across all Disney streaming platforms including Disney+, Hulu and ESPN+ had surpassed Netflix with roughly 221 million.

In January 2023, Disney+ received its first Academy Award nomination, for the Italian film Le pupille in the Best Live Action Short Film category. In February 2023, Disney reported a total of 161.8 million Disney+ subscribers worldwide at the end of 2022, with a gain of 200,000 in Canada and the United States, but a net loss of 2.4 million worldwide attributed to the loss of streaming rights to Indian Premier League cricket in India.

On May 18, 2023, it was announced that Disney+ and Hulu would remove nearly 60 original films and series on May 26 to "cut costs". The news sparked some backlash, mostly towards the initial decision to remove Howard, the documentary on the life of songwriter Howard Ashman, on the eve of Pride Month and the release of the live-action adaptation of The Little Mermaid. However, it was confirmed the next day that the film will remain available on the service. On July 1, more original films and series were removed globally, including Crater, which was released seven weeks prior. However, on September 26, 2023, it was revealed that six of the removed original films: Crater, Better Nate Than Ever, Flora & Ulysses, The One And Only Ivan, Timmy Failure: Mistakes Were Made and the 2022 remake of Cheaper by the Dozen were released for purchase on multiple digital platforms including Amazon Prime Video, iTunes, Vudu, and Google Play, a move that some considered as historic and unconventional for a streaming service.

Following a carriage agreement with Spectrum in September 2023, Disney+ became available to Spectrum TV Select subscribers for no extra cost.

The ad-tier version was later launched in Canada and parts of Europe by November 1, 2023.

On December 6, 2023, Disney added a Hulu content hub to Disney+ as a beta for U.S. Disney Bundle subscribers, in a similar manner to the Star content hub used internationally. In March 2024, Disney+ debuted an updated teal logo design, which Jess Weatherbed at The Verge believed was preparation for the service's integration with Hulu. The new animated logo for the streamer to serve as its splash screen and to open original series and films was also revealed that same month, with a short orchestral theme composed by Ludwig Göransson. The interface was also updated to match the new teal color scheme, which was dubbed "Aurora" as an homage to Princess Aurora from Sleeping Beauty (1959).

On March 27, 2024, the Hulu content hub officially exited beta. On June 26, 2024, content from the separate Star+ service began to be integrated into Disney+ in Latin America, ahead of its discontinuation the following month. On July 25, 2024, Disney announced a partnership with Warner Bros. Discovery to offer Disney+, Hulu and Max as a bundle in the United States.

After a woman died in a Disney Springs restaurant, Disney argued that if a user signs up for a Disney+ subscription or a free trial, the user permanently relinquishes their right to a jury trial in any disputes with the company.

On October 22, 2024, following a similar move by Netflix and Spotify, Disney discontinued support for billing Disney+ and Hulu subscriptions via the App Store on iOS platforms, citing Apple's revenue sharing rules for in-app purchases.

In August 2025, Disney announced plans to fully merge Hulu into an updated version of the Disney+ platform in 2026, although the two services would remain separate subscriptions. In addition, it was announced that Hulu would replace Star as its general entertainment brand for international markets; the rebranding took effect on October 8, 2025, which was accompanied by an update to the Disney+ user interface with a focus on recommendations and more visual content. However, in May 2026, Disney announced that there were no plans to shut down the separate Hulu app.

In late March 2026, Disney+ announced plans to launch an advertisement-supported subscription tier for their Australian and New Zealand markets.

== Content ==
Disney+ original logo used since 2024

The service is built around content from Disney's main entertainment studios and film and television library, including Walt Disney Pictures, Walt Disney Animation Studios, Disneynature, Disneytoon Studios, Pixar, Marvel Studios, Lucasfilm, National Geographic, 20th Century Studios, Searchlight Pictures, Touchstone Pictures, 20th Century Animation, the former Saban Entertainment, Blue Sky Studios and Hollywood Pictures. The service operates alongside Hulu, which Disney gained a controlling stake in following the 21st Century Fox purchase. Bob Iger stated that at launch, Disney+ would focus on family-oriented entertainment (not carrying any content rated R, NC-17 or TV-MA) and that Hulu would continue to host general entertainment; Hulu also hosts Disney+ as an add-on service. Content intended for mature audiences (R and TV-MA) was later added to the service, including the Disney+ original The Beatles: Get Back (2021), which includes a content warning, and the Marvel series produced for Netflix, all of which are rated TV-MA. With the addition of the Marvel Netflix series in March 2022, revised parental controls were introduced to the service in the United States to allow the more mature content of the series to be added, similarly to the controls that already exist for other regions that have the Star content hub. On December 6, 2023, Disney launched a content hub for Disney+ similar to that of Star, which contains Hulu content for Disney Bundle subscribers in the United States in beta.

=== Content library ===
It is suggested that Disney+ had approximately 7,000 television episodes and 500 films at launch, including original television series and films from Disney Channel, National Geographic and Freeform, as well as select titles from 20th Television, 20th Television Animation, and ABC Signature. New releases from 20th Century Studios would not immediately be available on either Disney+ or Hulu at the start, as the studio had pre-existing output deals with other premium television and streaming providers (including HBO in the United States until 2022, Crave in Canada and Sky in the United Kingdom, Ireland, Italy and Germany). Captain Marvel, Dumbo (2019) and Avengers: Endgame became the first theatrically released Disney films to stream exclusively on Disney+ within the pay-cable window.

It was announced that Disney+ would add the first 30 seasons of The Simpsons to the service at launch, (Note: "Stark Raving Dad" (1991) is the only Simpsons episode unavailable on Disney+; the episode was pulled from general circulation in March 2019 following renewed sexual abuse allegations against guest star Michael Jackson.) as the series' new exclusive home, with season 31 being added on October 2, 2020, season 32 being added on September 29, 2021, and season 33 being added on October 5, 2022, in the United States. Season 34 was added to the service on October 11, 2023.

Iger said that Disney+ will eventually host the entire Disney film library, including all of the films that are currently in the "Disney Vault". However, he stated that the controversial Song of the South (1946), which has never been released on home video in its entirety in the United States, will never be released on the service. Walt Disney Animation Studios' 1946 film Make Mine Music is not available on the service, possibly due to a gunfight scene, making it the only film in the Disney animated canon not to be included. Despite being available at launch, at least five films—Home Alone, Home Alone 2: Lost in New York, Pirates of the Caribbean: On Stranger Tides, Ice Age, and Garfield: A Tail of Two Kitties—had been temporarily removed from the service in the United States. (Note: The Home Alone films were restored in November 2020, after fulfilling a contract with HBO.)

It was initially unclear whether the first six films of the Star Wars franchise would be available in the United States at the service's launch, as TBS held streaming rights through 2024 as part of its cable rights to the franchise, but in April 2019, it was announced that the films would be available at launch along with The Force Awakens (Note: The rights to The Force Awakens (among various other Disney films) are owned by the premium television network Starz (as they have previously been the first-run pay-TV provider for Walt Disney Studios' releases between 1994 and 2015). To sub-license the streaming rights, it was reported that Disney had agreed to provide an advertising placement for Starz at the conclusion of the registration process for Disney+ and ESPN+ on PC and Android platforms, although no further promotions from Starz are seen once sign-up is completed.) and Rogue One, with The Last Jedi being added on December 26, 2019, The Rise of Skywalker being added on May 4, 2020, and Solo: A Star Wars Story being added on July 10, 2020. On April 2, 2021, several older Star Wars spin-offs were released.

In the United States, most of the films from the Marvel Cinematic Universe were available at launch, with the exception of seven films: Thor: Ragnarok (added on December 5, 2019), Black Panther (added on March 4, 2020), Avengers: Infinity War (added on June 25, 2020) and Ant-Man and the Wasp (added on August 14, 2020), due to existing licensing deals with Netflix; and The Incredible Hulk, Spider-Man: Homecoming, and Spider-Man: Far From Home, which were initially unavailable because their distribution rights were initially owned by Universal Pictures (The Incredible Hulk) and Sony Pictures through the Columbia Pictures division (Spider-Man). On June 16, 2023, The Incredible Hulk was added to Disney+ after the rights to the film reverted to Marvel Studios and Disney from Universal.

Some films and series were modified by Disney: a post-credits scene from Toy Story 2 was edited out; nudity was eliminated from Splash by adding digital hair, blurring and cropping certain scenes, although the original uncensored theatrical version was restored to the service in 4K in November 2022; (Note: Similarly, minor cleavage was blurred in Wizards of Waverly Place.) films such as Adventures in Babysitting, Free Solo, and Hamilton are altered to remove profanities; (Note: Taboo words like "fuck" and "goddamn" were censored from Adventures in Babysitting and Free Solo; however, Hamilton retained one instance of "fuck" as is typically allowed in a PG-13 film.) The Adventures of Bullwhip Griffin (1967) was edited to remove racial slurs, and the short film Santa's Workshop (1932) was edited to remove a "stereotypical black doll". Some older content, such as films, animated shorts and series, have a content disclaimer on the platform noting the possibility of outdated cultural depictions. (Note: An additional notice is displayed for titles containing depictions of tobacco.) Starting in October 2020, a 12-second content disclaimer informing viewers of racially insensitive scenes plays before some older Disney films—including Peter Pan, Dumbo, Swiss Family Robinson, Lady and the Tramp, The Jungle Book, Aladdin (alongside the two direct-to-video sequels), and The Aristocats. Additionally, by January 2021, some of these films were no longer viewable on kids profiles; the titles were still available to view on regular profiles. X-Men: Days of Future Past, which was released by 20th Century Fox on May 23, 2014, contains both nudity and the word "fuck", began airing uncensored in mid-2020. Some series are missing episodes, including Darkwing Duck, The Little Mermaid, The Proud Family, Phineas and Ferb, Spider-Man and His Amazing Friends, (Note: One episode featuring Nazi imagery and Nazi agent Red Skull was omitted. Additionally, the series' third episode features a warning about racially insensitive content regarding stereotypes of Asians.) The Muppet Show, (Note: All but two The Muppet Show episodes were added on February 19, 2021. Other episodes have been edited, mostly due to music rights issues—with some segments removed, and others restored after being absent from earlier DVD releases.) and The Simpsons, among other programs. (Note: Additionally, the first few episodes of Gravity Falls had the symbol on Grunkle Stan's fez removed.) All episodes featuring Stoney Westmoreland on Andi Mack are banned from the service. This comes after Westmoreland had tried to arrange a sexual encounter with a minor in 2018, which led to his conviction.

On November 22, 2021, Disney and WarnerMedia reached a deal to amend the pre-existing deal HBO had with 21st Century Fox to allow Disney+ or Hulu and HBO Max to share the streaming rights to half of 20th Century Studios' and Searchlight Pictures' 2022 theatrical slate in the United States during the pay-one window, with Ron's Gone Wrong being the first film under the deal, becoming available on both Disney+ and HBO Max on December 15, 2021. Disney still has full streaming rights to any 20th Century and Searchlight films produced for Disney+ or Hulu, while the Disney deal with WarnerMedia for streaming 20th Century and Searchlight films on HBO Max ended in 2022, with Disney+ and Hulu assuming the full pay-one rights to films released after 2022.

On September 3, 2024, ABC News Live was added to Disney+ as a continuous playlist, alongside a continuous Disney+ Playtime preschool playlist.

=== Original scripted content ===
The service's initial original content goal was planned to include four to five original films and five television shows with budgets from $25–100 million. In January 2019, it was reported that Disney would spend up to $500 million in original content for the service. (Note: The Mandalorian alone was expected to cost about $10 million an episode.) Original series based on Star Wars and Marvel properties have been or are being produced. Original Star Wars series include The Mandalorian and its spin-offs The Book of Boba Fett and Ahsoka, a seventh season of the animated The Clone Wars (and a spin-off series titled The Bad Batch), as well as Obi-Wan Kenobi, Andor, Skeleton Crew, The Acolyte and Lando. Original Marvel series include WandaVision and its spin-offs Agatha All Along and VisionQuest, The Falcon and the Winter Soldier, Loki, Hawkeye and its spin-off Echo, Moon Knight, Ms. Marvel, She-Hulk: Attorney at Law, Secret Invasion, Daredevil: Born Again, Ironheart and Wonder Man. Animated Marvel series include What If..?, I Am Groot, X-Men '97, Your Friendly Neighborhood Spider-Man, Eyes of Wakanda, and Marvel Zombies.

In January 2019, Disney+ ordered Diary of a Future President from CBS Television Studios, its first series from an outside production company.

A television series remake of the film High Fidelity was initially announced for Disney+, but in April 2019, it was announced that the project had been moved to Hulu, citing concerns from its staff that the positioning of Disney+ as a family-friendly service was at odds with their creative vision for the series. Love, Victor, a spin-off of the film Love, Simon, was similarly shifted from Disney+ to Hulu in February 2020.

In August 2019, Iger announced that 20th Century Fox properties such as Home Alone, Night at the Museum, Diary of a Wimpy Kid and Cheaper by the Dozen will be "'reimagined' for 'a new generation'" exclusively for Disney+ by Fox Family.

Most original episodic content is released weekly, as opposed to all at once with the release time initially being 12:01 am. PT on Fridays, which lasted from November 15, 2019, to June 25, 2021. With the premiere of Loki, which debuted on June 9, 2021, Disney shifted the release schedule for new original series and new seasons of the respective series to Wednesdays.

On December 25, 2020, Soul became the first feature-length film from Pixar to be released as a Disney+ original. The following two Pixar films, Luca and Turning Red, were also released as Disney+ originals.

On February 1, 2022, Disney announced that Star Original Korean drama series Snowdrop would be released on Disney+ in the U.S. on February 9, 2022, as a Disney+ original; this marks the series becoming the first international content for Disney+ and the first content as both a Disney+ and Star original.

=== Original unscripted content ===
Disney also plans original factual television content for the service, aiming to "find the ethos of Disney in everyday stories, inspiring hope and sparking the curiosity of audiences of all ages." Some of these series will have ties to Disney properties, including behind-the-scenes documentary miniseries focusing on Disney studios (such as one following the production of Frozen II), the Disney-themed competition cooking competition Be Our Chef, Cinema Relics (a documentary series showcasing iconic costume and props from Disney films), Marvel's Hero Project (a series showcasing "inspiring kids [that] have dedicated their lives to selfless acts of bravery and kindness") and The Imagineering Story (a Leslie Iwerks-directed documentary series chronicling the history and work of Walt Disney Imagineering). National Geographic also produced Magic of the Animal Kingdom (a docuseries following the animal caretakers of Disney's Animal Kingdom and Epcot's aquarium) and The World According to Jeff Goldblum.

Disney reached a two-year pact with the documentary studio Supper Club (Brian McGinn, David Gelb and Jason Sterman, producers of Netflix's Chef's Table) to produce content for the service, including the conservation-themed nature documentary series Earthkeepers, and Marvel's 616, a documentary series chronicling the cultural and societal impact of Marvel's characters. Other factual series include Encore! (a Kristen Bell-produced series that reunites casts from high school musical productions to reprise their roles) and Rogue Trip (a travel series featuring Bob Woodruff and his son Mack) and the reality competition Shop Class.

On April 8, 2022, it was announced that Dancing with the Stars would be moving from ABC to Disney+ in North America, beginning with season 31; in 2023. Disney reversed the change and announced that season 32 would air live in simulcast on both Disney+ and ABC.

=== Sports ===
In 2023, Disney+ began to be involved in alternate broadcasts of ESPN-televised sporting events in the United States, featuring real-time 3D animations of players represented by characters from Disney properties. The first of these were Big City Greens-themed broadcasts of NHL games on March 13, 2023, and March 9, 2024, both of which also simulcast with ESPN+, Disney Channel, and Disney XD. In October 2023, Disney+ simulcast a similar Toy Story-themed broadcast of an NFL game from London, England, and in 2024 aired an NBA Christmas Day game featuring Disney characters.

On February 26, 2023, Disney+ in Japan live streamed Gift, an ice show at the Tokyo Dome produced and performed by two-time Olympic champion Yuzuru Hanyu. A "remastered" presentation of the show was later released on Disney+ worldwide on July 14, 2023.

On April 16, 2024, it was announced that Disney+ in Denmark and Sweden would air live UEFA Europa League and UEFA Conference League matches from the 2024–25 to 2026–27 seasons. In May 2025, Disney+ announced an agreement to broadcast UEFA Women's Champions League matches throughout Europe starting with the 2025–26 season. In August 2025, Disney+ announced an agreement to broadcast La Liga matches in the United Kingdom and Ireland.

On June 26, 2024, with the closedown of the separate Star+ service, ESPN Latin America began to be integrated into Disney+ in Latin America and the Caribbean. In November 2025, it was announced that the NBA games would be available to stream on Disney+ Philippines.

In November 2024, it was announced that an ESPN hub would be added to Disney+ in the United States on December 4; the ESPN hub would include sports broadcasts and original series that are made available to Disney+ and Hulu subscribers, as well as integrate content from ESPN+ for users subscribed to that service. The ESPN hub would also integrate with ESPN's then-upcoming over-the-top service upon its launch in August 2025.

The 2025 edition of the KeSPA Cup League of Legends tournament was exclusive to Disney+, initially in just select Asia-Pacific regions. Prior to the tournament's playoffs, the tournament became available on Disney+ in the United States.

On April 7, 2026, the ESPN hub launched internationally on Disney+ in 57 markets, predominantly in Europe and the Asia-Pacific, incorporating acquired properties and those to which ESPN holds the global rights. In July and August 2026, Disney+ announced a four-season agreement to televise La Liga in Denmark, Finland, Iceland, and Sweden, and a three-season agreement in France (splitting with DAZN).

On August 11, 2026, it was announced that Disney had acquired the global streaming rights to Formula E, with the circuit streaming on ESPN+ in the United States and Disney+ internationally. In some territories, this contract is non-exclusive and may co-exist with Formula E's existing television deals (such as its agreement with ITV Sport in the United Kingdom).

On October 7, 2026, Disney announced that it would simulcast ABC's coverage of Super Bowl LXI on Disney+ in the United States. To lead towards the broadcast, it was announced that the platform will also simulcast two Monday Night Football games, beginning with the October 26, 2026 game; it will mark the first time Disney+ will carry a traditional broadcast of an NFL game in the United States.

=== Simultaneous releases ===
==== Premier Access ====
Premier Access logo

During the COVID-19 pandemic with movie theaters closed or heavily restricted around the world, Disney took the decision to offer certain movies via the Disney+ platform for an extra fee. Branded "Premier Access", an additional fee was charged over the regular subscription. This allowed unlimited views of the film as long as the customer maintained a Disney+ subscription. The films became available to all subscribers after approximately three months. The additional fee per movie was $29.99 in the US, £19.99 in the UK, and €21.99 in the rest of Europe.

The live-action adaptation of Mulan was the first to premiere in select countries on Disney+ with Premier Access on September 4, 2020. A second feature film, Raya and the Last Dragon, was offered through the Premier Access model on March 5, 2021, the same day as its theatrical release. In March 2021, Disney announced that Cruella and Black Widow would be released theatrically and through Premier Access. In May 2021, Disney announced that Jungle Cruise would also be released theatrically and through Premier Access. This proved to be the final release under this model as the post-COVID world reopened.

==== Network releases ====
In September 2021, it was reported that Disney had begun a new television release strategy by giving episodes from certain series an early premiere on Disney+ ahead of their television debuts. The first series to be released through this strategy was The Ghost and Molly McGee, with episodes 3 to 5 being released on Disney+ on October 6, 2021. This was followed by the third and final season of Fancy Nancy premiering in its entirety on Disney+ alongside its premiere episode on Disney Junior on November 12, 2021.

In November 2021, it was reported that the Disney Channel Original Movie, Christmas...Again?! would be released on Disney+ on December 3, 2021, the same day of its television premiere, marking the first film to receive a simultaneous release. A similar approach would be taken with future Disney Channel Original Movies, becoming available on Disney+ the day following their premieres on Disney Channel with movies like Prom Pact and The Naughty Nine. This ultimately lead to Disney Channel Original Movies being rebranded to "Disney Original Movies".

=== Third-party content ===
In addition to Disney's own content, select television programs produced by third-party companies but broadcast on Disney-owned television channels are also featured, such as Ludo Studio's Bluey, supplied though BBC Studios. Content co-produced with Disney's European subsidiaries, such as Zagtoon's Miraculous: Tales of Ladybug & Cat Noir and Ghostforce, Hasbro Entertainment's Kiya & the Kimoja Heroes and PJ Masks; Banijay Kids & Family's The Unstoppable Yellow Yeti and Samka Studios' Vikingskool are also available on Disney+ in several territories worldwide.

In October 2022, Disney+ announced that it had acquired streaming rights, excluding the United Kingdom & Ireland (which remained to be streamed on BBC iPlayer), to the BBC series Doctor Who starting in 2023 with the 60th Anniversary Specials starring David Tennant as the Fourteenth Doctor and Catherine Tate as Donna Noble, and continuing with its upcoming fourteenth series starring Ncuti Gatwa as the Fifteenth Doctor.

On February 7, 2024, Disney+ obtained the streaming rights to the 2023 concert film Taylor Swift: The Eras Tour, for which they will stream an exclusive unabridged edit of the film dubbed "Taylor's Version," with songs not featured in the theatrical and VOD releases, beginning March 15.

As a result of the Hulu acquisition, select titles from DreamWorks Animation and Warner Bros. Discovery, who have a partial deal with Hulu, have also begun to appear on the service, including the 2004 comedy film Shark Tale and the series The Croods: Family Tree, as well as the Cartoon Network series The Amazing World of Gumball and its continuation series, The Wonderfully Weird World of Gumball.

Outside the US, the Twilight films were made available to stream on Disney+ under the Star hub including Australia, New Zealand, Canada, United Kingdom, and other regions, supposedly done via a small content deal with Lionsgate in May 2024. They were later removed from the platform in November 2024.

From the start of 2025, a few Warner Bros. Television shows began appearing on Disney+ outside the U.S. via the Star hub including Gilmore Girls, The Big Bang Theory, and Young Sheldon, implying that Warner Bros. has done a content deal with Disney.

From February 2025, Disney+ began adding a large number of titles to its Star Hub outside of the US and Latin America from Paramount, including some DreamWorks Pictures titles owned by Paramount. This includes major titles and franchises, such as the first six Mission: Impossible films, Mean Girls, Clueless, Grease, and Grease 2 as well as the first six films from the Transformers franchise. Most of these titles were available until July 31, 2025, excluding Transformers which was added on July 16, and Jimmy Neutron: Boy Genius which was added on August 1.

During July 2025, Disney+ added all seasons of The Office US from Universal Television to its Star content hub outside the US and Latin America.

==== Multi-year deal with Sony Pictures ====
In April 2021, Disney and Sony Pictures reached a multi-year deal to let Sony's titles (such as films from the Spider-Man and Jumanji franchises, individual tiles like Stuart Little, and anime licensed by Funimation/Crunchyroll like Attack on Titan and Fate/stay night: Unlimited Blade Works) stream on Hulu and Disney+. A significant number of Sony titles began streaming on Hulu starting in June 2021. It includes films from 2022 onwards. While the deal only concerns the United States, titles from Sony Pictures begun to also be added to Disney+ in regions outside of the U.S., as early as June 2022, starting with the majority of the Spider-Man films. This also included the animated Spider-Man: Into the Spider-Verse. All three Sam Raimi-directed Spider-Man films and The Amazing Spider-Man would eventually be made available on the American version of the platform on April 21, 2023, with Spider-Man: Homecoming and Venom, a film in Sony's Spider-Man Universe, being made available the following month. Spider-Man: Far From Home was added on November 3, 2023, and Spider-Man: Across the Spider-Verse was added to the service on May 1, 2025.

==== European deals ====
In European territories, Disney+ contains several locally produced content to fulfill certain countries' local content criteria.

In November 2021, Disney announced that StudioCanal's Paddington films would be released on Disney+ in the United Kingdom and Ireland, with the films also arriving on Germany and France eventually. Several other StudioCanal movies such as Maya the Bee are also available on the service.

Films from Pathé such as Asterix and Obelix vs. Caesar and Chicken Run are also available on Disney+ in select European territories.

Hasbro Entertainment's Peppa Pig is also available on the service in many EMEA regions, first made available in March 2023.

On 10 July 2025, the Walt Disney Company and ITV plc announced that they would agree to share programming on Disney+ and ITVX, under slots entitled "Taste of ITVX" and "Taste of Disney+". ITV programmes being added to Disney+ would include Endeavour and The 1% Club, while Disney programmes being added to ITVX would include Andor and Lilo and Stitch: The Series.

==== Brazilian deals ====
Disney+ also has multiple third-party deals with Brazilian TV networks. Both SBT and Disney+ broadcast The Voice Brasil for the 13th season, and the national awards program Troféu Imprensa. Disney+ also has a deal with Record, where it both broadcasts the Brazilian reality show Casa do Patrão.

== Device support and service features ==
Disney+ is available for streaming via web browsers on Windows, macOS, and Linux, as well as apps on iOS and Apple TV, Android and Android TV, Fire TV and Fire HD, Chromecast and ChromeOS devices, Samsung Smart TVs, LG webOS TVs, Vizio SmartCast TVs, Roku devices, Xfinity Flex, Sky Q, Now TV devices, Foxtel devices, PlayStation 4, PlayStation 5, Xbox One, Xbox Series X/S, Windows 10 and Windows 11. Content available on Disney+ is also listed in the Apple TV and Google TV apps.

Accessibility features include closed captioning, audio description (also known as described video) and audio navigation assistance.

Disney+ allows seven user profiles per account, with the ability to stream on four devices concurrently and unlimited downloads for offline viewing. Content is able to be streamed in resolutions up to 4K Ultra HD in Dolby Vision and HDR10, with Dolby Atmos sound on supported devices. Legacy content and Disney+ originals are available in multiple languages. As of March 2026, the Disney+ app and website is translated in 21 languages, while the service offers subtitles and dubbing in over 40 languages globally.

In late May 2020, the service added the ability to switch between 4:3 and 16:9 aspect ratios for early Simpsons episodes, after the service received backlash for cropping episodes to 16:9 by default at launch. Disney had done this "in order to guarantee visual quality and consistency across all 30 seasons." To accommodate the feature, Disney Streaming Services "had to reconfigure its content-delivery engine" while ensuring the new feature would not break any existing features such as continue watching, watchlists and auto-playing, as they did not want to treat the 4:3 versions as bonus content. The resulting changes allowed Disney to apply the existing audio, subtitle information, episode artwork and other metadata from the episodes to both aspect ratios regardless of which is chosen by the user. Joe Rice, vice president of media product at Disney Streaming Services, added that these adjustments "opens up a number of exciting opportunities for novel ways of presenting content in the future."

In September 2020, the service added the GroupWatch feature which allows up to seven different Disney+ accounts to link up and co-view programming with one another. Viewers are able to react to content with six different emojis, and control playback for the entire group. It is available on web browser, mobile app, smart TVs and connected TV devices in the United States, and later expanded to Europe in 2020. The feature was previously tested in Australia, Canada and New Zealand.

In November 2021, Disney and IMAX announced that 13 films from the Marvel Cinematic Universe would receive IMAX Enhanced versions on Disney+, that feature IMAX's 1.90:1 aspect ratio for scenes shot in or opened up for the format. This feature became available beginning on November 12, 2021, with the IMAX Enhanced versions also adding other features such as DTS audio at a later point, as well as all IMAX Enhanced titles still retaining other features from the standard widescreen versions, like Dolby Vision and Dolby Atmos.

Disney+ has offered an app for visionOS since the Apple Vision Pro's launch; it offers 3D versions of selected films, and themed 360-degree 3D viewing environments such as the El Capitan Theatre, a Landspeeder on Tatooine (Star Wars), and Stark Tower.

== Launch ==
Available as Disney+ Available as JioHotstar (India) Confirmed launch No current launch or announcement

Launch rollout timeline
Release date	Country/territory	Release partner(s)	Hulu included? (Note: Star was replaced by Hulu in international markets on October 8, 2025.)	ESPN included?
November 12, 2019	Canada	Rogers Cable, Shaw	Yes	No
November 12, 2019	Netherlands (Note: The service received a soft launch on September 12, 2019, in the Netherlands.)	None	Yes	Yes
November 12, 2019	United States	Verizon	No (Note: Hulu content available as a separate subscription or bundled with Disney+, both as a separate app and as a content hub on Disney+, branded as "Hulu on Disney+" since December 6, 2023 (full release on March 27, 2024).)	Yes
November 19, 2019	Australia	OnePass	Yes	Yes
November 19, 2019	New Zealand	None	Yes	Yes
November 19, 2019	Puerto Rico	None	No	Yes
March 24, 2020	Austria	None	Yes	Yes
March 24, 2020	Germany	Telekom	Yes	Yes
March 24, 2020	Ireland (Note: Preceded by DisneyLife)	Sky	Yes	Yes
March 24, 2020	Italy	TIM	Yes	Yes
March 24, 2020	Spain	Movistar+, BBVA	Yes	Yes
March 24, 2020	Switzerland	None	Yes	Yes
March 24, 2020	United Kingdom	Sky, O2	Yes	Yes
April 2, 2020	Guernsey	None	Yes	Yes
April 2, 2020	Isle of Man	None	Yes	Yes
April 2, 2020	Jersey	None	Yes	Yes
April 7, 2020	France	None	Yes	Yes
April 30, 2020	French Guiana	None	Yes	Yes
April 30, 2020	French West Indies	None	Yes	Yes
April 30, 2020	Monaco	None	Yes	Yes
April 30, 2020	New Caledonia	None	Yes	Yes
April 30, 2020	Wallis and Futuna	None	Yes	Yes
June 11, 2020	Japan (Note: Preceded by Disney Deluxe)	NTT Docomo	No (Note: Due to the pre-existing Hulu Japan, the section is instead still labelled "Star".)	Yes
September 15, 2020	Belgium	None	Yes	Yes
September 15, 2020	Denmark	None	Yes	Yes
September 15, 2020	Finland	None	Yes	Yes
September 15, 2020	Greenland	None	Yes	Yes
September 15, 2020	Iceland	None	Yes	Yes
September 15, 2020	Luxembourg	None	Yes	Yes
September 15, 2020	Norway	None	Yes	Yes
September 15, 2020	Portugal	None	Yes	Yes
September 15, 2020	Sweden	None	Yes	Yes
October 2, 2020	Mauritius	None	Yes	Yes
October 2, 2020	Mayotte	None	Yes	Yes
October 2, 2020	Réunion	None	Yes	Yes
November 17, 2020	Anguilla	Visa	Yes	Yes
November 17, 2020	Antigua and Barbuda	Visa	Yes	Yes
November 17, 2020	Argentina	DirecTV, MercadoLibre, Telecentro, Personal, Cablevisión	Yes	Yes
November 17, 2020	Aruba	Visa	Yes	Yes
November 17, 2020	Bahamas	Visa	Yes	Yes
November 17, 2020	Belize	Visa	Yes	Yes
November 17, 2020	Bermuda	Visa	Yes	Yes
November 17, 2020	Bolivia	Visa	Yes	Yes
November 17, 2020	Brazil	Globoplay, Bradesco, Next, Mercado Livre, Vivo	Yes	Yes
November 17, 2020	Barbados	Visa	Yes	Yes
November 17, 2020	British Virgin Islands	Visa	Yes	Yes
November 17, 2020	Caribbean Netherlands	Visa	Yes	Yes
November 17, 2020	Cayman Islands	Visa	Yes	Yes
November 17, 2020	Chile	DirecTV, MercadoLibre, Visa	Yes	Yes
November 17, 2020	Colombia	DirecTV, Claro, Movistar, MercadoLibre, Visa	Yes	Yes
November 17, 2020	Costa Rica	Visa	Yes	Yes
November 17, 2020	Curaçao	Visa	Yes	Yes
November 17, 2020	Dominica	Visa	Yes	Yes
November 17, 2020	Dominican Republic	Visa	Yes	Yes
November 17, 2020	Ecuador	DirecTV, MercadoLibre, Visa	Yes	Yes
November 17, 2020	El Salvador	Visa	Yes	Yes
November 17, 2020	Grenada	Visa	Yes	Yes
November 17, 2020	Guatemala	Visa	Yes	Yes
November 17, 2020	Guyana	Visa	Yes	Yes
November 17, 2020	Haiti	Visa	Yes	Yes
November 17, 2020	Honduras	Visa	Yes	Yes
November 17, 2020	Jamaica	Visa	Yes	Yes
November 17, 2020	Mexico	Izzi Telecom, MercadoLibre, Telmex, Telcel, Sky, Visa, Megacable, Totalplay	Yes	Yes
November 17, 2020	Montserrat	Visa	Yes	Yes
November 17, 2020	Nicaragua	Visa	Yes	Yes
November 17, 2020	Panama	Visa	Yes	Yes
November 17, 2020	Paraguay	Flow, Visa	Yes	Yes
November 17, 2020	Peru	DirecTV, MercadoLibre, Visa	Yes	Yes
November 17, 2020	Saint Kitts and Nevis	Visa	Yes	Yes
November 17, 2020	Saint Lucia	Visa	Yes	Yes
November 17, 2020	Saint Vincent and the Grenadines	Visa	Yes	Yes
November 17, 2020	Suriname	Visa	Yes	Yes
November 17, 2020	Trinidad and Tobago	Visa	Yes	Yes
November 17, 2020	Turks and Caicos Islands	Visa	Yes	Yes
November 17, 2020	Uruguay	Cablevisión, Flow, DirecTV, MercadoLibre, Visa	Yes	Yes
November 17, 2020	Venezuela	None	Yes	Yes
February 23, 2021	Singapore	StarHub	Yes	Yes
November 12, 2021	South Korea	LG Uplus, KT Mobile	Yes	Yes
November 12, 2021	Taiwan	Taiwan Mobile	Yes	Yes
November 16, 2021	Hong Kong	Hong Kong Broadband Network	Yes	Yes
May 18, 2022	South Africa	DStv	Yes	Yes
June 8, 2022	Algeria	None	Yes	No
June 8, 2022	Bahrain	None	Yes	No
June 8, 2022	Egypt	None	Yes	No
June 8, 2022	Iraq	None	Yes	No
June 8, 2022	Jordan	None	Yes	No
June 8, 2022	Kuwait	None	Yes	No
June 8, 2022	Lebanon	None	Yes	No
June 8, 2022	Libya	None	Yes	No
June 8, 2022	Morocco	None	Yes	No
June 8, 2022	Oman	None	Yes	No
June 8, 2022	Palestine	None	Yes	No
June 8, 2022	Qatar	None	Yes	No
June 8, 2022	Saudi Arabia	None	Yes	No
June 8, 2022	Tunisia	None	Yes	No
June 8, 2022	United Arab Emirates	None	Yes	No
June 8, 2022	Yemen	None	Yes	No
June 14, 2022	Åland	None	Yes	Yes
June 14, 2022	Albania	None	Yes	Yes
June 14, 2022	Andorra	None	Yes	Yes
June 14, 2022	Bosnia and Herzegovina	None	Yes	Yes
June 14, 2022	Bulgaria	None	Yes	Yes
June 14, 2022	British Indian Ocean Territory	None	Yes	Yes
June 14, 2022	Croatia	None	Yes	Yes
June 14, 2022	Czech Republic	None	Yes	Yes
June 14, 2022	Estonia	None	Yes	Yes
June 14, 2022	Faroe Islands	None	Yes	Yes
June 14, 2022	French Polynesia	None	Yes	Yes
June 14, 2022	French Southern and Antarctic Lands	None	Yes	Yes
June 14, 2022	Gibraltar	None	Yes	Yes
June 14, 2022	Greece	None	Yes	Yes
June 14, 2022	Hungary	None	Yes	Yes
June 14, 2022	Kosovo	None	Yes	Yes
June 14, 2022	Latvia	None	Yes	Yes
June 14, 2022	Liechtenstein	None	Yes	Yes
June 14, 2022	Lithuania	None	Yes	Yes
June 14, 2022	Malta	None	Yes	Yes
June 14, 2022	Montenegro	None	Yes	Yes
June 14, 2022	North Macedonia	None	Yes	Yes
June 14, 2022	Pitcairn Islands	None	Yes	Yes
June 14, 2022	Poland	Plus, Polsat Box, Netia, Polsat Box Go	Yes	Yes
June 14, 2022	Romania	None	Yes	Yes
June 14, 2022	Saint Pierre and Miquelon	None	Yes	Yes
June 14, 2022	Saint Helena, Ascension and Tristan da Cunha	None	Yes	Yes
June 14, 2022	San Marino	None	Yes	Yes
June 14, 2022	Serbia	None	Yes	Yes
June 14, 2022	Sint Maarten	None	Yes	Yes
June 14, 2022	Slovakia	None	Yes	Yes
June 14, 2022	Slovenia	None	Yes	Yes
June 14, 2022	Svalbard and Jan Mayen	None	Yes	Yes
June 14, 2022	Turkey	None	Yes	Yes
June 14, 2022	Vatican City	None	Yes	Yes
June 16, 2022	Israel	None	Yes	No
November 17, 2022	Philippines	Globe Telecom, Cignal	Yes	Yes
October 8, 2025 (Note: Rebranded from Disney+ Hotstar.)	Indonesia (Note: Launched as Disney+ Hotstar on September 5, 2020.)	Telkomsel, Telkom Indonesia, XLSmart	Yes	No
October 8, 2025	Malaysia (Note: Launched as Disney+ Hotstar on June 1, 2021.)	Astro, unifi (unifi TV)	Yes	No
October 8, 2025	Thailand (Note: Launched as Disney+ Hotstar on June 30, 2021.)	AIS	Yes	No

Other versions
	Release date	Country/territory	Release partner(s)	Star included? (Note: Unless otherwise indicated, "Yes" means Star programming has been available since the later of February 23, 2021, and the launch of Disney+ in the indicated country/territory.)
JioHotstar	February 11, 2015 (Hotstar) April 3, 2020 (Disney+ Hotstar) (Note: The service was originally to be launched on March 29, but was delayed due to the ongoing COVID-19 pandemic.) February 14, 2025 (JioHotstar)	India	None	Yes (Note: Select programs that are marketed as Star programming elsewhere are included in Disney+ Hotstar under various hubs including Star World, ABC Studios, Select Picks, and others.)

=== Launch as a standalone Disney+ ===
Disney+ was launched early in the Netherlands on September 12, 2019, as a free trial. It officially launched in the Netherlands, United States and Canada on November 12, 2019, just before 3:00 a.m. EST (UTC–5). Disney+ launched in Australia, New Zealand and Puerto Rico on November 19, 2019, and launched in Austria, the United Kingdom, Spain, Italy, Germany, Ireland and Switzerland on March 24, 2020. In the UK and Ireland, Disney+ replaced DisneyLife. In Spain, a linear Disney+ television channel launched alongside the streaming service. The channel is available exclusively on Movistar Plus+, which serves as Disney+'s launch partner in the region.

In December 2019, it was announced that Canal+ would be the exclusive distributor of Disney+ in France. The launch in France was delayed from March 24 to April 7, pursuant to a request from the French government to conserve network capacity due to the COVID-19 pandemic placing additional strain on communications networks. The streaming service, along with the Disney channels were removed from the provider on December 31, 2024, after failing to renew its distrution deal between the two.

In April 2020, it was announced that Disney+ original content would be licensed to pay TV and streaming operator OSN, starting on April 9, in 17 countries in the Middle East and North Africa region with Disney noting that they had no current "plan to launch Disney+ as a standalone service in the region in the near future".

The service launched in Japan on June 11, 2020, as part of Disney's existing partnership with NTT Docomo, and succeeded the existing Disney Deluxe service in the region.

Few months later, Disney+ service expanded in Portugal, Belgium, Finland, Iceland, Luxembourg, Norway, Sweden and Denmark on September 15, 2020; and in Latin America and the Caribbean on November 17, 2020.

The service expanded to Singapore on February 23, 2021.

On August 12, 2021, Disney announced that it would launch in the Middle East and Africa in mid-2022. Following the announcement, all the Disney+ original content has been removed from OSN, which its platform were previously host Disney+ original content through licensing since April 2020.

It was announced that the service would also expand to Central and Eastern Europe, Hong Kong, Taiwan, South Korea, Israel, South Africa and Turkey later in between 2021 and 2022. Among them, it has been confirmed that the service would launch on November 12, 2021, in South Korea and Taiwan, and on November 16, 2021, in Hong Kong. It became available in more than 50 countries in 2022. It was going to be available in more than 160 countries by the end of 2023, but it wasn't released in more countries during that year.

On March 29, 2022, Disney announced that it would launch the service in South Africa on May 18, 2022, in the Middle East and North Africa (excluding Syria) on June 8, 2022, in most of the remaining European countries on June 14, 2022, and in Israel on June 16, 2022.

The service was also launched in the Philippines on November 17, 2022, in addition to mobile plan launch.

=== The Disney Bundle ===
Alongside the launch of the standalone Disney+ service in the U.S., Disney also announced a bundle including its other U.S. streaming services Hulu (ad-supported version) and ESPN+, marketed as The Disney Bundle, initially for US$12.99 per month; the monthly price of this plan subsequently increased to $13.99. Additional variants of the bundle were later added including the ad-free and Live TV variants of Hulu; then, in late 2021, Disney+ and ESPN+ became non-removable parts of the Hulu + Live TV package.

In connection with the August 10, 2022, announcement of the ad-supported version of Disney+ launching on December 8, several new bundle options and increased prices were announced as taking effect the same day. Monthly prices for these plans range from $9.99 (for Disney Bundle Duo Basic, a new bundle with ad-supported versions of Disney+ and Hulu, but not ESPN+) to $82.99 (for Hulu + Live TV with the ad-free versions of Disney+ and Hulu streaming content, as well as ESPN+, which is only offered as an ad-supported service). The monthly price of the original bundle with ad-free Disney+, ad-supported Hulu and ESPN+ increased to $14.99; however, that plan only remains available to existing subscribers.

=== Other bundles ===
Other bundled options, sometimes including third-party services, have been offered in various countries. In Latin America, bundles have been offered incorporating Disney+ and Star+, as well as Lionsgate's streaming service Lionsgate+ (formerly Starzplay) in some countries of Latin America, until Lionsgate+'s discontinuation on December 11, 2023. In Brazil, there is also a bundle of Disney+ and Globoplay offered on Globoplay's website. In Japan, a bundle of Disney+ and Hulu Japan (which had been sold by Hulu's previous ownership group to Nippon TV in 2014) was launched in 2023.

In summer 2024 in the U.S., Disney and Warner Bros. Discovery began offering a bundle comprising Disney+, Hulu and WBD's Max for a discounted price (it was already possible to subscribe to Max at regular price as an add-on to Hulu).

In June 2025, Disney and Bell Media announced plans to offer bundles in Canada including Disney+, Bell's Crave, and the streaming version of their jointly-owned sports service TSN. In the same month, starting June 9, Vix Premium subscriptions in Mexico include access to the ad-supported Disney+ Standard plan, as part of a distribution deal between TelevisaUnivision and Disney Entertainment.

In November 2025 in Korea, as part of a strategic partnership between Disney Korea and TVING, an integrated subscription product was launched that allows users to watch Disney+, TVING, and Wavve together with a single subscription.

In October 2026, Disney+ and Indonesian streaming service Vidio launched the "Vidio Ultimate Disney+ All Screen Bundle," combining Disney+'s international films, original series, and live ESPN programming with Vidio's local original series, domestic sinetrons, and sports broadcasts, including the Premier League and UEFA Champions League. As part of the partnership, Vidio users received access to a rotational "Taste of Disney+" promotional selection, with plans established to distribute select Vidio programming to Disney+ subscribers.

=== Launch as Disney+ Hotstar ===
In February 2020, Iger announced that it planned to launch Disney+ in India on March 29, 2020, by means of its existing service Hotstar, rebranding its paid tiers as a co-branded service. Hotstar was acquired by Disney during the Fox purchase, and has been the dominant streaming service in the country. However, it was postponed due to the Indian Premier League being rescheduled due to the COVID-19 pandemic. It was then launched on April 3, 2020. A few months later, Disney+ launched in Indonesia through Hotstar on September 5, 2020.

On February 25, 2021, it was reported that Disney+ was launched in Malaysia and Thailand through Hotstar within 2021. It was later confirmed that the launch would take place in Malaysia on June 1, 2021, and Thailand on June 30, 2021. Later on, there was a report stating the service was expected to launch in Vietnam in 2022, although no updates have been made since then regarding a launch of Disney+ in the region.

The Disney+ service officially launched in the 17 MENA markets, including Israel, in June 2022. Although not branded as Hotstar, a variant of the Disney+ Hotstar app for non-PC devices was made available for these markets. It has the same user interface and login system as Hotstar but does not support the Disney ID SSO like the international version of the Disney+ app does. In fact, users in the MENA markets are met with an error message upon booting the international version of the Disney+ app, and MENA subscribers cannot access their accounts outside the region, and vice versa. This variant is also available for South Africa and the Philippines.

On October 8, 2025, Disney+ Hotstar was rebranded as Disney+ in Indonesia, Malaysia, and Thailand. Disney made this global change to streamline its services and make the viewer experience more consistent; as part of this, the Star brand was replaced by Hulu. As part of this transition, the original Disney+ Hotstar app was discontinued, and the variant Disney+ app used in the MENA region, South Africa, and the Philippines is now available for these markets.

In July 2026, the international version of the Disney+ app expanded its language support to 58 audio languages and over 30 user interface languages, while offering subtitles in up to 42 languages. The update introduced localized support for languages including Arabic, Indonesian, Hindi, and Thai, as well as a native right-to-left (RTL) interface for scripts such as Arabic and Hebrew. Beginning in September 2026, Disney phased out the Hotstar-derived variant of the Disney+ app in the remaining countries where it was still used, replacing it with the international version of the Disney+ app. The transition was started in Egypt on September 2, followed by Indonesia on September 3, South Africa and Israel on September 9, Thailand on September 16, the rest of the MENA markets on October 6, and Malaysia and the Philippines on October 7.

=== Star content hub launch ===
Star, Disney's brand for non-family-oriented entertainment, launched on February 23, 2021, in Canada, Europe, Australia, New Zealand, and Singapore. Star was added to Disney+ in Japan on October 27, 2021, and launched along with the service in South Korea and Taiwan on November 12 and Hong Kong on November 16 that year. Star was later introduced in South Africa, MENA and Eastern Europe in the summer of 2022. Disney+ in Turkey and Greece weren't carrying the Star brand due to local channels having the name, it was called "More Entertainment", instead. It became available in the Philippines since November 17, 2022.

The launch of Star marked the first time content classified more mature than the PG-13 and TV-14 ratings was able to be streamed on Disney+.

On May 3, 2023, the Star hub was launched in Indonesia, Malaysia, and Thailand, where Disney+ Hotstar streaming platform was available.

Star was added in Latin America on June 26, 2024, replacing a separate streaming service Star+, which was discontinued on July 24, 2024.

=== Hulu on Disney+ launch and phase-out of Star ===
On December 6, 2023, Disney added a Hulu content hub to Disney+ as a beta for U.S. Disney Bundle subscribers. Disney+ only subscribers also have a small portion of Hulu catalogue available to watch. On March 27, 2024, the Hulu content hub officially exited beta.

On August 6, 2025, after the completion of its acquisition of Comcast's stake in the service, Disney announced plans to fully migrate Hulu to the Disney+ platform in the United States. While Disney+ and Hulu will remain separate subscription products, their separate apps are to be replaced by a new "unified" platform in 2026. Concurrently, Disney also announced that it would replace Star with Hulu as its "global general entertainment brand" on October 8.

== Reception ==
View source data.
Evolution of worldwide subscribers of Disney+ (Note: Attributed to multiple references:)

On November 13, 2019, a day after its launch, Disney announced that the streaming service had already signed up more than 10 million subscribers. Disney+ was well received due to its pricing and for the Disney library. Frank Pallotta of CNN stated that "the company [Disney] has repackaged its trove of beloved content for the service makes it a worthy companion to the other services in the marketplace. Nick Pino of TechRadar stated, "If Disney keeps it updated with new content, Disney+ could rival Netflix sooner rather than later."

Upon launch, Disney+ experienced significant technical difficulties. Users complained about receiving error messages that the service was down and that they were "unable to connect", which were irritating because many of them had paid for the service months in advance. In some instances, passwords needed to be reset to enable access.

One other negative aspect with the launch of the service was the presentation of the non-HD episodes of The Simpsons. Namely, that instead of presenting them in their original aspect ratio, they were either cropped to fit 16:9 widescreen televisions or awkwardly stretched out to that aspect ratio. FXX's now-defunct "Simpsons World" streaming service was similarly criticized when it launched. In response, Disney stated they would make the ability to watch the episodes of the first 19 seasons and some from season 20 in either the 4:3 or 16:9 aspect ratio in early 2020. The feature was made available on May 28, 2020.

Some have noted that episodes of The Simpsons, X-Men, DuckTales, Phineas and Ferb, Kim Possible, and The Avengers: Earth's Mightiest Heroes are presented almost entirely out of order, while some series are missing episodes. Others have questioned why an extensive catalog of Disney-owned material is missing from the platform, including older Disney-produced films, Disney Junior titles, Marvel content, some Muppets media, and the unreleased Star Wars animated comedy series Star Wars Detours. On June 26, 2020, the 2017 DuckTales series had its episodes arranged in the proper order while co-creator of Phineas and Ferb, Jeff "Swampy" Marsh, has stated that they are working on correcting the order of his series.

Disney+ was the top trending Google search term in 2019 in the U.S. In February 2020, Disney reported that Disney+ had 26.5 million subscribers by the end of 2019, and 28.6 million by February 3, 2020. By April 2020, Disney+ had 50 million paid subscribers, with approximately 8 million of those coming from India. The service had 54.5 million subscribers by May 4, 57.5 million subscribers by the end of June, 60.5 million subscribers by August 4, 73.7 million subscribers by September 30, and 86.8 million subscribers as of December 2. In February 2021, Disney reported that Disney+ had 94.9 million subscribers as of January 2, 2021. On March 9, 2021, Disney reported that the service had surpassed 100 million paid subscribers but did not say when it had hit the milestone. The company clarified that it would now only be providing subscriber number updates when certain milestones are reached, as opposed to releasing exact numbers each quarter.

In 2020, Apple Inc. named Disney+ the Apple TV App of the Year. It was the second- and third-most-downloaded free app of the year globally on the iPad and iPhone, respectively. It was also voted the best app of 2020 by Google Play users. In H1 of 2021, the app reached 125 million downloads.

== See also ==
- Disney+ Day
