= Interia =

Polish web portal and online news platform

- Website type: Web portal
- Founded: 1999
- Headquarters: 11 Kotlarska Street; Kraków; Poland
- Editor: Piotr Witwicki
- Industry: Media
- Employees: 200-500
- Website: interia.pl
- Launched: 2000

Interia, formerly Interia.pl, is a large Polish web portal and online news platform launched in 2000 in Kraków, Poland. It is the 4th largest online news source in the country.

The list of its 130 services includes the national and international news in the Polish language followed by business news, sports, motorization and new technologies, as well as online games, blogs, chat rooms, internet forums and a shopping arcade, not to mention the streaming radio and Internet television channels. It also offers, among others: new email accounts, free web hosting, and domain name registration. Interia hosts one of Polish online encyclopedias, the Encyklopedia Internautica and the thematic catalogue of websites. It features also the weather info, astrology, virtual greeting cards popular locally, and hundreds of online chats (czaterie) with the "KidProtect" option.

== History ==
=== Creation and ownership ===
The portal was established by the ComArch Management IT corporation (listed on Warsaw Stock Exchange) and the RMF FM radio network. The Interia S.A. company was almost wholly owned by RMF FM parent company, the German multimedia conglomerate Bauer Media Group, represented by Witold Woźniak. Bauer bought 96,6% of its shares in September 2008 and controlled 99% of its vote. In 2020, the company has been purchased by Cyfrowy Polsat S.A., owned by Zygmunt Solorz, the second richest person in Poland.

=== Spam redirection ===
Due to its availability and relaxed internal policy, the free hosting service Interia has become a popular spam redirector in 2009. Spammers frequently linked to its free sub-domains in their spam campaigns to avoid having their messages easily detected as junk and automatically blocked. Although, there are many legitimate webpages as well as services listed at Interia (or perhaps because of it), spammers signed up for its free accounts in volumes similar to GeoCities (Yahoo!-owned service), although their perennial favorite seemed to be Google's Blogspot based in the US. The redirect pages created by spammers at Interia link only to spamvertising.

== Audience ==
As of 2024, Interia was the 4th largest news source in Poland, reaching 25% of Internet users every week, according to Digital News Report. Forbes magazine reported in 2020 that it was then visited by 16 million monthly active users, with more than 1.3 billion visits each month.
