= Polsat Plus Arena =

Polsat Plus Arena may refer to sport object in Tricity, Pomeranian Voivodeship, Poland for sponsorship reasons contract with the media and telecommunications companies Polsat and Plus:

- Polsat Plus Arena Gdańsk, football stadium
- Polsat Plus Arena Gdynia, indoor arena
