= Encyklopedia Internautica =

Polish Internet encyclopedia

Encyklopedia Internautica (Polish: "Encyclopedia Internautica") is a Polish Internet encyclopedia based on the Popularna Encyklopedia Powszechna (Popular Universal Encyclopedia) or Pinnex. It is freely accessible on the pages of Interia, Poland's third largest internet portal. As of 2006 the Encyklopedia Internautica had more than 120,000 entries.
