= Disney Deluxe =

Defunct Japanese video streaming service

- Website type: OTT streaming platform
- Dissolved: June 11, 2020; 6 years ago
- Successor: Disney+
- Area served: Japan
- Owners: The Walt Disney Company Japan; NTT Docomo
- Key people: Tony Ellison (Vice President & General Manager of Walt Disney Japan)
- Website: www.deluxe.disney.co.jp
- Registration: Required
- Launched: March 26, 2019; 7 years ago
- Current status: Defunct

Disney Deluxe (ディズニーデラックス), stylized as Disney DELUXE, was a Japanese subscription video streaming service owned and operated by the Walt Disney Japan and NTT Docomo.

== Overview ==
On March 7, 2019, Walt Disney Japan and NTT Docomo announced that they would launch a video streaming service called Disney Deluxe on March 26. The service offered video content from four of Disney's owned brands: Disney, Pixar, Star Wars, and Marvel, and the monthly subscription fee was 756 yen.

The Walt Disney Company had planned to launch its streaming service Disney+ in the second half of the year, but Tony Ellison, Vice President & General Manager of Walt Disney Japan, stated that "Disney Deluxe" was a separate service from Disney+ and was born out of a special relationship with Docomo. Luke Kang, managing director of North Asia for the Walt Disney Company, also said, "We recognize Japan as a special market and have taken a special approach for Japan. In that context, we introduced Disney Deluxe."

In addition to web browsers, Android, and iOS apps, Disney Deluxe was also compatible with Android TV-equipped televisions, Amazon Fire TV, Apple TV, and Chromecast. The highest video quality available for streaming was Full HD. To subscribe, users were required to have a Docomo web service account called "d-account".

On April 10, 2019, Disney announced that Solo: A Star Wars Story, which was released in Japan on June 29 of the previous year, would be the first new movie available on Disney Deluxe, with streaming beginning on April 17.

On August 7, 2019, Disney announced that the Disney Channel original movie Descendants 3 would be available for streaming on Disney Deluxe on September 13 in Japan ahead of its first broadcast in the country.

The Mandalorian was exclusively available for streaming on Disney+ in the United States, but on December 26, 2019, it became available for streaming on Disney Deluxe in Japan.

On April 8, 2020, Kevin Mayer, Disney's streaming chairman, announced that the number of Disney+ subscribers had exceeded 50 million, and at the same time, he stated that the service would be launched in Japan. However, no specific details such as the launch date or pricing were disclosed, and it was reported that it would be a separate service from Disney Deluxe.

On May 28, 2020, Walt Disney Japan announced that it would begin offering Disney+ in Japan through an exclusive partnership with Docomo starting June 11, 2020. Disney+ was not a separate service from Disney Deluxe, but was launched as an updated version of Disney Deluxe. Existing Disney Deluxe subscribers were automatically transitioned to Disney+ without any additional fees or changes to their contracts.
