= NASK =

Facility in Warsaw, Poland

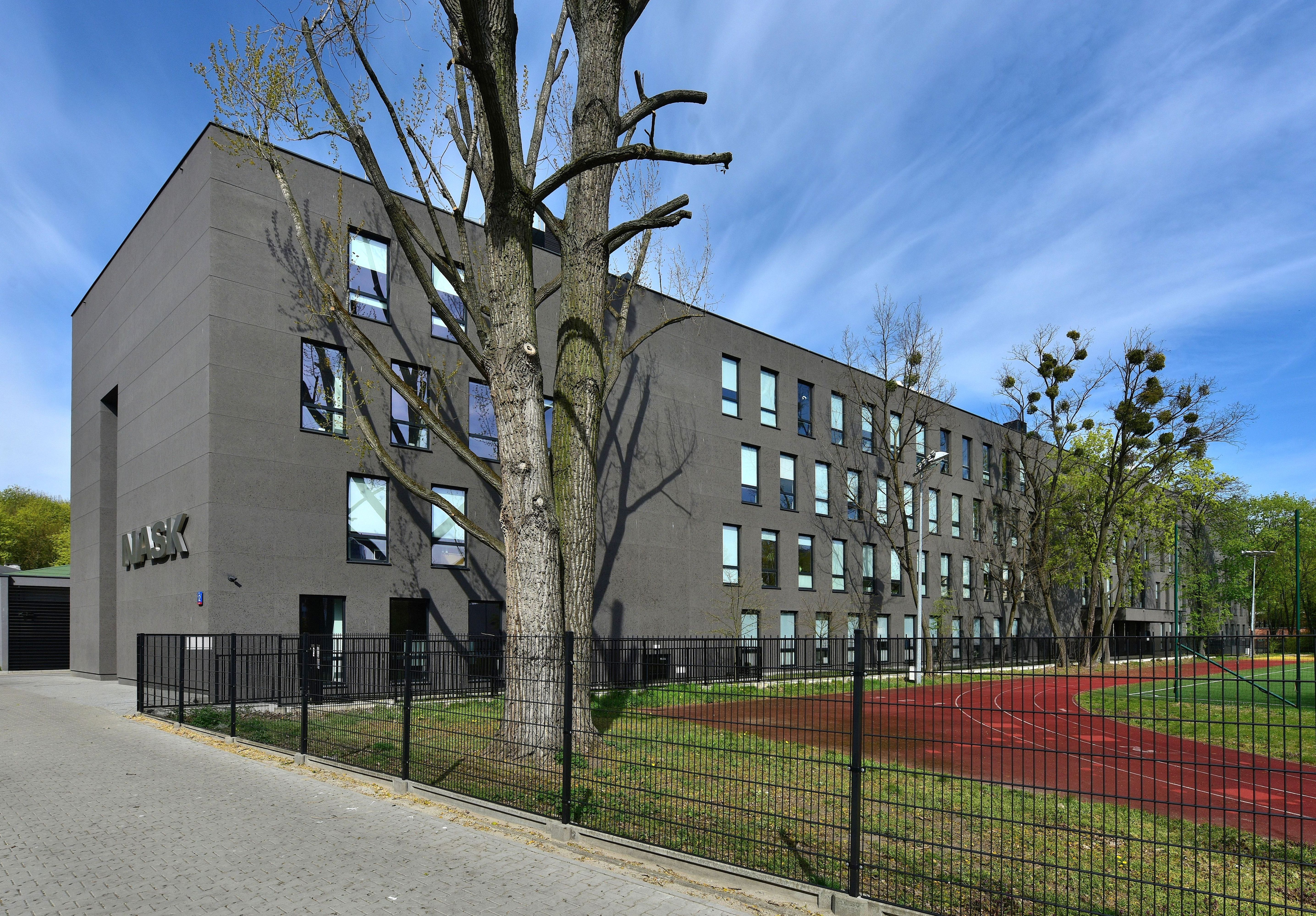
- Type: Research institute
- Industry: Telecommunications
- Founded: 1991
- Headquarters: Warsaw, Poland
- Products: Network security products
- Revenue: 106 274 164 (2014)
- Operating income: 75 698 492 (2014)
- Net income: 31 974 411 (2014)
- Total assets: 235 611 257 (2014)
- Owner: Government of Poland
- Number of employees: 312 (2014)
- Subsidiaries: NASK4Innovation Sp. z o.o.
- Website: www.nask.pl/en

The Naukowa i Akademicka Sieć Komputerowa (English: Research and Academic Computer Network), abbreviated NASK, is a Polish research and development organisation, data networks operator, and internet domain name registry operator for the .pl country-level top-level domain. It also includes the CERT Polska computer emergency response team and the Dyżurnet.pl point of contact for reporting potentially illegal online material.

== .pl registry ==
NASK is the internet domain name registry operator for the .pl country-level top-level domain.

Besides domain registration, NASK offers through its Partners such services as Waiting List Service (WLS) – the so-called "option" enabling the purchase of the 3-year period of priority for registration of a domain name in case it has been deleted, or Domain Name Tasting (DNT) – a service consisting in registration of a domain name for the period of 14 days for the purpose of testing its attractiveness.

NASK was one of the first registries in the world to introduce the maintenance of internationalized domain names in 2003.

Since 1 July 2013, NASK is the registry operator for .gov.pl domain names.

NASK is the official representative of Poland in international organisations such as FIRST, CENTR and ICANN.

== CERT Polska ==
NASK includes a computer emergency response team called CERT Polska. Active since 1996, it handles security incidents and conducts internet security-related research and development. It is a member of the international forum of response teams (FIRST) since 1998, and a member of the working group of the European response teams TERENA TF-CSIRT since 2000.

== Dyzurnet.pl ==
The Dyżurnet.pl team within NASK is a point of contact that has been functioning within the framework of NASK since 2005. It responds to anonymous reports received from Internet users about potentially illegal material, such as child abuse content. Dyżurnet.pl also carries out awareness raising and educational activities to increase the level of the online safety of children and young people by, among others, taking various initiatives, including campaigns, conferences, trainings for professionals and experts as well as workshops for the youngest Internet users.
