= List of Poles by net worth =

This is a list of Polish billionaires based on an annual assessment of wealth and assets compiled and published by Forbes magazine in 2025.

== 2025 Polish billionaires list ==
World Rank	Name	Citizenship	Net worth (USD)	Source of wealth
702	Michał Sołowow	Poland	5.8 billion	investments
703	Jerzy Starak	Poland	5.5 billion	pharmaceuticals
1397	Zygmunt Solorz	Poland	2.8 billion	TV broadcasting
1402	Paweł Marchewka	Poland	2.8 billion	videogames
1813	Dominika Kulczyk	Poland	2.1 billion	Inherited from her late father, Jan Kulczyk
1982	Zbigniew Juroszek	Poland	1.9 billion	real estate, gambling
2065	Sebastian Kulczyk	Poland	1.8 billion	Inherited from his late father, Jan Kulczyk

== See also ==
- The World's Billionaires
- List of countries by the number of billionaires
