= Elektrim =

Polish public company

Elektrim SA, is a Polish public company trading since 1992 on the Warsaw Stock Exchange, and is the result of the privatization of the former PHZ Elektrim. In the first period after privatization, Elektrim SA conducted very extensive and diversified activities through more than 140 associated companies (with businesses ranging from turbines to agricultural production), but this activity was reorganized from 1999.

Elektrim SA operates essentially as a holding company. Its most valuable assets (Elektrim Telekomunikacja, Zespół Elektrowni Pątnów-Adamów-Konin) are separate entities (companies), to a significant extent, however, supported financially by the parent (by way of shareholder loans, guarantees, and safeguards provided for the assets of the parent).

Elektrim Group employs several thousand people (of whom 48 are employed directly at Elektrim SA).

Elektrim SA holds directly 0.39% of ZE PAK shares, and through its subsidiary Embud, an additional 1.16%. Embud also owns 9.08% of shares in Cyfrowy Polsat.
