= .pl =

Internet country code top-level domain for Poland

- Introduced: July 30, 1990; 36 years ago
- TLD type: Country code
- Status: Active
- Registry: NASK
- Sponsor: NASK
- Intended use: Entities connected with Poland
- Actual use: Very popular in Poland
- Registered domains: 2,569,407 (1 December 2025)
- Registration restrictions: No restrictions stated
- Structure: Registrations can be made directly at second level, or at third level beneath various second level labels
- Dispute policies: PIIT arbitration (for Polish entities); WIPO expedited arbitration (for foreign entities)
- DNSSEC: yes
- Registry website: dns.pl

.pl is the Internet country code top-level domain (ccTLD) for Poland, administered by NASK, the Polish research and development organization. It is one of the founding members of CENTR.

== History ==
The .pl domain was created in 1990, following the mitigation of the COCOM embargo on technological collaboration with post-communist countries. The first subdomain in .pl was .pwr.pl, belonging to the Wrocław University of Technology.

In 2008 the number of registered .pl domain names exceeded one million, whereas at the end of 2013 the registry comprised more than 2.4 million domain names.

Each domain must be registered in the National Domain Name Registry.

== Second-level domains ==
Several functional and regional domain endings exist. Most popular are:

=== Functional domains ===
- .com.pl, .biz.pl, .pl: commercial entities
- .net.pl: network infrastructure
- .art.pl: art
- .edu.pl: education
- .gov.pl: government
- .info.pl: (general) information
- .mil.pl: military
- .org.pl: NGOs and not-for-profit organizations

=== Regional domains ===
There are 118 regional domain endings in the .pl zone. Some of them are:

- .bialystok.pl: Białystok (city)
- .czest.pl: Częstochowa (city)
- .gda.pl, .gdansk.pl: Gdańsk (city)
- .gorzow.pl: Gorzów Wielkopolski (city)
- .katowice.pl: Katowice (city)
- .krakow.pl: Kraków (city)
- .lublin.pl: Lublin (city)
- .malopolska.pl: Małopolska (region)
- .mazowsze.pl: Mazowsze (region)
- .olsztyn.pl: Olsztyn (city)
- .pila.pl: Piła (city)
- .poznan.pl: Poznań (city)
- .rzeszow.pl: Rzeszów (city)
- .szczecin.pl: Szczecin (city)
- .slask.pl: Śląsk (region)
- .torun.pl: Toruń (city)
- .wroc.pl, .wroclaw.pl: Wrocław (city)
- .waw.pl, .warszawa.pl: Warsaw (city)
- .zgora.pl: Zielona Góra (city)
