= Orange Polska =

Polish telecommunications provider

Orange Polska SA
- Type: Public
- Traded as: WSE: OPL
- Industry: Telecommunications
- Founded: 4 December 1991; 34 years ago (as Telekomunikacja Polska); 16 April 2012; 14 years ago (as Orange Polska)
- Headquarters: Warsaw, Poland
- Key people: Liudmila Climoc (President of the Management Board); Maciej Witucki (chairman of the supervisory board)
- Revenue: ▲PLN 15.715 billion (2010)
- Net income: ▲PLN 0.107 billion (2010)
- Owner: Orange S.A. (50.67%)
- Number of employees: 12,376 (2019)
- ASN: 5617
- Website: www.orange.pl

Orange Polska SA (formerly Telekomunikacja Polska) is a Polish telecommunications provider established in December 1991. It is a public company traded on the Warsaw Stock Exchange, with a controlling stake owned by Orange S.A., the latter controlling over 50% of this stake by 2002. It operates the following services: PSTN, ISDN, GSM 900/1800 network (+ 3G UMTS, 4G LTE and 5G NR), ADSL, IDSL, FTTH fibre Internet, Frame Relay, ATM and Inmarsat.

== History ==
Telekomunikacja Polska was established in December 1991 as a joint stock company under the control of the State Treasury, following the split-up of the communist era state-owned PTT entity Polish Post, Telegraph and Telephone. On 1 January 1992, the company began operations under the name of 'TP SA'. The company changed its ownership structure in 1998 and began trading on the Warsaw Stock Exchange in 2000. In the same year, the Treasury sold a 35% stake in TPSA to a consortium of France Télécom and Kulczyk Holding, with the consortium increasing its stake by a further 12.5% in 2001.

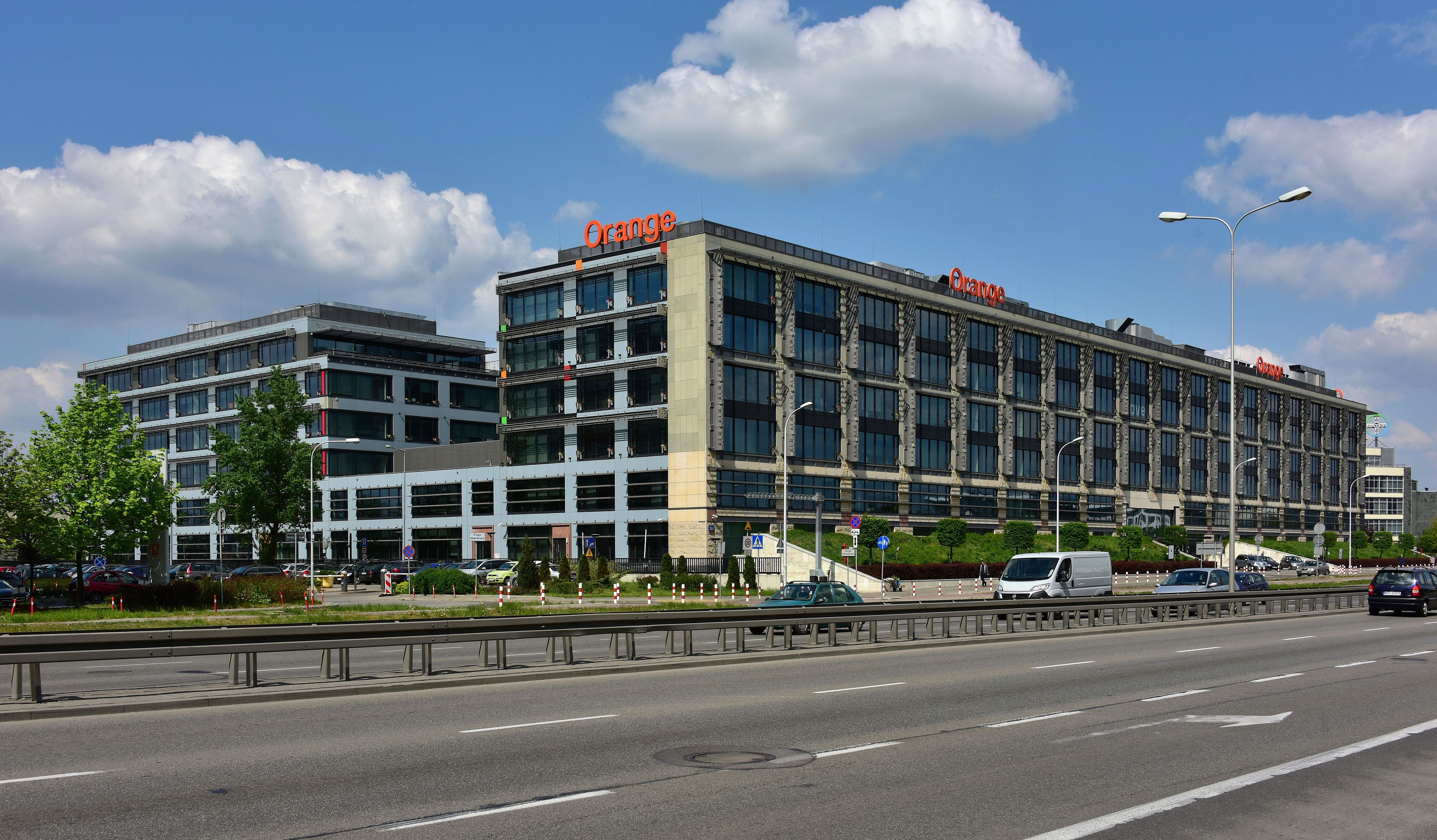
Headquarters in Warsaw, Aleje Jerozolimskie 160

On 21 December 2007, TP SA was fined PLN 75 million (approximately EUR 20.7 million) by the Office for Competition and Consumer Protection for discriminating against its competitors on the internet services market.

Full privatisation of the company was completed in May 2010.

In 2010 the company reported that they had almost 500,000 pay TV subscribers, with the number now being 695,000 (as of late 2012). The company currently serves approximately 5.6 million broadband customers.

In 2011, TP SA had a $430 million claim filed against them by GN Store Nord (GN), which owns 75% of DPTG, in the second phase of an arbitration trial. Bloomberg reported that, "DPTG won a 2.2 billion-krone award in September at an arbitration tribunal in Vienna. The tribunal said the company had improperly calculated what it owed DPTG for a fiber-optic transmission system the venture installed in 1991. "TP SA" owed payments based on data traffic over the network. The companies disagreed over how to measure the traffic and spent nine years in arbitration. The September award covered traffic from 1994 to 2004, and the new claim refers to 2004 to 2009. TPSA has not paid the first award and has filed a complaint about the arbitration, while GN has started enforcement proceedings in Poland and the Netherlands."

On 16 April 2012, Telekomunikacja Polska was renamed as Orange Polska, in line with France Télécom's international telecommunications branding.

== Internet service ==
Orange Polska's ADSL service in Poland was called Neostrada. The service was widely available throughout the country and was one of the most heavily subscribed to in Poland. Since of February 2026, it is no longer possible to order the service.

Orange Polska operates one of the largest residential fibre Internet (FTTH) networks in the country, branded as Orange Światłowód (formerly Orange Supernova).

== Mobile network ==
Under branding as Idea

The network was formerly known as PTK Centertel, the brand name of its previous analogue mobile network

Orange Polska mobile was founded in December 1991 to operate an analogue (first-generation) network under the Centertel brand. The network used Nordic Mobile Telephone standard known as NMT450i - working on 450 MHz band with some improvements copied from NMT900.

In 1998, it launched Idea, Poland's third GSM network, operating on both the 900 and 1800-MHz bands from the beginning. Until 2001, when the network stopped registering new subscribers for analogue services, Idea was known as Idea Centertel. Idea's slogan was Łączy Cię z ludźmi ("Connects you with people").

In March 2010, NMT network shutdown has been announced. However, network had been kept operational until 2012 as it had a few hundred active users. Former analogue customers were offered GSM contracts by 2012 to set up a CDMA2000 network on 450 MHz band.

Idea adopted the Orange brand name in 2005, although the operating company was still legally called PTK Centertel until 31 December 2013. It, along with parent company Orange Polska S.A., is controlled by Orange S.A. The brand change took place simultaneously on 19 September 2005. The company sponsored a free concert in Warsaw by British musician Sting on 24 September 2005 for 150,000 of its clients to publicise the changeover.

The company also operates WLAN, 3G UMTS, 4G LTE and 5G NR networks in Poland. As of late 2011, the network had 14.7 million subscribers.

In March 2013, Orange Poland (OPL) officially launched mobile access to the Internet using IPv6 protocol for its subscribers. Solution is based on IPv6-only APN with CLAT/NAT64/DNS. Implementation of the 464xlat architecture. is mandatory on device - CPE

== Acquisitions ==
In December 2025, it was announced that Orange Polska had entered into a preliminary agreement to acquire fibre-optic wholesaler Nexera jointly with the Dutch pension fund, APG through their joint venture, Światłowód Inwestycje. The transaction was valued at approximately €350 million and remained subject to customary regulatory approvals and closing conditions.

== See also ==
- WT-4 – former Polish and Eastern Bloc telephone jack and plug standard
