= Polsat Box =

Polish satellite TV platform

Cyfrowy Polsat S.A.
- Company type: Public
- Traded as: WSE: CPS
- Industry: Telecommunication
- Founded: December 5, 1999; 26 years ago
- Founder: Zygmunt Solorz-Żak
- Headquarters: Warsaw, Poland
- Area served: Most of Europe
- Key people: Tomasz Gillner-Gorywoda (President & CEO); Mirosław Błaszczyk (President of the management board); Zygmunt Solorz-Żak (Chairman of the supervisory board)
- Products: Direct broadcast satellite, television programs, mobile telephony, Internet services
- Website: polsatbox.pl

Cyfrowy Polsat S.A. ([t͡sɨˈfrɔvɨ ˈpɔlsat]; English: Digital Polsat), trading as Polsat Box, is a Polish DTH satellite TV platform. It is the fifth-largest digital platform in Europe and the largest in Central and Eastern Europe. Polsat Box has 3.47 million subscribers and, along with its associated mobile network Plus, is one of the major brands of Grupa Polsat Plus, the trade name of the Cyfrowy Polsat S.A. corporate group.

Cyfrowy Polsat S.A. is, from April 2011, the owner of Polsat. The financing of the acquisition of Polsat in May 2011 was possible due to the issuing of shares and external sources. With Polsat, Cyfrowy was able to add a very important standing leg to its portfolio regarding TV production and broadcasting.

== History ==
Fifth and former logo, used from 2006–2021

Polsat Box was launched on 5 December 1999 as Polsat 2 Cyfrowy. The platform was known as Cyfrowy Polsat from 13 June 2003 until 30 August 2021.

== Packages of Polsat Box ==
=== Current packages ===
- Pakiet S
- Pakiet M
- Pakiet M Sport
- Pakiet L

=== Former packages ===
- Pakiet Familijny
- Pakiet Familijny HD
- Pakiet Familijny Max HD
- Pakiet Rodzinny HD
- Pakiet Podstawowy
- Pakiet Premium
- Pakiet Premium Max
- Pakiet Premium Max Plus
- Pakiet Mini
- Pakiet Mini Max
- Pakiet Mini HD

== Additional options ==
=== Current options ===
- Disney+
- Polsat Sport Premium
- Eleven Sports
- Sport Max
- HBO, HBO Max
- Cinemax
- FilmBox Pack
- Catalogue of VOD movies
- Rozrywka
- Dzieci

=== Former options ===
- Pakiet Max HD
- Pakiet Film
- Pakiet Film HD
- Pakiet Sport
- Pakiet Sport HD
- Pakiet Rozrywka
- Pakiet Rozrywka HD
- Pakiet HD
- Pakiet HBO HD
- Pakiet Relax Mix
- Pakiet Relax Mix + HBO
- Pakiet Super Film
- Pakiet Bajeczka
- Pakiet Muzyka

== See also ==
- Television in Poland
- Polsat
