= CERT Polska =

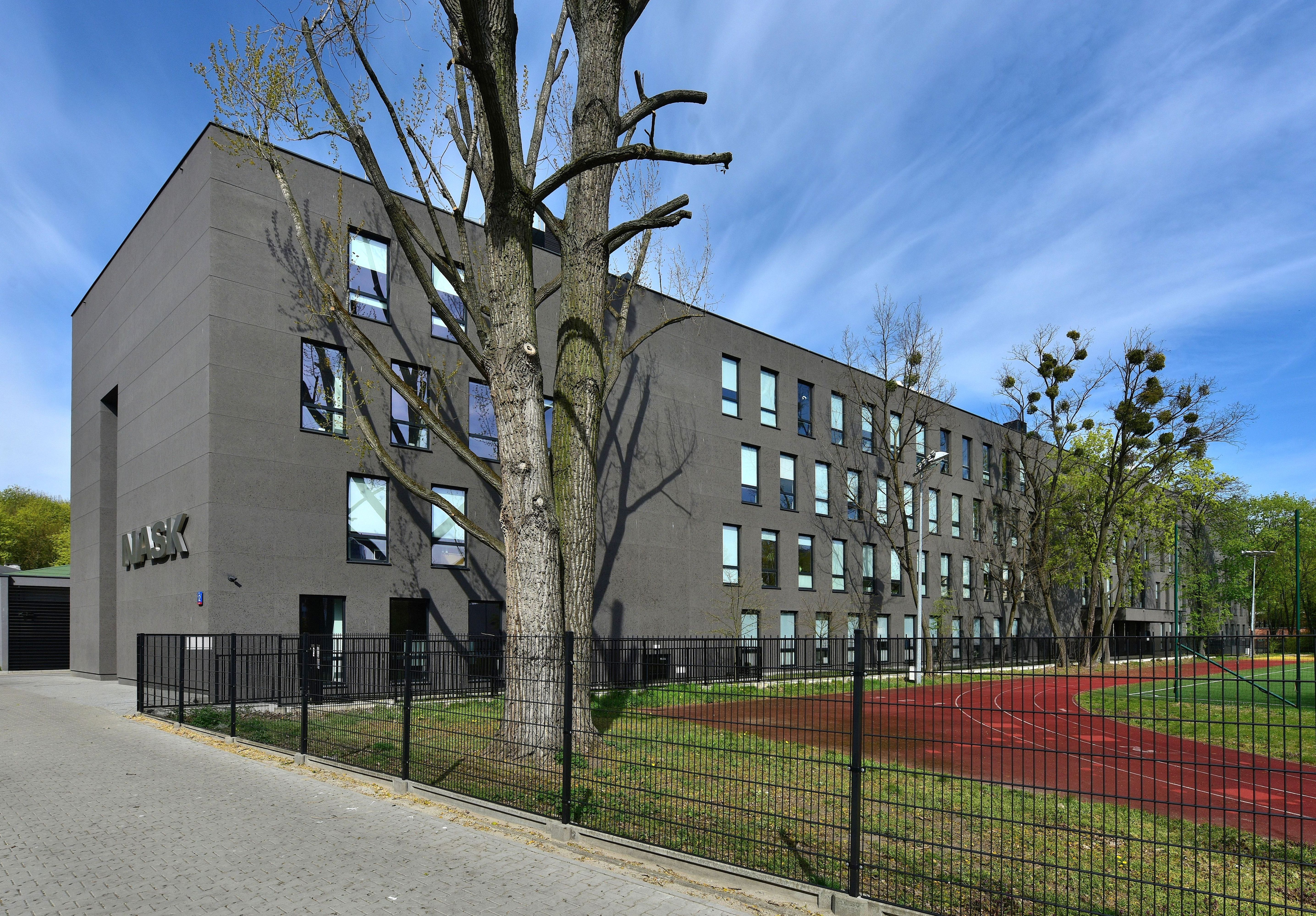
- Headquarters at the NASK in Warsaw

Agency overview
- Formed: January 1, 1996
- Headquarters: Warsaw, Poland
- Website: cert.pl

CERT Polska is computer emergency response team which operates within the structures of Naukowa i Akademicka Sieć Komputerowa (Scientific and Academic Computer Network or NASK) – a research institute which conducts scientific activity, operates the national .pl domain registry and provides advanced IT network services. CERT Polska is the first Polish computer emergency response team. Active since 1996 in the environment of response teams, it became a recognised and experienced entity in the field of computer security. Since its launch, the core of the team's activity has been handling security incidents and cooperation with similar units worldwide. It also conducts extensive R&D into security topics.

In 1998, CERT Polska became a member of the Forum of Incident Response and Security Teams (FIRST), and since 2000 it has been a member of the working group of European response teams, TF-CSIRT, and is accredited by its Trusted Introducer service. In 2005 on the initiative of CERT Polska, a forum of Polish abuse teams was created - Abuse FORUM, while in 2010 CERT Polska joined Anti-Phishing Working Group, an association of companies and institutions which actively fight on-line crime.

The main tasks of CERT Polska include:

- registration and handling of network security incidents for Poland and the “.pl” domain name space;
- providing watch & warning services to Internet users in Poland;
- active response in case of direct threats to users;
- cooperation with other CERT teams in Poland and worldwide;
- participation in national and international projects related to IT security;
- research activity in relation to methods of detecting security incidents, analysis of malware, systems for exchanging information on threats;
- development of proprietary tools for detection, monitoring, analysis, and correlation of threat;
- regular publication of CERT Polska Report on security of Polish on-line resources;
- information/education activities aimed at increasing the awareness in relation to IT security;
- performing independent analyses and testing solutions related to IT security.
