= Netia =

Polish telecommunications company

Netia S.A.
- Industry: Telecommunications
- Founded: 1990 (as R.P. Telekom Sp. z o.o.)
- Headquarters: Poland
- Area served: Poland
- Key people: Andrzej Abramczuk (president and CEO); Piotr Żak (chairman of the supervisory board)
- Number of employees: 2000
- Parent: Cyfrowy Polsat
- ASN: 12741
- Website: netia.pl

Netia is a telecommunications company which owns the second-largest fixed-line cable television and broadband network in Poland. The company was founded in 1990 and the following year was awarded its first concession to provide local telecommunications services in the city of Piła. Three years later, the company built and opened its own first network in the city of Świdnik. The company reached 100,000 subscribers in 1998, acquired its current name in April 1999 and was listed on the Warsaw Stock Exchange in 2000.

In the 2000s and early-2010s, Netia expanded through its numerous acquisitions of many regional cable television operators and telecommunications companies, such as the LMDS operator Pro Futuro in 2006, Tele2's Polish operations in 2008 and Telefonia Dialog in 2011.

In 2006, Novator Partners, a private equity investment firm domiciled in the United Kingdom and owned by Icelandic entrepreneur Björgólfur Thor Björgólfsson, acquired a large stake in Netia. In 2007, Netia and Novator announced that they were going to build a 4th mobile network in Poland.

In 2009, Novator sold its 30.3% stake in the company to financial investors in 28 transactions amounting to 590 million zlotys ($164 million). In 2015, Polish billionaire Zbigniew Jakubas bought an additional 7.8 percent of the company from MCI Management for 158 million zlotys ($42 million), raising his stake to 33.7 percent and making him Netia's largest shareholder. In 2018, Jakubas sold his entire share to Cyfrowy Polsat S.A, which then went on to acquire all remaining shares in Netia in 2021.
