= Plus (Polish telecommunications) =

Brand name of mobile phone network

Polkomtel Sp. z o.o.
- Wybierz swoje wszystko

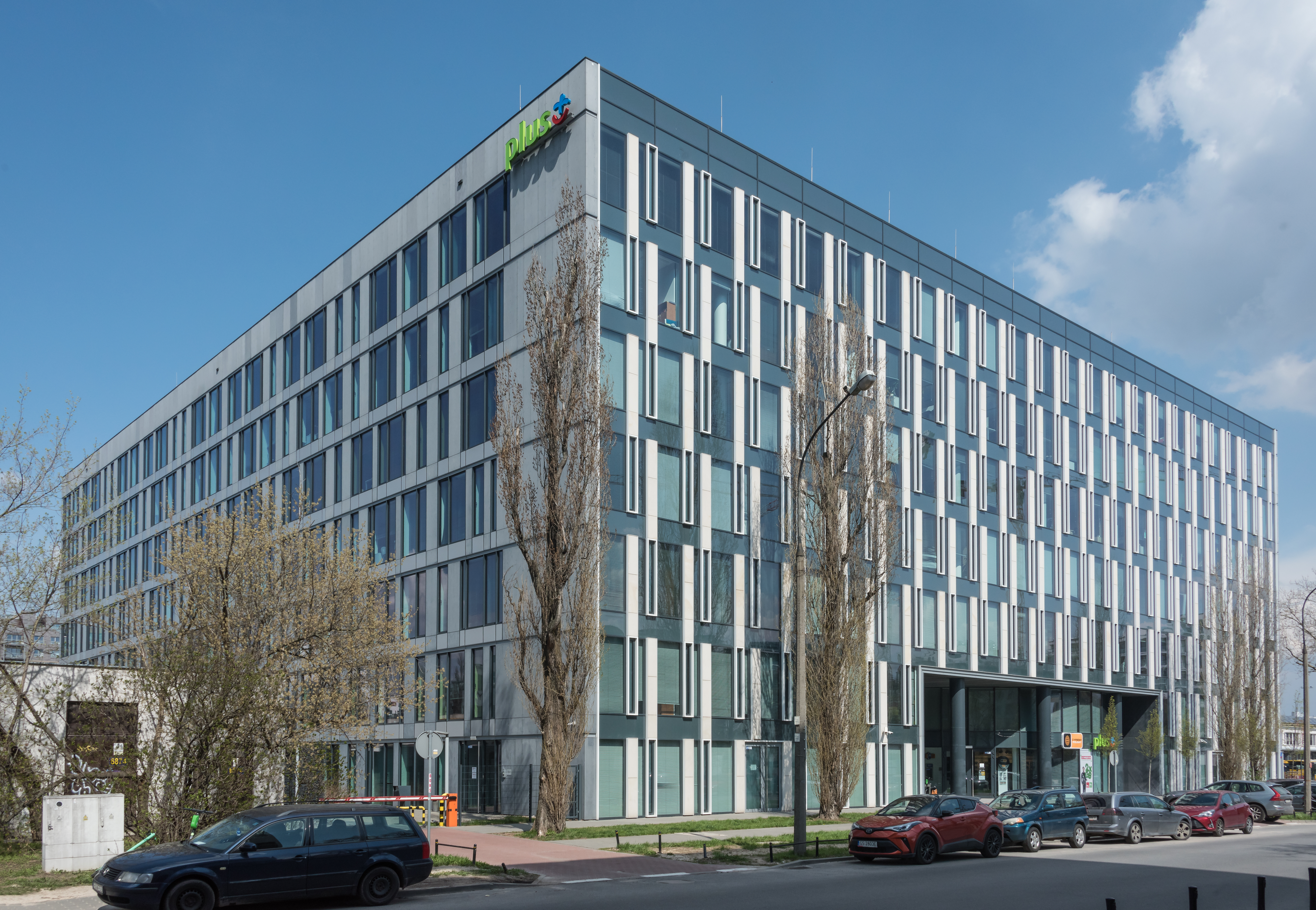
- Headquarters of Polkomtel in Służewiec, Warsaw
- Trade name: Plus
- Company type: Private
- Industry: Telecommunications
- Founded: 1995
- Headquarters: Warsaw, Poland
- Area served: Poland
- Key people: Mirosław Błaszczyk (CEO)
- Products: Fixed telephony Mobile telephony Broadband Internet; IT Services; IPTV
- Number of employees: 2,504 (2020)
- Parent: Cyfrowy Polsat S.A.
- Website: www.plus.pl

Plus (formerly Plus GSM) is the brand name of Poland's mobile phone network operator, Polkomtel Sp. z o.o. The company is entirely owned by Cyfrowy Polsat S.A. and is part of Grupa Polsat Plus. It operates GSM (900/1800 MHz), UMTS, LTE, 5G NR (2600 MHz TDD) and WLAN networks in Poland. It was founded in 1995.

From 1998 until 2002, Polkomtel used the Italian animated short cartoon La Linea to promote its Simplus prepaid service. From 13 May 2011, all of Polkomtel prepaid services are now called Plus na Kartę.

At the end of September 2021, Plus had 13.045 million active SIM cards, including 2.486 million (19%) using the prepaid system.

In July 2011, Zygmunt Solorz-Żak agreed to buy Polkomtel SA for 15.1 billion PLN ($5.5 billion).
