= Virgin Mobile Polska =

Polish mobile communications network

- Company type: Private
- Industry: Wireless communications
- Founded: August 22, 2012
- Area served: Poland
- Parent: P4 sp. z o.o. (Iliad SA)
- Website: www.virginmobile.pl

Virgin Mobile Poland is a provider of prepaid and postpaid wireless voice, text and data communications services throughout Poland. It launched on August 22, 2012. In September 2020 it was bought by the Polish telecommunications provider Play.

== Networks ==
Mobile services provided by Virgin use PLAY EGSM (1800 MHz), WCDMA (900 and 2100 MHz) and LTE (1800 and 2100 MHz) network (including domestic roaming T-Mobile).

== See also ==
- Play Mobile
- List of mobile network operators of Europe#Poland
