= Iliad Italia =

Italian telecommunications company

Iliad Italia S.p.A.
- Type: Subsidiary
- Industry: Telecommunications
- Founded: August 2, 2016; 10 years ago
- Founder: Xavier Niel
- Headquarters: Milan, Italy
- Area served: Italy
- Key people: Xavier Niel; Benedetto Levi
- Products: Mobile and fixed-line telephony
- Owner: Iliad (100%)
- Parent: Iliad
- Subsidiaries: Zefiro Net (50%)
- Website: www.iliad.it

Iliad Italia S.p.A. is an Italian telecommunications company, wholly-owned subsidiary of the French group Iliad SA

In December 2022, with 9.56 million active lines, it is the fourth largest mobile operator in Italy following Wind Tre, TIM and Vodafone.

== History ==
Iliad Italia S.p.A. was founded in 2016 as an Italian subsidiary of the French group Iliad In 2017, in view of the launch and in compliance with the provisions of the European Commission, the acquisition of the frequencies ceased by Wind Tre began following the merger of 3 Italy and Wind; as of 31 December 2017, Iliad has acquired almost 300 of the sites abandoned by Wind Tre, while the remaining will be transferred, according to the agreements, by the end of 2019.

The French holding said it would invest more than €1 billion for the launch and development of the new Italian mobile operator (including those to win the new 5G frequencies in Italy) with a thousand expected hires.

On 16 January 2018 the name of the Italian administrator of Iliad Italia, Benedetto Levi, was officially announced, together with the presentation of the new logo and the institutional Website. As part of the implementation of the infrastructures required to cover the Italian territory with its own network, on 16 February 2018, an agreement was reached with the Spanish group Cellnex, which provides Iliad Italia with over 7700 cellular antennas in Italy. Finally, on 29 May 2018, the official launch of the operator took place, in conjunction with the presentation of the commercial offer and the start of the sale of SIM cards with new numbers or to carry out the number portability from other phone operators. On 18 July 2018, just under two months after its launch, Iliad Italia officially announced that it had reached one million customers between requests for portability and new subscriptions. On 4 September 2018, the Iliad group releases the results of the first half of 2018, reporting the achievement – by early August – of one and a half million customers in Italy. On 6 September 2018, Iliad Italia issued a press release confirming the achievement of two million customers.

During the first semester of 2021, Iliad reached the break-even point and an EBITDA of 6 million euro, the first positive result since its foundation.

On 6 March 2020 Iliad Italia obtained general authorization from the Ministry of Economic Development for the provision of the telephone service accessible to the public. On 7 July 2020, the signing of an agreement was formalized thanks to which Iliad can operate in the fixed telephony market using the Open Fiber FTTH fiber-optic access network, which is accompanied by a similar agreement signed with Fastweb on 6 October 2022.

On 9 August 2021 Iliad became a partner of FiberCop, while on 25 January 2022 the FTTH fiber optic offer was officially launched, with overall speeds of up to 5 Gbps in download and 700 Mbps in upload for the areas covered by the technology EPON, and up to 2.5 Gbps in download and 500 Mbps in upload for the areas covered by GPON technology. The service is provided using the Open Fiber and FiberCop networks. The operator provides modem-routers on loan for use, called iliadboxes, designed by the company itself and based on the French freeboxes.

As of January 2023, its Italian mobile network counted about 16,200 active site nodes: the network is composed by an own-network of about 9,470 sites with another 6,730 sites in non-densely populated areas via an equal joint venture – namely, Zefiro Net – between Iliad Italia and Wind Tre.

== Simbox distributions ==
Iliad introduced the SIMboxes in Italy, a new type of sales point, conceived and created by the French group, Aures and already in use since 2014 on the French market by Free Mobile; these are SIM card vending machines, which allow customers to register and purchase it independently.

== Network ==
Iliad's 3G, 4G and 5G network is being implemented; however, the operator benefits from national coverage through an agreement with Wind Tre in RAN sharing (3G and 4G) and roaming (2G).

Iliad signed an agreement, respectively, with Cellnex (February 2018) and INWIT (February 2019) in order to install its antennas on their towers.

Iliad Italia is currently using, among others, CommScope telecommunications equipment and is collaborating with Cisco Systems (April 2019) and Nokia (September 2019) to implement a state-of-the-art national network (IPv6) in Italy based on segment routing (SRv6) and to achieve its 5G network.

== See also ==
- List of mobile network operators in Italy
