= Salt Mobile =

Swiss telecommunications company

Salt Mobile SA
- Formerly: Orange Communications SA/AG (1999–2015); Salt SA/AG (2015)
- Type: Private
- Industry: Telecommunications
- Founded: June 1999 in Prilly, Switzerland, as Orange Communications; Rebranded as Salt in 2015
- Headquarters: Prilly, Switzerland
- Area served: Switzerland
- Key people: Max Nunziata (CEO since June 1, 2023)
- Products: Mobile telephony; Fixed-line telephony; Fiber-optic broadband; Digital television
- Revenue: CHF 1.19 billion (2025)
- Number of employees: More than 1,000 (2025)
- Parent: NJJ Continental Holding (NJJ Holding)
- ASN: 15796
- Traffic Levels: 1-5 Tbps
- Website: salt.ch

Salt Mobile SA (formerly Orange Switzerland) is a Swiss telecommunications company based in Prilly, near Lausanne. It operates the third-largest mobile network in Switzerland, behind Swisscom and Sunrise, and since 2018 has also offered fiber-optic broadband, fixed-line telephony and television services.

Founded in 1999 as the Swiss subsidiary of Orange, the company was sold to Apax Partners in 2012, then acquired in 2015 by NJJ Holding, the personal holding company of the French businessman Xavier Niel, founder of Iliad, which renamed it Salt. In 2025, it had 1.86 million postpaid mobile subscribers and revenue of CHF 1.19 billion.

== History ==
=== Orange Switzerland (1999–2014) ===
Logo of Orange Switzerland (1999–2015)

The company was launched in June 1999 as Orange Communications, the third mobile operator in Switzerland. It was initially owned by Orange (42.5%), the German group VIAG, later part of E.ON (42.5%), the Banque Cantonale Vaudoise (10%) and Swissphone (5%). After France Télécom acquired Orange and bought out E.ON's stake, the French group held 85% of the company from 2000.

In April 2010, the Swiss competition authority WEKO blocked a planned merger between Orange and Sunrise. At the end of 2011, Orange agreed to sell the business to the British private equity firm Apax Partners for CHF 2 billion (€1.6 billion). The sale was approved by WEKO and completed in 2012, and the company continued to operate under the Orange brand under licence.

=== Acquisition by Xavier Niel and rebranding (2014–2015) ===
In December 2014, Xavier Niel agreed to buy Orange Switzerland from Apax through NJJ for CHF 2.8 billion, or €2.3 billion. After the Federal Communications Commission (ComCom) approved the transfer of the operating licence on February 12, 2015, the deal was completed on February 23, 2015. On April 23, 2015, the company was renamed Salt, and its shops closed until April 27 to change their signage.

=== Transformation and entry into fixed-line services (2015–2022) ===
The years after the takeover saw frequent changes of leadership. Chief executive Johan Andsjö left with immediate effect in December 2015. He was succeeded in March 2016 by Andreas Schönenberger, former head of Google Switzerland, who led the company's IT transformation, and in September 2018 by Pascal Grieder, a former McKinsey consultant, tasked with accelerating growth.

In March 2017, Salt paid NJJ an exceptional dividend of CHF 500 million, funded by CHF 100 million of cash and CHF 400 million of new debt. Analysts at CreditSights estimated that the operation raised the company's net debt to EBITDA ratio from 4.4 to 5.3 times.

On March 20, 2018, Salt returned to the fixed-line market, which it had left more than seven years earlier, with Salt Fiber, a fiber-optic broadband service with speeds of up to 10 Gbit/s, including telephony and television, offered with Swiss Fibre Net at prices up to 64% lower than those of its competitors. The package included an Apple TV 4K box.

In February 2019, Salt won 5G frequencies in the auction held by ComCom and began rolling out its network with Nokia. In May 2019, it sold most of its mobile towers to the Spanish group Cellnex Telecom, as part of a wider €2.7 billion agreement that also covered Iliad's towers in France and Italy.

=== Since 2023 ===
In February 2023, Pascal Grieder stepped down for personal reasons after nearly five years as chief executive. He was succeeded on June 1, 2023, by Max Nunziata, a Geneva-born engineer who had previously held senior roles at Sunrise and led the card provider Bonuscard, part of the Cornèr Bank group.

In 2025, Salt reported revenue of CHF 1.19 billion, up 4.4%, and EBITDAaL of CHF 514 million, up 8.8%. It added 110,000 postpaid mobile subscribers, for a total of 1.86 million, and 48,000 fixed-line customers, for a total of 313,000, and operated more than 110 shops. Like its competitors, it raised mobile prices by one to two francs a month in 2025 and again in June 2026, citing CHF 2.5 billion of investment in its network and services over the previous decade.

== Operations ==
At the end of 2018, Salt held 16.8% of the Swiss mobile market, behind Swisscom (58.3%) and Sunrise (24.9%). In early 2023, it reported population coverage of 99.9% and speeds of up to 750 Mbit/s by aggregating its 3G, 4G and 5G networks.

Besides its main brand, Salt markets mobile services under the GoMo, Lidl Connect and Post Mobile brands, and its network hosts several mobile virtual network operators, including VTX, iWay and Lycamobile.

== Ownership ==
Salt is owned by NJJ Continental Holding, part of Xavier Niel's NJJ Holding. In February 2021, the OpenLux investigation reported that NJJ controlled the operator through four companies based in Luxembourg.
