= Huawei U121 =

3G mobile camera phone

Vodafone 716 / Playset / Huawei U121
- Compatible networks: GPRS/GSM Tri-band 900/1800/1900, UMTS 2100
- Form factor: Candybar
- Dimensions: 103mm (L) × 45mm (W) × 14.5mm (H)
- Weight: ≤ 90g (with battery)
- Memory: 8 MB Internal and External microSD cards expandable up to 2 GB
- Battery: 800 mAh Li-ion
- Display: 1.8" TFT LCD, 262k colours
- Connectivity: mini-USB, Bluetooth Class 1.2 A2DP, GPRS

The Huawei U121, Playset and the Vodafone 716 are 3G mobile camera phones designed and manufactured by Chinese telecommunications equipment supplier Huawei. The phone is most common in its Vodafone UK form, where it was announced in 2008 and is branded as a Vodafone product, and sold as a budget pay-as-you-talk phone. It's also sold by Polish Play network as Playset.

== Features ==
The U121 features a 1.3 megapixel camera that supports video, a 3.5mm standard headphone port, video streaming and video calling, FM radio, a microSD slot, bluetooth, web and email, SMS and MMS, an MP3 player, a voice recorder, image editing, note writer, worldwide clock and numerous other common features.
