= Telecommunications in France =

Telecommunications in France are highly developed. France is served by an extensive system of automatic telephone exchanges connected by modern networks of fiber-optic cable, coaxial cable, microwave radio relay, and a domestic satellite system; cellular telephone service is widely available, expanding rapidly, and includes roaming service to foreign countries.

== Fixed-line telephony ==
The telephony system employs an extensive system of modern network elements such as digital telephone exchanges, mobile switching centres, media gateways and signalling gateways at the core, interconnected by a wide variety of transmission systems using fibre-optics or Microwave radio relay networks. The access network, which connects the subscriber to the core, is highly diversified with different copper-pair, optic-fibre and wireless technologies. The fixed-line telecommunications market is dominated by the former state-owned monopoly France Telecom.

As of 2009, France had 36.441 million main lines in use, with 35.5 million of those in metropolitan France.

=== International connection ===
Satellite earth stations – 2 Intelsat (with total of 5 antennas – 2 for Indian Ocean and 3 for Atlantic Ocean), NA Eutelsat, 1 Inmarsat (Atlantic Ocean region); HF radiotelephone communications with more than 20 countries

== Radio ==
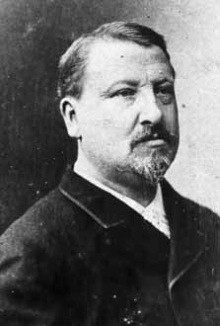
Ducretet was the first person to send radio transmissions in France.

French radio stations are licensed and regulated by the CSA, and public radio services are provided by Radio France.

== Television ==
Television in France was introduced in 1931, when the first experimental broadcasts began. Colour television was introduced in October 1967 on La Deuxième Chaîne.

== Internet ==
Internet in France has been available to the general public since 1994, but widespread Internet use did not take off until the mid-2000s. As of 31 December 2014, France had 26 million Internet broadband and high-speed connections on fixed networks. In 2014, 80.7% of French households (22.5 million households) had Internet access (47 million users in January 2015, according to Médiamétrie), while 19.3% did not (5.4 million households, out of a total of 27.8 million households).

In 2014, 82% of French people aged 12 and over had Internet access at home (even though only 77% used it), and 64% of French people aged 12 years and older connected daily to the Internet from home. Considering all connections locations (not only the home), 83% of French people were Internet users.

In metropolitan France, intense competition between Internet service providers has led to the introduction of moderately-priced high speed ADSL up to 28 Mbit/s (ATM), VDSL2 up to 100 Mbit/s, and FTTX up to 1 Gbit/s from €26 per month. They often include other services such as unlimited free VoIP telephone communications to land lines, and digital television. Dial-up internet access is considered outdated.

Since around 2003, quotas have been seen as outdated and consequently all the fixed broadband internet offers in France are unmetered.

== Mobile networks ==
France currently has 4 mobile networks, Orange, SFR, Bouygues Telecom and Free all of which are licensed for UMTS. All except Free are also licensed for GSM. In 2016 Q3, Orange had 28.966 million mobile phone customers, SFR had 14.577 million, Bouygues had 12.660 million, Free Mobile had 12.385 million, and the MVNOs had 7.281 million.

Before the launch of Free Mobile in January 2012, the number of physical mobile phone operators was very limited. For example, Sweden currently has 4 licensed operators with their own networks despite a smaller and sparser population than France's, making improved coverage less economically rewarding. However, France has a number of MVNOs which increases competition.

However, Free Mobile obtained its licence in December 2009 and operates since January 2012.

In France, the satellite telecommunications system TELECOM 1 (TC1) will provide high-speed, broadband transfer of digital data between different sections of subscribing companies. Conventional telecommunications links between continental France and its overseas departments will also be supplied.

== Overseas departments and regions ==
- Telecommunications in French Guiana
- Telecommunications in French Polynesia
- Telecommunications in Guadeloupe
- Telecommunications in New Caledonia
- Telecommunications in Saint Barthélemy
- Telecommunications in Saint Martin

== See also ==
- Censorship in France
- Media of France
- List of newspapers in France
- List of mobile network operators of Europe
- Autorité de Régulation des Communications Électroniques, des Postes et de la Distribution de la Presse
