= Iliad SA =

French telecommunications company

- Type: Private (Société anonyme)
- Traded as: Formerly Euronext: ILD (2004–2021)
- ISIN: FR0004035913
- Industry: Telecommunications
- Founded: 1991; 35 years ago
- Founder: Xavier Niel
- Headquarters: Paris, France
- Area served: France; Italy; Poland
- Key people: Xavier Niel (Chairman); Thomas Reynaud (CEO)
- Products: Fixed-line telephony, mobile telephony, broadband, IPTV, cloud computing
- Brands: Free, Free Mobile, Free Pro, iliad, Play, Scaleway
- Revenue: ▲€10.35 billion (2025)
- Net income: ▲€752 million (2025)
- Owner: Maya (Niel family), through Iliad Holding (98.88%)
- Number of employees: 18,132 (2025)
- Subsidiaries: Free; Free Mobile; Free Pro; Iliad Italia; Play; Scaleway
- Website: www.iliad.fr

Iliad SA, stylised as iliad, is a French telecommunications company headquartered in Paris. Founded by Xavier Niel, it operates fixed and mobile telephony, broadband and IPTV services in France under the Free and Free Mobile brands, in Italy under the iliad brand since 2018, and in Poland through Play, which it acquired in 2020. With 52 million subscribers across the three countries at the end of 2025, 42 million of them on mobile, the group describes itself as the fifth-largest telecommunications operator in Europe.

Iliad grew out of Minitel information services in the early 1990s and became known in France for disrupting the market on price: first with the Freebox, one of the first triple-play set-top boxes, launched in 2002 with broadband access at €29.99 a month, and then with Free Mobile, whose arrival in 2012 triggered a sharp fall in French mobile prices. The company was listed on the Paris stock exchange from 2004 until 2021, when Niel took it private; it is now controlled by Maya, the Niel family holding company, through Iliad Holding.

In 2025, Iliad reported revenue of €10.35 billion and net income from continuing operations of €752 million. Since the early 2020s it has diversified into cloud computing through Scaleway, into data centers and artificial intelligence, and has taken stakes in other operators, including Sweden's Tele2. In 2026 it agreed with Bouygues Telecom and Orange to acquire and divide up the French operator SFR, a deal subject to regulatory approval.

== History ==
=== Origins (1991–1999) ===
In 1991, Xavier Niel acquired Fermic Multimedia, a publisher of Minitel information services, and renamed it Iliad. The company later developed a reverse directory service, 3617 ANNU, which became one of the most profitable services on the Minitel network. In the mid-1990s Iliad moved into Internet access, connecting its Minitel services to the Internet through the provider Worldnet. In 1999, after obtaining operator licences to run its own telecommunications network, it founded the Internet service provider Free, whose service launched in April of that year.

In 2000, the investment bank Goldman Sachs acquired a minority stake of around 5% in Iliad for €15 million, which gave the young company credibility with investors and financed the build-out of its network.

At the same time, Niel began to structure the company and recruit a management team. The negotiations with Goldman Sachs were led for Iliad by Michaël Boukobza, later known as Michael Golan, a 21-year-old business graduate who had approached Niel in late 1999; he formally joined in January 2000 and served as chief executive from 2003 to 2007. A few months later, Boukobza met Olivier Rosenfeld, a Goldman Sachs banker based in New York, at a wedding and persuaded him to join the company; Rosenfeld became Iliad's first chief financial officer in 2001. When Boukobza stepped down in 2007, he was succeeded as chief executive by Maxime Lombardini, previously head of TF1 Production, who ran the group until 2018. Boukobza later founded the Israeli mobile operator Golan Telecom.

=== Free and the triple-play box (2000–2008) ===
In late 2002, Free launched a broadband offer at €29.99 a month, at a time when competing offers cost around €45. It came with the Freebox, a box designed in-house that combined Internet access, telephony and television in a single device, one of the first triple-play offers in the world. Free also began local loop unbundling in Paris, which it extended to France's main cities from 2003, becoming the country's second-largest DSL provider behind France Télécom, later renamed Orange.

Iliad was floated on the Paris stock exchange in early 2004. Its shares rose 35% on their first day of trading, in what was the first Internet initial public offering on the French market since 2000. In the following years Free introduced successive generations of the Freebox, adding Wi-Fi, high-definition television and a hard-disk video recorder, and in 2007 it began rolling out fibre to the home in Paris at the same price as its DSL offer.

In August 2008, Iliad completed its first large acquisition, buying the French broadband business of Telecom Italia, which operated under the Alice brand, for €775 million. With nearly four million subscribers, the group became the second-largest broadband provider in France. The Alice brand was later phased out and its customers transferred to Free.

=== Free Mobile (2009–2017) ===
In December 2009, the French telecoms regulator Arcep awarded Iliad's subsidiary Free Mobile the country's fourth 3G mobile licence, after Orange, SFR and Bouygues Telecom. Free promised to halve the average French mobile bill. Free Mobile launched its services in January 2012 with an unlimited calls and texts plan at €19.99 a month without a contract, and a basic plan at €2 a month, well below the prices then charged by the three incumbents; it initially relied on Orange's network for much of its coverage. The launch forced its competitors to cut their prices, and by the end of 2013 Free Mobile had become France's fourth-largest mobile operator, with a market share of about 12%.

Iliad also attempted to expand into the United States. On 1 August 2014, it made an offer of US$16 billion for a 56% stake in T-Mobile US, at a time when Sprint Corporation, owned by Japan's SoftBank, was also preparing a bid. Iliad abandoned the plan in October 2014.

Separately, Niel built up a portfolio of foreign operators through his personal holding company, NJJ, which are not part of the Iliad group. Iliad joined some of these investments: in December 2017 it agreed to acquire, alongside NJJ, a stake in the Irish incumbent Eir, in which it holds an indirect interest of about 32%.

=== European expansion (2018–2021) ===
In May 2018, chief financial officer Thomas Reynaud was appointed chief executive officer, while Maxime Lombardini, who had run the group since 2007, became chairman of the board. Xavier Niel took over as chairman in March 2020, with Lombardini becoming vice-chairman.

On 29 May 2018, Iliad entered the Italian market as its fourth mobile network operator, alongside TIM, Vodafone Italia and Wind Tre, with an offer of €6 a month for 30 GB of data and unlimited calls and texts. Applying the Free Mobile model, Iliad Italia signed up one million customers in its first fifty days.

To fund its investments, Iliad sold most of its mobile towers in France and Italy to Cellnex Telecom in May 2019, in a deal covering about 5,700 towers in France and 2,200 in Italy, for which Iliad received €2 billion.

In September 2020, Iliad agreed to acquire Play, Poland's largest mobile operator by subscribers, for about US$4.2 billion, giving it a third European market. A year later, in September 2021, it added the cable operator UPC Poland, bought from Liberty Global for about €1.5 billion and later merged into Play, allowing the group to offer fixed and mobile bundles in Poland.

In July 2021, Niel offered to buy the 29% of Iliad he did not already own, in a deal worth about US$3.7 billion, and the company was delisted later that year.

=== Diversification (2022–present) ===
Iliad's revenue rose from €8.37 billion in 2022 to €9.24 billion in 2023, and passed the €10 billion mark for the first time in 2024. In February 2024, Freya Investissement, an investment vehicle jointly controlled by Iliad and NJJ, agreed to buy the 19.8% stake held by the Swedish investment company Kinnevik in Tele2, one of the leading operators in Sweden and the Baltic states, for SEK 13 billion. Thomas Reynaud subsequently became chairman of Tele2's board.

The group has also invested in cloud computing and artificial intelligence. In February 2025 it announced a plan to invest about €3 billion in AI, including €2.5 billion for its data centre subsidiary OpCore and €100 million for the non-profit research laboratory Kyutai, in addition to the computing capacity offered by Scaleway. To finance this expansion, Iliad sold a 50% stake in OpCore to the French infrastructure investor InfraVia; the transaction, announced in December 2024, closed in April 2025, with the aim of turning OpCore into a large independent European platform of hyperscale data centres. The disposal brought in about €440 million in cash and contributed to the rise in net income in 2025.

=== Acquisition of SFR (2025–present) ===
In October 2025, Iliad, Bouygues Telecom and Orange made a joint offer to Altice France for most of the telecommunications activities of SFR, France's second-largest operator; Altice rejected it, but talks resumed in early 2026. In June 2026, the three operators signed a memorandum of understanding to buy SFR for €20.35 billion including debt. Under the agreement, Bouygues Telecom would take about 52% of SFR's revenue base, Free about 27% and Orange about 21%, with parts of the networks and IT systems held jointly during a transition period. The deal, which would reduce the number of mobile network operators in France from four to three, is subject to review by competition authorities.

== Operations ==
=== France ===
In France, the group operates under the Free brand. At the end of 2025 it had 23.3 million subscribers, comprising 15.7 million mobile subscribers and 7.6 million fixed broadband subscribers, of whom 6.7 million were connected to fibre, a fibre adoption rate of 87.6%. The Freebox range of set-top boxes is designed by the group's subsidiary Freebox SAS. Business customers are served by Free Pro, created from the acquisition of the operator Jaguar Network in 2019.

=== Italy ===
Iliad Italia, launched in 2018, is Italy's fourth mobile network operator and also offers fibre broadband. Its subscriber base grew from 9.6 million at the end of 2022 to 13 million at the end of 2025, of which 12.6 million were mobile subscribers and about 500,000 fibre subscribers.

=== Poland ===
In Poland, the group operates Play, the country's largest mobile operator by subscribers, which has absorbed UPC Poland. At the end of 2025 the Polish business had 15.6 million subscribers, including 13.5 million active mobile subscribers and 1.7 million fixed broadband subscribers. Play also co-owns, with InfraVia, an open-access fibre network operator, Polski Światłowód Otwarty.

=== Cloud, data centres and artificial intelligence ===
The group's hosting business dates back to Online, a web host launched in 1999, which became Scaleway in 2020. Scaleway provides cloud computing services, dedicated servers and AI computing capacity, and in 2025 acquired the data platform company Saagie. The group's data centres were grouped into OpCore, which has been jointly owned with InfraVia since 2025. In 2025, Free became the first operator to offer its mobile subscribers a year of free access to the paid version of Le Chat, the assistant developed by the French start-up Mistral AI.

=== Other activities and investments ===
The group also operates the payment services provider Stancer and the cybersecurity company Itrust, and retains the reverse directory service Annu. Outside its three main markets, it holds an indirect stake of about 32% in Eir in Ireland, alongside NJJ, and, through Freya Investissement, 19.8% of Tele2.

The group is also closely linked to Millicom, which provides mobile and fixed broadband services under the Tigo brand in nine Latin American countries. Niel's investment company Atlas Investissement, which sits outside the Iliad group, has built up a stake in Millicom since 2022; holding about 29% of its capital, it made a takeover offer for the company in July 2024. Iliad's vice-chairman, Maxime Lombardini, was appointed Millicom's chief operating officer in 2023 and became chairman of its board in 2025.

== Corporate affairs ==
=== Ownership ===
Since its delisting in 2021, Iliad has been controlled by Maya, the holding company of the Niel family, chaired by Xavier Niel. Maya owns Iliad through its subsidiary Iliad Holding, which held 98.88% of Iliad's capital at the end of 2025; the remainder was held by minority shareholders (0.73%) and as treasury shares (0.39%).

=== Management and governance ===
Iliad is led by chief executive Thomas Reynaud, with Aude Durand as deputy chief executive. Its board of directors, chaired by Xavier Niel, has eleven members, including four independent directors and two employee representatives; Maxime Lombardini is vice-chairman. Each of the main subsidiaries has its own management: Nicolas Thomas heads Free, Benedetto Levi has led Iliad Italia since its launch, and Ken Campbell is chief executive of Play.

=== Business trends ===
The key trends for the Iliad group are (as of the financial year ending 31 December):

Year	Revenue (€ bn)	Net income (€ m)	Employees
2019	5.33	1,726 (Note: Including the capital gain on the sale of mobile towers to Cellnex.)	11,099
2020	5.87	420	14,722
2021	7.59	526	15,079
2022	8.37	758	16,724
2023	9.24	318	17,872
2024	10.02	367	18,411
2025	10.35	752	18,132

Employee numbers are at year end.

== See also ==
- Telecommunications in France
- Telecommunications in Italy
- Telecommunications in Poland
