= TikTok USDS =

American technology company

TikTok USDS JV

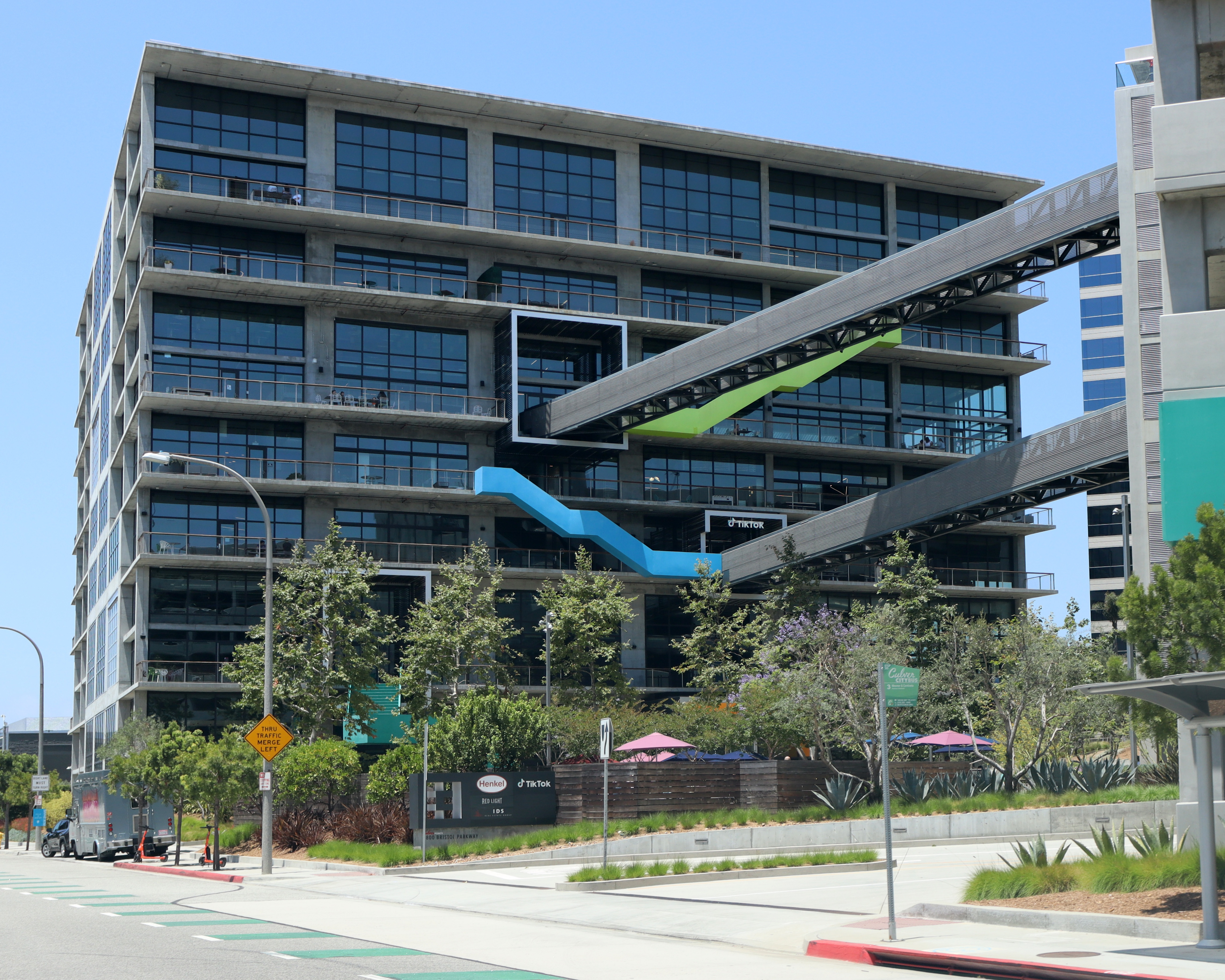
- TikTok's headquarters in Culver City, California
- Type: Joint venture
- Industry: Social media service
- Founded: January 22, 2026; 9 months ago
- Headquarters: Culver City, California, U.S.
- Area served: United States
- Key people: Adam Presser (CEO); Will Farrell (CSO)
- Owner: ByteDance (19.9%); Oracle Corporation (15%); MGX Fund Management Limited (15%); Silver Lake (15%)
- ASN: 11983
- Website: usdsjv.tiktok.com

TikTok U.S. Data Security Joint Venture LLC is a multinational technology company established in January 2026 to oversee TikTok's operations in the United States. It was formed to address U.S. national security concerns regarding potential access by the Chinese government through ByteDance.

== History ==
=== Negotiations ===
In 2024, the United States Congress passed the Protecting Americans from Foreign Adversary Controlled Applications Act, a law that required services defined as a "foreign adversary controlled application"—including those operated by ByteDance, explicitly named in the law—to be rendered inoperable unless the application is divested. Three days before Donald Trump's second inauguration in January 2025, the Supreme Court ruled in TikTok, Inc. v. Garland that the law was constitutional. The following day, TikTok ceased operating in the United States with a messaging reserving that Trump had "indicated that he will work with us on a solution". TikTok gradually returned after Trump publicly stated he would delay enforcement of the ban; Trump's initial actions included an executive order directing his attorney general not to enforce the law. Additionally, Trump threatened to impose tariffs on China if the country's government failed to agree to sell at least fifty percent of TikTok to an American company. That month, NPR reported that a consortium of investors, including Oracle and Microsoft, were working with the Trump administration on an acquisition plan for TikTok. Microsoft's intentions were publicly confirmed by Trump.

The process garnered attention from other American investors. A consortium led by the Employer.com founder Jesse Tinsley and composed of the YouTuber MrBeast; David Baszucki, the co-founder and chief executive of Roblox; and Nathan McCauley, the co-founder and chief executive of Anchorage Digital was said by Tinsley to have exceeded a rival offer of US$20 billion, ostensibly in reference to Project Liberty's effort to acquire TikTok, organized by Frank McCourt and Kevin O'Leary. Trump's initial comments offered several opposing perspectives, including that a bidding war should occur, that the United States government should own a percentage of the resulting company, and that Microsoft and Elon Musk were potential buyers.

=== Establishment ===
On January 22, 2026, TikTok stated that ByteDance had reached an agreement to establish an American version of TikTok. As part of the agreement, the new company is to pay US$10 billion to the Trump administration. Reporters and commentators have pointed out that the sale of TikTok's US operations to a group of Trump allies furthers the administration's control and influence over US media, and is part of a pattern that includes other acquisitions favoring Trump allies and intimidation of media outlets.

== Operations and technology ==
TikTok USDS assumed control of TikTok in the United States after its establishment. Its privacy policy was changed to permit the company to track users's precise location, monitor their interactions with artificial intelligence, and provide collected information outside of TikTok. TikTok experienced a large outage several days after the establishment of TikTok USDS; the company attributed the issue to a power outage at a data center located within the United States.

== Corporate affairs ==
=== Ownership ===
A consortium led by Oracle, MGX Fund Management Limited, and Silver Lake each acquired a fifteen percent share in TikTok USDS, while an additional five percent comprise other investors. The remaining fifty percent is held by "affiliates of certain existing investors of ByteDance" and by ByteDance itself. The investors include Michael Dell's family office, DFO Management; Vastmere Strategic Investments, an affiliate of Susquehanna International Group; Alpha Wave Partners; Revolution; Merritt Way, a subsidiary of Dragoneer Investment Group; Via Nova, an affiliate of General Atlantic; Virgo LI, the investment company operated by a foundation established by Yuri and Julia Milner; and NJJ Capital, Xavier Niel's family office.

The joint venture's announcement lists the following investors:

- Managing investors, each holding 15%:
  - Silver Lake
  - Oracle
  - MGX
- Other investors:
  - Dell Family Office, the investment firm of Michael Dell
  - Vastmere Strategic Investments, LLC, an affiliate of Susquehanna International Group
  - Alpha Wave Partners
  - Revolution
  - Merritt Way, LLC, controlled and managed by partners of Dragoneer
  - Via Nova, an affiliate of General Atlantic
  - Virgo LI, Inc., the investment arm of a foundation set up by Yuri and Julia Milner
  - NJJ Capital, the family office of Xavier Niel
- ByteDance, which retains a 19.9% stake

=== Executives and board ===
In January 2026, ByteDance named Adam Presser, TikTok's head of operations and the former chief of staff to chief executive Shou Zi Chew, as the chief executive of TikTok USDS. Will Farrell was named as its chief security officer.

TikTok USDS's board of directors include Chew; Egon Durban, a co-chief executive of Silver Lake; Mark Dooley, a managing director of Susquehanna International Group; Timothy Dattels, a senior advisor to TPG Inc.; Raul Fernandez, the chief executive of DXC Technology; Kenneth Glueck, an executive vice president at Oracle; and David Scott, the chief strategy and safety officer of MGX.
