= Scaleway =

French cloud computing company

- Scaleway logo
- Formerly: Online SAS
- Industry: data processing, hosting and related activities
- Founded: 30 August 2000
- Founder: Xavier Niel
- Headquarters: 8th arrondissement of Paris, France
- Key people: Aude Durand (chairperson); Damien Lucas (CEO); Jean-Baptiste Kempf (CTO)
- Products: Cloud computing, Dedicated Servers, Web Hosting
- Revenue: 40,659,303 euro (2015)
- Net income: 1,025,254 euro (2015)
- Number of employees: 550
- ASN: 12876
- Website: www.scaleway.com

Scaleway (formerly Online SAS or Online.net) is a French cloud computing and web hosting company, founded by Xavier Niel in 1999 and a majority owned subsidiary of the Iliad group. The company provides physical dedicated servers and cloud computing architectures.

As of 2015, Scaleway is the second largest hosting company in France.

== History ==
In 1999, Online started its activities in web hosting and domain name registration services

In August 2002, the domain name registrar BookMyName was bought by Iliad from its competitor LDCom.

In May 2006, rental of dedicated servers through the Dedibox brand was launched.

In December 2008, Iliad bought Alice ADSL: They also took over construction and operation of Datacenters, launched in 1999 by ISDnet, bought by Cable & Wireless in January 2000 acquired by Tiscali France in June 2003 and finally renamed as Iliad Datacenter.

In April 2010, Online merges with Dedibox, another subsidiary of Iliad, bringing together different hosting activities under a single brand.

In 2012, the company has opened its third datacenter of 11800 m² in Vitry-sur-Seine after 11 months of construction works. The site received the first Tier-III certification in France by Uptime Institute in January 2014.

Since 2012, the company has published its datacenters' PUE in real time on pue.online.net.

In 2013, Online launched labs.online.net in preview. An infrastructure as a service offer, based on dedicated hardware and without virtualization, based on ARM CPUs. The hardware is made in a factory near Laval in France.

In April 2015 the service left its beta status and has been renamed as Scaleway. Online added servers with x86_64 based CPUs in March 2016.

Entrepreneur Yann Lechelle joined as CEO in early 2020, but left in December 2022.

In November 2023, Iliad launched Kyutai in France, an independent, non-profit artificial intelligence research laboratory operating on an open-source and open-science basis, funded with 300 million Euro.

According to Euractiv, the European Commission has been in talks for several weeks about European cloud providers as alternatives to Microsoft, including Scaleway. In April 2026, the European Commission selected Scaleway as one of four providers under its Cloud III Dynamic Purchasing System, a €180 million framework for EU institutions to procure sovereign cloud and AI services over up to six years.

In July 2026, Airbus signed a multi-year agreement with Scaleway to host sensitive industrial and defence applications, including systems for aircraft design, engineering, manufacturing and corporate operations. Scaleway also signed partnerships with Swedish operator Tele2 to launch a sovereign cloud and AI offering in Sweden, and with France Télévisions to host and process content-related data.

== Infrastructure ==
=== Datacenters ===
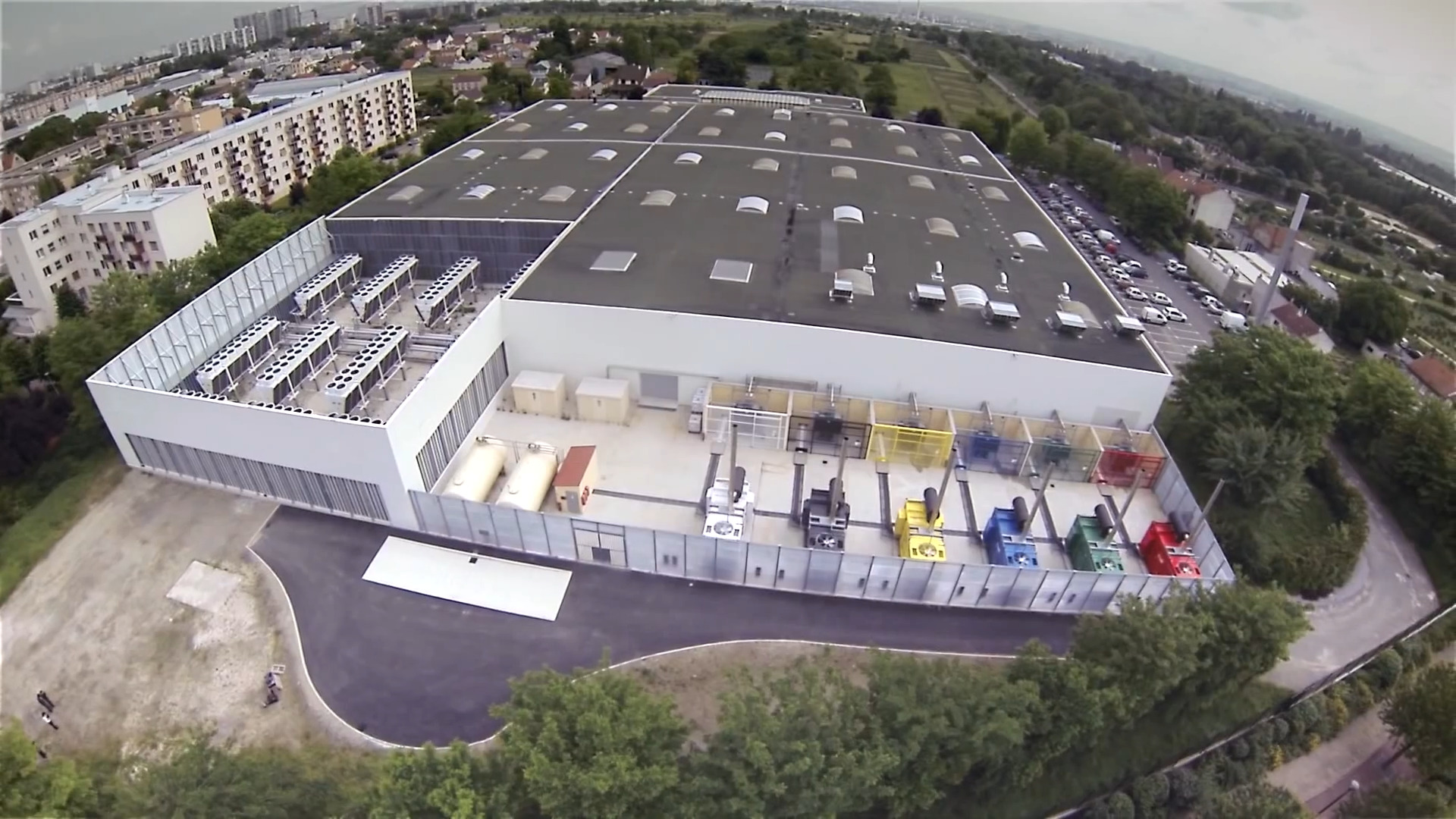
Aerial view of Online DC3.

Scaleway owns and operates several data centers located in Île-de-France.

- DC2, with a size of 4,500 m² in Vitry-sur-Seine, within the Val-de-Marne. The building has been constructed in 1989 by NMPP (Presstalis), then successively taken over by ISDNet, Cable & Wireless, Tiscali, then Telecom Italia, and is therefore an indirect product of the acquisition of Alice ADSL by Iliad.
- DC3, with a size of 11,800 m² in the same city is divided into several private spaces. It was built in 2012 by the group. It has reached its capacity in early 2016 and works have been planned to extend its capacity by 2,300 m2.
- DC4, with a size of 8,000 m² on six floors in the 15th arrondissement of Paris, housed in the former anti-atomic fallout shelter of the "Laboratoire central des ponts et chaussées". It was built between 1936 and 1939 by architect Gabriel Héraud, the building was acquired by Iliad in 2011. The main part of the fallout shelter is being used for the C14 offer.
- DC5, with a size of 32,000 m² on four floors at Saint-Ouen-l'Aumône. It is the result of the acquisition of an old mail sorting center of La Poste, and will handle the growth from 2017-2025 of the hoster.

In the past the company operated also:

- DC1, with a size of 6300 m² in Bezons, which also hosts the network head of Free. Built in 2001 by the American company Exodus Communications then taken back by Spherion, after the bankruptcy of the company. It is leased to Iliad on a long-term contract since 2003 This site does not host any activities of Online since 2013.
