= Telecommunications in Guadeloupe =

Telecommunications in Guadeloupe refer to telephony, Internet, broadcasting, and related infrastructure in the French overseas department of Guadeloupe. As an overseas territory of France, Guadeloupe follows French telecommunications law and regulation under the authority of the regulator ARCEP (Autorité de régulation des communications électroniques, des postes et de la distribution de la presse).

== Regulation ==
Telecommunications are regulated by ARCEP, which oversees all French territories. In 2024 ARCEP launched procedures for awarding frequencies in the 700 MHz, 900 MHz and 3.4-3.8 GHz bands for operators including Digicel AFG, Free Caraïbe, Orange and Outremer Telecom. Licenses were awarded in February 2025. ARCEP also performs quality-of-service audits. In 2024 it made over 528,000 measurements in Guadeloupe.

== Infrastructure ==
=== Mobile networks ===
Mobile service is provided by Orange Caraïbes, Outremer Telecom, Free Caraïbe and Digicel AFG. Coverage for 2G, 3G, 4G and 5G networks is widespread, with Orange ranked highest for quality-of-service in 2024.

=== Fixed broadband ===
High-speed Internet access is provided mainly by Orange Caraïbes, Outremer Telecom and Mediaserv. In 2019 there were about 170,000 broadband subscriptions. nPerf's 2024 broadband ranking placed Orange and SFR Caraïbe among the top performers.

== Domain name ==
Guadeloupe has its own domain name: .gp.

== Radio ==
There are 35 radio stations emitting in Guadeloupe. In 1997, there were 113,000 radio sets in the region.

== Television ==
There are 10 TV stations emitting in Guadeloupe using digital terrestrial television, including 4 local stations.

In 1997, there were 118,000 television sets in Guadeloupe.

== See also ==
- Guadeloupe
- Telecommunications in French Guiana
