= NJJ Holding =

French holding company

NJJ
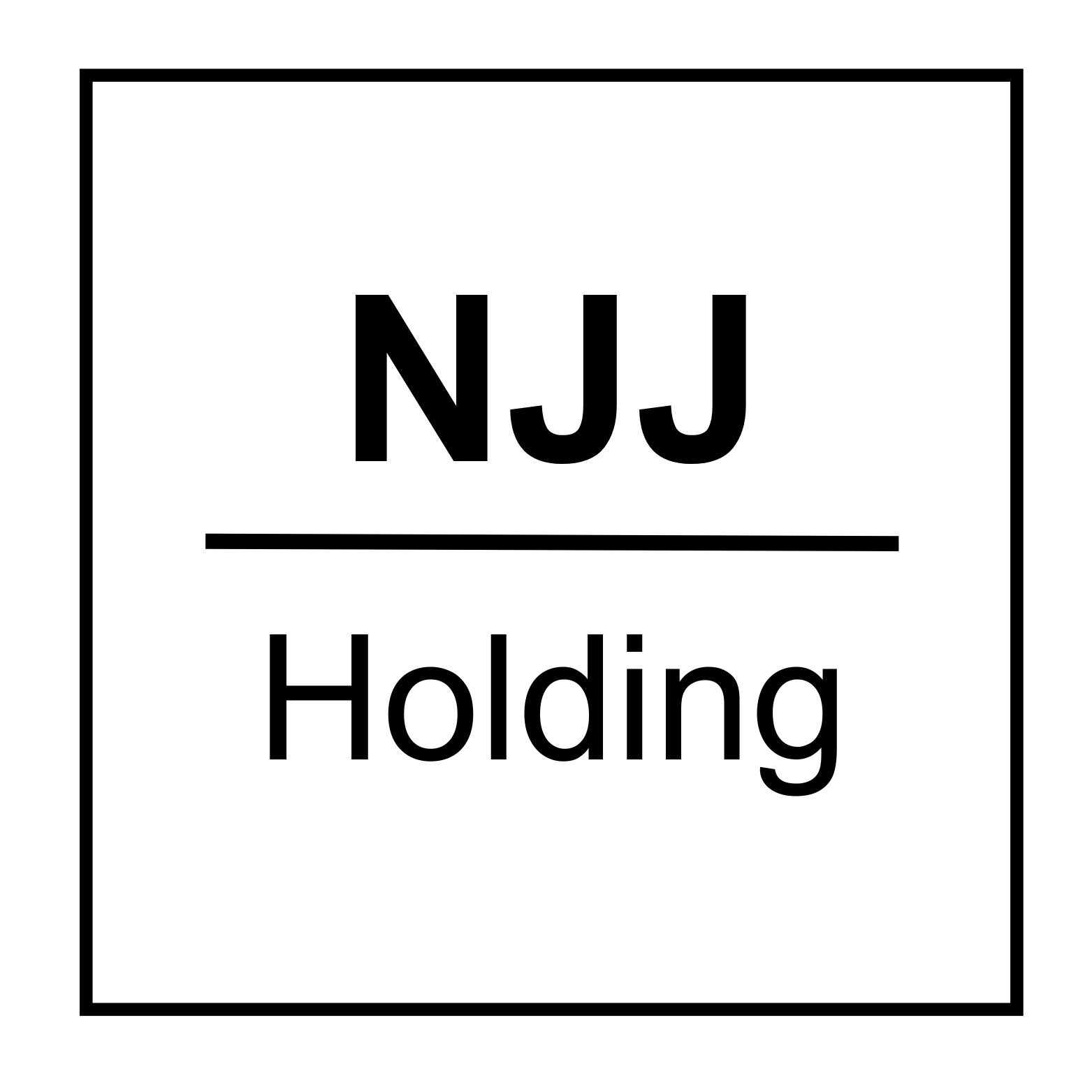
- Type: Private
- Industry: Holding company
- Founded: 2010; 16 years ago
- Founder: Xavier Niel
- Headquarters: Paris, France
- Key people: Anthony Maarek (CEO)
- Owner: Xavier Niel
- Subsidiaries: Salt Mobile; Eir; Unibail-Rodamco-Westfield

NJJ is a French holding company controlled by Xavier Niel that owns numerous companies. The company's main activities are in telecommunications, real estate and the press, notably through its stakes in Salt Mobile, Eir, Unibail-Rodamco-Westfield and Nice-Matin.

The holding company, which takes its name from “Niel John Jules”, the two given names of Xavier Niel's sons, has numerous subsidiaries - at least 25 at one time.

== Holdings ==
- Monaco Telecom in Monaco, Cyprus and Malta (55%), acquired in 2014
- Salt in Switzerland (100%), acquired in 2014
- Eir in Ireland (32.9%), acquired in 2017. Iliad, another Xavier Niel company, has held an additional 31.6% since 2017
- Yas Senegal (40%), acquired in 2018 and sold in 2023 to Axian Telecom
- Millicom in Latin America (40%), partially acquired in 2022 and additional shares in 2023 and 2024
- Proximus in Belgium (6%), acquired in 2023
- Datagroup-Volia-Lifecell in Ukraine (85%), acquired in 2024
- Unibail-Rodamco-Westfield (25.5%), acquired in 2020
- Groupe Le Monde, partially acquired in 2010 then additional shares in 2023
- TikTok USDS, a minority stake acquired in 2026
