= Marco Patuano =

Italian economist and manager (born 1964)

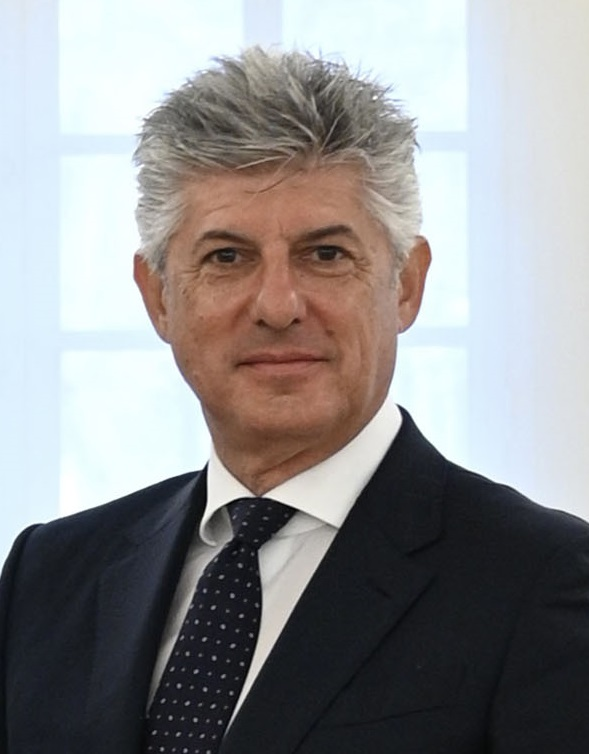
- Born: Marco Patuano; 6 June 1964 (age 62); Alessandria, Italy
- Occupations: Economist; manager
- Title: President of A2A; Strategic Advisor of Digital Value; Senior Advisor of Nomura; Board Member of Telit and AC Milan
- Children: 3

Marco Patuano (born 6 June 1964) is an Italian business executive who has been CEO of Cellnex Telecom since June 2023. He has also chaired the European Wireless Infrastructure Association (EWIA) since September 2024.

== Education ==
Patuano studied Corporate Finance and graduated from Bocconi University, in Milan, Italy, in 1990. He then proceeded his studies with numerous post-graduate specializations. Over time he maintained a good relationship with Italian universities, collaborating on MBA programs with Bocconi University of Milan and Luiss University of Rome.

== Career ==
=== Telecom Italia ===
Patuano began his career in SIP, the former name of Telecom Italia in 1990 working in the financial branch of the company. He helped to create the branch Telecom Italia Mobile in 1996. Marco Patuano's was nominated TIM Brasil CFO and Telecom Italia America Latina S.A. CFO, they are both Telecom Italia subsidiaries. He was nominated Telecom Italia CFO in 2008 and appointed Group CEO in 2011.

During his time at Telecom Italia, Patuano also joined the council of Confindustria in May 2013.

On 14 April 2017, he became a director of A.C. Milan. In 2019, he became a senior advisor of Nomura's European investment banking business.

=== Edizione Holding ===
On the 7 October 2016 he was nominated as CEO of Edizione srl, financial holding of the Benetton Family, which he then guides up to June 2019, when his natural mandate expired. Throughout the three years of guiding the company the group carries out many international operations within M&A, reducing its portfolio of investments in Italy from 74% to 39% and diversifying it. In the period in question, 2.4 Bln € were invested, with a MAV growth equal to 1.5 Bln €.

Simultaneously on the 14th of April, 2017 Patuano enters in the board of directors of AC Milan, after the change of ownership from Fininvest to Li. Yonghong. In 2018, with the enforcement of the pledge by Elliott on AC Milan and the subsequent change of ownership, Patuano is confirmed within the board.

In July 2018, he was appointed non-executive chairman of Cellnex Telecom as a proprietary director representing Edizione.

During his time leading Edizione, he sat on the boards of directors of several of the holding’s portfolio companies, including Autogrill and Atlantia, as well as Benetton Group. He remained in the role of CEO until 2019.

=== Advisory and board roles ===
Patuano joined the board of director of AC Milan in Aprin 2017, a position he held until 2022.

In September 2019, Patuano founds a new holding for consulting and investing called "MP Invest". The Social objective of MP Invest is to "consult financially, directionally, organizationally and management, with a main focus on the financial, industrial, infrastructural, media and technologies sectors". The company exerts also activities of holding acquisitions and management of participations. The main client base are companies and hedge funds of private equity, whom they support and help individuate investment opportunities.

From 2019 to 2023, he was a senior adviser to Nomura for Italy and Europe, participating in mergers and acquisitions transactions.

Patuano covers or has covered also the following offices:

- Advisor for the Bocconi Foundation;
- Advisor for the Telecom Italia Foundation;
- Advisor for UPA since July 2012;
- Advisor for Olivetti;
- Advisor for AC Milan;
- President for the "Banco dell'Energia Onlus" since July 2020;

=== A2A ===
On May 13, 2020, he is nominated as President of the A2A Group, company listed on the Milan Stock Exchange, and vice-president of Utilitalia, the Italian federation of water, energy and environmental services companies.

=== Cellnex Telecom ===
On 28 April 2023, the board of directors of Cellnex Telecom agreed to propose Patuano as the company's new CEO, succeeding founding CEO Tobías Martínez, who had led the company since 2015. The appointment was approved by shareholders on 1 June and became effective on 4 June 2023.

In September 2024, Patuano was elected chair of the European Wireless Infrastructure Association (EWIA), the main European trade association for independent wholesale wireless infrastructure providers, succeeding Tobías Martínez in the role.

== Critics ==
In 2014 the company that he manages since 2011, Telecom Italia, has a consolidated net profit of 1 billion euros, an adjusted net financial debt of 26 billion euros, revenues for 21 billion euros and the EBIT amounted to 4 billion euros.

== Publications ==
- "Il confronto tra le Telco e gli OTT", published on the website ilpost.it.
- "Un nuovo modello di business per le telecomunicazioni", published on Harvard Business Review Italia and republished on Il Sole 24 Ore
