= Free Mobile =

French telecommunications company

Free Mobile S.A.S.
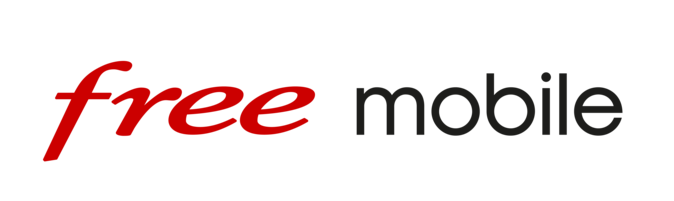
- Type: Subsidiary
- Industry: Telecommunications
- Founded: July 24, 2007; 19 years ago
- Founder: Xavier Niel
- Headquarters: Paris, France
- Area served: France
- Key people: Xavier Niel; Maxime Lombardini; Rani Assaf; Antoine Levavasseur
- Products: Mobile telephony
- Parent: Iliad
- Website: mobile.free.fr

Free Mobile S.A.S. is a French telecommunications company and subsidiary of Free S.A.S. that provides Wireless Internet to consumers in France. It was the fourth mobile network operator to obtain a metropolitan French 3G license in 2009. It also obtained a 4G license in 2011.

Free Mobile provides wireless services to 15.9 million subscribers as of September 2026.

== History ==
=== 3G license (900 MHz and 2100 MHz) ===
The first 3G licenses were awarded to France Telecom (now Orange) in 2000, SFR in 2000 and Bouygues Telecom in 2002. Free Mobile application has been agreed by French regulatory authority ARCEP on 17 December 2009. The license price is 240 million euros for two 5 MHz duplex bands in the 900 MHz and 2100 MHz frequency bands.

=== Roaming agreement ===
Free Mobile signed a 2G and 3G roaming agreement with Orange on 3 March 2011. It was initially set to run until 31 December 2020. It was extended for 2 more years, up to 31 December 2022, on 28 October 2020. The roaming agreement was again extended by 3 years, until 31 December 2025, on 27 July 2022. 100% of the 2G traffic will go through Orange's network as Free Mobile has no 2G license.

=== Network deployment ===
Free Mobile has for legal obligation to cover 27% of the French population by January 2012, 75% by January 2015 and 90% by January 2018.

Free Mobile was already covering 30% of the French population in November 2011. A 3G roaming agreement with Orange enables communications channeled through Orange's network, which covers about 98% of the French metropolitan population according to ARCEP.

Free Mobile was covering 37.3% of the French population in July 2012. Xavier Niel announced its network was covering 50% in January 2013. ARCEP confirmed that Free Mobile covered 78% of the population in January 2015.

An estimated 18,000 antennas, depending on the frequencies, are required to cover the whole French metropolitan area. Free Mobile operates roughly 21,600 3G antennas, 21,300 4G antennas and 13,500 5G antennas as of January 2022.

Number of 3G, 4G and 5G antennas in service (Source ANFR):

3G:

4G:

5G:

=== Service launch ===
ARCEP confirmed that Free covers enough of the country to open commercially and start using its roaming agreement with Orange. For the few first years Free will pay Orange to get a full national coverage, for the roaming license agreement as it arrived late to the mobile market.

Free Mobile launched its two offers on 10 January 2012. Both offers are without commitment and without subsidized phones.

=== 4G license (2600 MHz) ===
Free Mobile obtained a 4G license on 22 September 2011 for 271 million euros for a duplex 20 MHz band in the 2600 MHz frequency band. It failed to obtain further bands in the 800 MHz frequency band.

=== 4G launch ===
Xavier Niel announced on his Twitter account the availability of the 4G on 3 December 2013. 4G was added, at no additional cost, to the current commercial packages.

=== Additional 4G frequency bands (1800 MHz) ===
Free Mobile has been granted 15 MHz duplex bands in the 1800 MHz frequency band to balance with the licenses offered for free in this band to the other operators back in early 2000s. 5 MHz have been available between January and June 2015 and the remaining 10 MHz will be on 25 May 2016.

=== Additional 4G frequency bands (700 MHz) ===
The auction for the 700 MHz frequency band started on 16 November 2015. Initial bidding price was set at 416 million euros per 5 MHz duplex band. Six bands were for sale. The auction ended on 17 November 2015. Free mobile bought two bands (10 Mhz duplex) at 466 million euros (932 million euros).

=== 3G data roaming throttling ===
Free Mobile announced covering 85% of the population in 3G as of 1 July 2016. 3G data roaming throttling will be applied on Orange network:

Start date	Download limit	Upload limit
09/2016	5 Mbit/s	448 kbit/s
01/2017	1 Mbit/s	448 kbit/s
01/2019	768 kbit/s	384 kbit/s
01/2020	384 kbit/s	384 kbit/s

=== French overseas departments ===
Free Mobile was awarded frequencies in several French overseas departments and territories on 13 October 2016. Including Guadeloupe, French Guiana, Réunion, Martinique, Mayotte, Saint-Barthelemy and Saint-Martin.

=== Additional frequency bands (900 MHz and 2100 MHz) ===
Free Mobile benefited from a redistribution of the frequency bands among the 4 French mobile operators, following an agreement with the government on 23 October 2018 for providing coverage in the "white spots":

- Free Mobile will have 7.6 MHz in the 900 MHz range on 25 March 2021 then 8.7 MHz on 9 December 2024 (from the initial 5 MHz acquired in 2009).
- Free Mobile will have 14.8 MHz in the 2100 MHz range on 21 August 2021 (from the initial 5 MHz acquired in 2009).

=== 5G license (3.4-3.8 GHz) ===
Free Mobile obtained a 5G license on 1 October 2020 for 70 MHz in the 3.4-3.8 GHz range for 602 million euros.

=== 5G launch ===
Free Mobile started its 5G service on 15 December 2020. Free Mobile announced it in a humorous tweet with Xavier Niel.

== Customers ==
Free Mobile launched its two offers on 10 January 2012. The number of customers rose quickly in Q1 2012 and again in Q4 2012, after Free Mobile upgraded its €2.00 offer (from one hour/60 SMS to two hours/unlimited SMS) on 6 December 2012.

Number of customers (Source Iliad):

- Quarter gain
- Quarter loss

Free Mobile reached 5,205,000 customers, an 8% market share, in its first year (compared to 27.0 million mobile customers for Orange, 20.7 million for SFR and 11.3 million for Bouygues Télécom).

Free Mobile currently holds a 19% market share. Its long-term goal is a 25% market share.

== Frequency bands ==
Free Mobile uses the following frequency bands as of 2021:

Frequency bands	Technology	Band length
700 MHz	LTE	10 MHz duplex
800 MHz	-	-
900 MHz	UMTS	8.7 MHz duplex^{a}
1800 MHz	LTE	15 MHz duplex
2100 MHz	UMTS	14.8 MHz duplex^{b}
2600 MHz	LTE	20 MHz duplex
3.4-3.8 GHz	5G	70 MHz

- ^a (5 MHz in 2009 + 2.6 MHz in 2021 + 1.1 MHz in 2024)
- ^b (5 MHz in 2009 + 9.8 MHz in 2021)

== Volte and Vowifi ==
Due to frequency usages and network deployment, Free Mobile activated its Volte and Vowifi service in late 2021 as its competitors enabled it between 2015 and 2020. Free Mobile enabled its IMS service starting end of 2021. Several manufacturers, especially Samsung or Sony, refused then to update software of already sold devices, arguing only new sold models will be updated.

Free mobile is the only mobile phone operator to allow Vowifi calls from over the world, without any restriction, with no fees as if the call is located in France. Mostly, competitors (SFR, Orange or Bouygues Telecom) blocks Vowifi connections from outside of France.

== Outgoing calls from Roaming, to 08 destinations ==
Free mobile, in opposite of Orange, SFR and Bouygues Telecom, bills at €2 each minute of outgoing call from worldwide (including European Union) to French 08 numbers destined to specific services, even if those numbers do not bill the incoming call, Free Mobile bills them, exclusively outside of Metropolitan France. E.g. in France, calls to a 0800 up to 0809 are toll-free, but not 0810 to 0899, which are toll. In roaming abroad, Free Mobile bills all of them at €2 per minute, though competitors do not.

== See also ==
- Free (company)
- List of mobile network operators in Europe
- Telecommunications in France
- Golan Telecom
