= Jeremie Berrebi =

French-Israeli entrepreneur (born 1978)

- ג'רמי ברבי
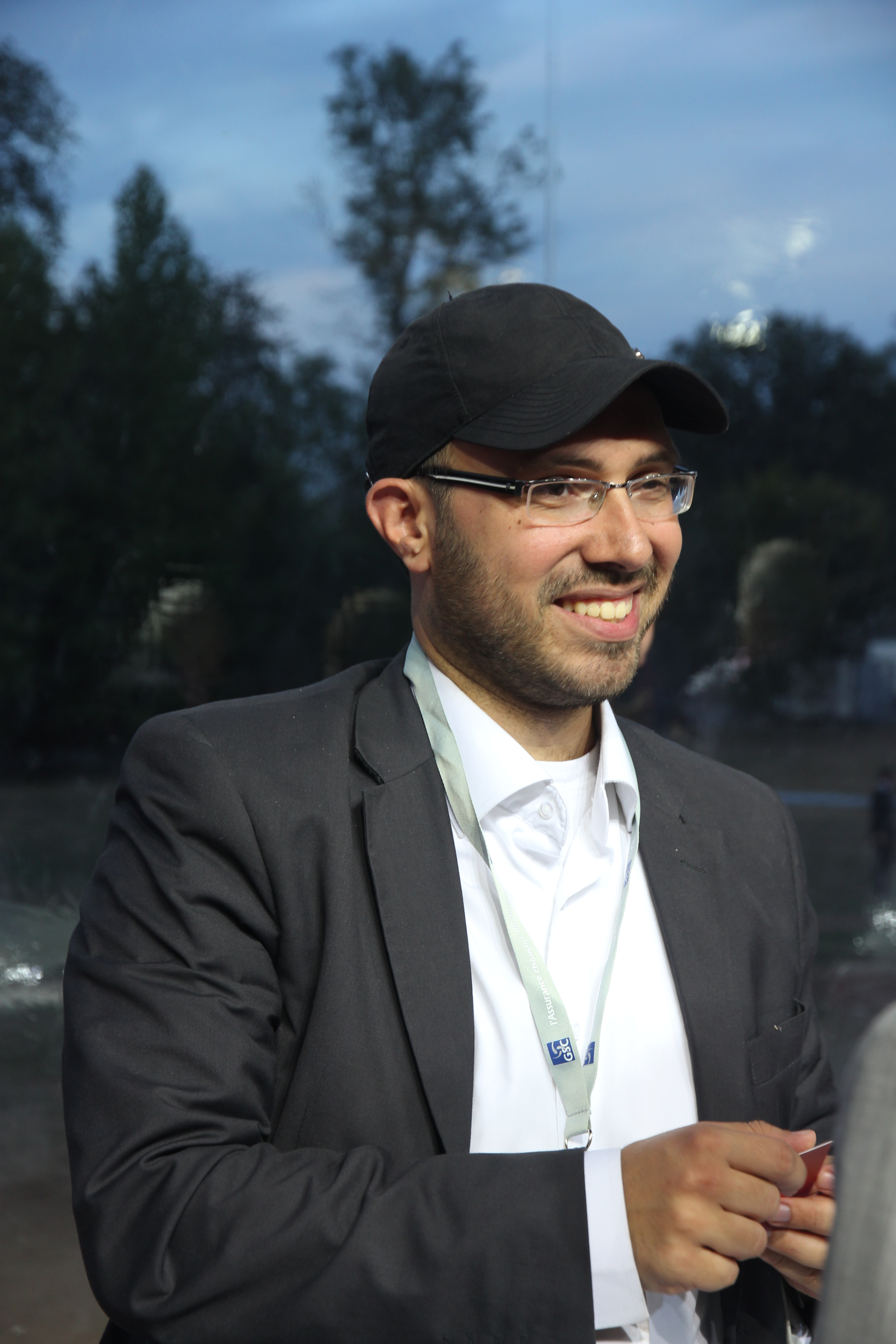
- Born: June 4, 1978 (age 48); Paris, France
- Occupations: Investor, Business Startup Advisor
- Years active: 1994–present
- Spouse: Rebecca
- Website: www.berrebi.org

Jeremie Berrebi (Hebrew: ג'רמי ברבי; born 4 June 1978) is a French-Israeli technology entrepreneur and investor.

== Biography ==
Jeremie Berrebi was the editor for ZDNet French in 1996, a technology news agency. In 1997 he co-founded Google news ancestor Net2one one of the first French internet news provider, later in 2004 Net2one sold to TNS Group (UK).

In March 2010 Berrebi co-founded with Xavier Niel Kima Ventures, a fund dedicated organization to invest in 50 to 100 startups a year everywhere in the world.

Berrebi is active in the investment, private equity and technology industries with more than 360 investments.

In May 2015, Berrebi announced his departure from Kima Ventures, the launch of Magical Capital, advising family offices and corporates on their investments, acquisitions and digital transformation and joined the LetterOne Technology advisory board that he left in April 2017.

== Awards and recognition ==
Berrebi won the Europas Prize of Best European Angel Investor in 2014.

== Public positions ==
- Developers Institute Tel Aviv Coding Bootcamp – Ranked as 2nd best coding bootcamp in English – Co-Founder and Strategic Advisory Board Member
- Magical Capital Founder and CEO
- Former LetterOne Technology Advisory Board member
- Co-founder at Kima Ventures.
- Founder of KoolAgency, a mobile and web development team.
- Former chairman of Zlio
- Business advisor and co-founder of Teliswitch, an Automated optical distribution frame (AODF) family
- Business advisor and co-founder of Leetchi, a group gifts and events, online money pots (sold to Credit Mutuel Arkea)
- Business advisor and co-founder of FreshPlanet, a social, casual gaming company developing online games for the iPad and Facebook (sold to Gameloft).
- Business advisor and co-founder of iAdvize, Real-time online customer service: live chat.
- Co-founder of 8-Sec
- Co-founder of Producteev, a Task Management Software (sold to Jive Software).
- Former CEO of Net2one (Sold to TNS in 2004)
- Former editor of ZDNet.fr
- Former CompuServe sysop
