= MGX Fund Management Limited =

Emirati AI investment company

- Type: Government-owned
- Industry: Artificial intelligence; Investment management
- Founded: 2024; 2 years ago
- Founder: Abu Dhabi Government
- Headquarters: Abu Dhabi
- Key people: Tahnoun bin Zayed Al Nahyan (chairman); Khaldoon Al Mubarak (vice chairman); Ahmed Yahia Al Idrissi (CEO)
- Website: mgx.ae

MGX Fund Management Limited (MGX) is an Emirati state-owned investment firm for artificial intelligence (AI) technologies. Established by the government of Abu Dhabi in 2024, MGX aims to become a vehicle for AI-driven investments with a target of managing US$100 billion in assets.

== History ==
MGX was established in 2024 by the government of Abu Dhabi to channel investments into AI-driven technologies and startups and to foster innovation and drive economic growth within the region. MGX was launched in March by two entities: global investment company Mubadala and an artificial intelligence firm G42. MGX's board chair is Sheikh Tahnoun bin Zayed Al Nahyan and Khaldoon Al Mubarak is the vice chair. In September 2024, MGX, BlackRock, and Microsoft announced the Global AI Infrastructure Investment Partnership, an AI investment fund that will focus on data centers and their power infrastructure.

In January 2025, MGX partnered with OpenAI, SoftBank, and Oracle on the Stargate Project. In March 2025, MGX made a minority investment in Binance, using World Liberty Financial's Stablecoin for the $2 billion investment. The transaction was announced by the Trump family, with The New York Times calling the announcement "a public and vivid illustration of the ethical conflicts swirling around Mr. Trump’s crypto firm."

MGX, as of July 2025, was working with Mistral and Nvidia to build the largest AI data center campus in Europe. MGX had announced in early 2025 that it planned to invest US$31.2 billion to US$52 billion in the new data center campus in France, to have a one-gigawatt capacity focused on AI.

On September 25, 2025, Trump approved a deal where TikTok in the United States would be controlled by a new US-controlled entity with Oracle, Silver Lake, and MGX collectively holding around 45% of the company and ByteDance retaining less than 20%. The new company TikTok USDS was established in January 2026.

In October 2025, a consortium involving MGX, AIP, and BlackRock's GIP agreed to acquired Aligned Data Centers for $40 billion from Macquarie Asset Management. It was reported as the largest global data center deal to date.

In June 2026, MGX raised close to $50 billion from regional and global investors for a fund to accelerate spending on AI infrastructure and technology.

== Operations ==
MGX operates primarily within the global AI technology sector, focusing on identifying and investing in high-potential AI startups and established companies and has AI ventures across North America, Europe, Asia, and the Middle East. Its website in 2025 described three related areas of focus with investments: semiconductor companies, AI infrastructure companies, and AI technology companies.
