= T-Mobile Polska =

Polish mobile phone network operator

T-Mobile Polska S.A.

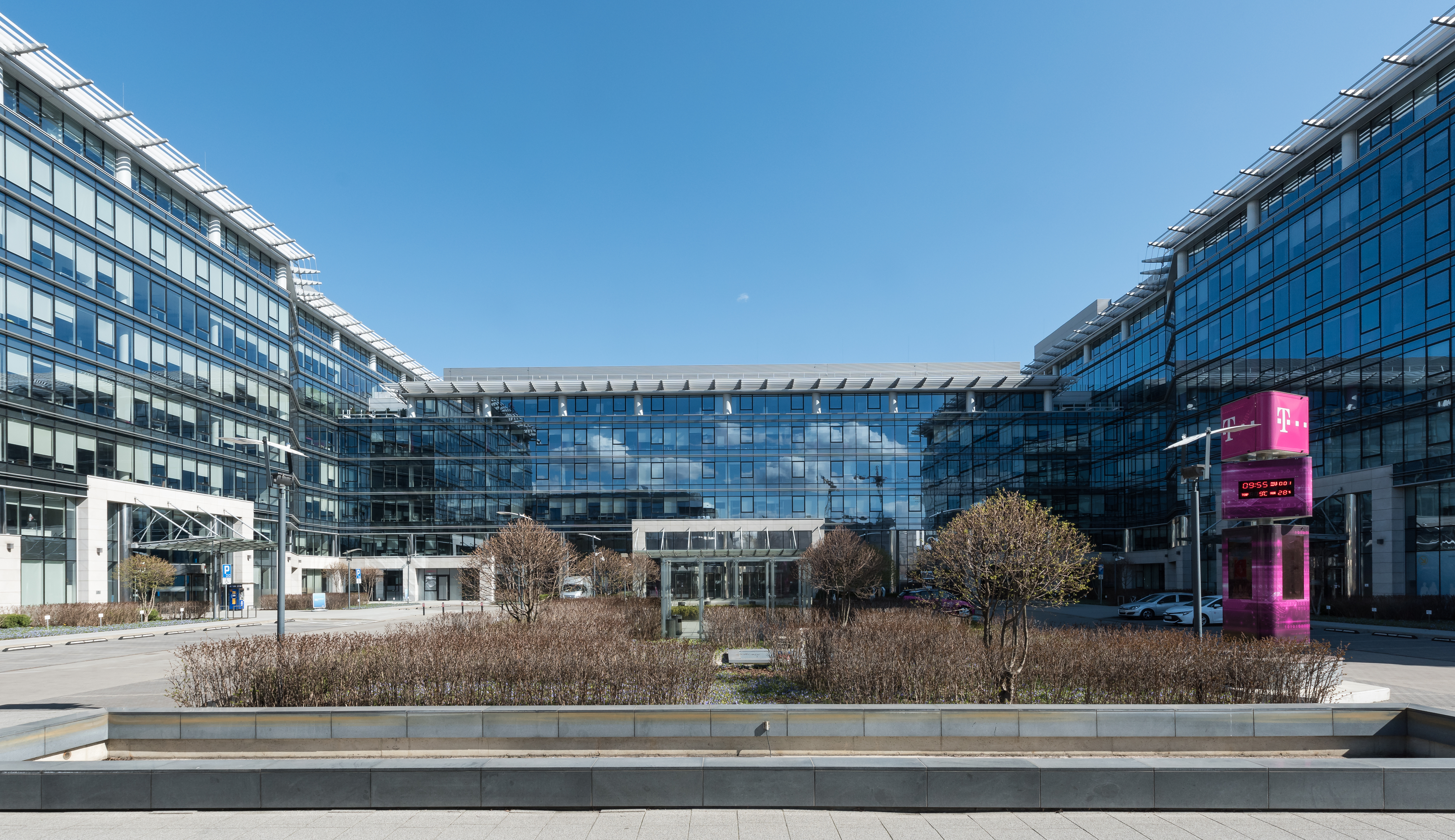
- Headquarters in Służewiec, Warsaw
- Type: Subsidiary
- Industry: Telecommunications
- Founded: December 1995; 30 years ago (in Warsaw, Poland)
- Headquarters: Warsaw, Poland
- Key people: Andreas Maierhofer, Chief Executive Officer
- Revenue: 1,482,000,000 euro (2018)
- Net income: −2,500,000 euro (2018)
- Number of employees: 4,800
- Parent: Deutsche Telekom
- ASN: 12912
- Website: www.t-mobile.pl

T-Mobile Polska S.A. is a Polish mobile phone network operator. The company was formerly named Polska Telefonia Cyfrowa (lit. "Polish Digital Telephony") and operated under the name Era, until being rebranded as T-Mobile on 5 June 2011. As in other European countries, the company operates a GSM (2G, 4G LTE and 5G NR) network. Following a decade-long ownership dispute with the French Vivendi corporation, the company has been wholly owned by the German telecommunications provider Deutsche Telekom since 2010.

== History ==
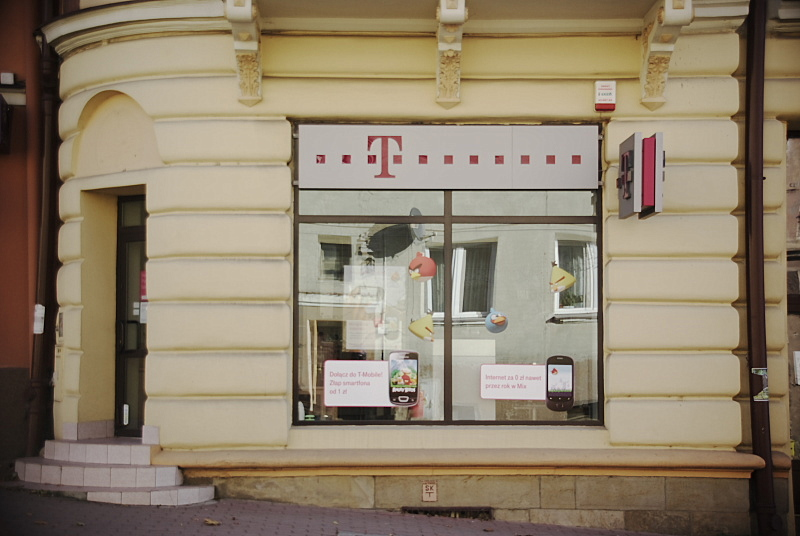
T-Mobile Polska store in Sanok, November 2011.

Polska Telefonia Cyfrowa was founded as a company in December 1995, and on 26 February 1996 it won a license to provide telecommunications services paging number 602 and permission to build a mobile radio communication network according to the GSM standard in the 900 MHz band, which was later extended to GSM 1800 MHz. The first test (non-commercial) base stations were launched during the International Trade Fair in June 1996 and a few base stations in Warsaw. The commercial launch of the network took place on 16 September 1996.

At the end of 2004, Era had over 8.6 million customers and was the largest mobile phone network operator in Central Europe, and by the end of June 2011 it had 13.2 million subscribers, placing it third in the market with 30% market share. Era was one of Poland's most recognizable domestic brand names, partly because the company pursued an aggressive advertising campaign that made Era billboards, sponsored events, and other commercials ubiquitous in Poland. Towards the end of 2005, Era became the first mobile phone operator in Poland (and eighth in Europe) to have 10 million customers. The 10,000,000th client signing was celebrated with a concert by Van Morrison in Warsaw. Era was the first operator in the country to launch a HSDPA service in October 2006.

T-Mobile Polska closed its 3G UMTS network in April 2023.

In November 2026 T-Mobile Polska started deploying IPv6 protocol to their FTTH service.

== Services ==
=== Tak Tak ===
The company's prepaid mobile phone service was formerly called Tak Tak (Yes Yes), and is now called T-Mobile na kartę.

=== Heyah ===
The first and former Heyah logo (2004–2009) was introduced in a "teaser" campaign before it was revealed what the product it represented was.

Heyah is a pay-as-you-go flanker brand offered by T-Mobile Polska. The brand was introduced in 2004 as T-Mobile Polska's youth-focused offering but made no reference to either T-Mobile or Era in its branding. Although it was marketed primarily toward young people, it had a substantial effect on the Polish mobile telephony market with its significantly lower prices and one-second billing. Within a month of launch it had attracted over one million users.

In 2020, a series of cryptic advertisements played on TV. They featured regular commercials for products, the commercials would glitch out to show 5 letters (4 of which were censored), which would show a link to a website called "wieszcorobić.pl". It would later be revealed that the 5 letters spelled out "Heyah". The company would rename to Heyah_01

Around 2022, Heyah shifted its target market to the Ukrainian minority in Poland.

=== tuBiedronka ===
tuBiedronka is a prepaid mobile phone brand offering by T-Mobile Polska in co-operation with the Polish discount supermarket chain Biedronka. The service was launched on 19 January 2009.

=== My Wallet ===
In October 2012, the company launched a commercial NFC wallet service in Poland called "MyWallet". The MyWallet services include NFC payment of two Mastercard credit cards and one MIFARE transit fare-collection card.

=== Red Bull Mobile ===
In 2023, the Polish branch of Red Bull Mobile switched from a youth-focused prepaid offer on Play to an app-based, youth-focused hybrid-postpaid offer on T-Mobile Polska.

== Marketing ==
Era signed a two-year sponsorship deal with Polish Basketball League in seasons 2003–2005 as Era Basket Liga.

T-Mobile signed a two-year sponsorship deal in June 2011 with the Ekstraklasa football league, the top-level league in Polish football. Its official name at the time was T-Mobile Ekstraklasa. The company has proposed to promote the use of new technologies within the game, as well as offering Polish football fans a series of promotional deals. In 2017, the league was renamed to Lotto Ekstraklasa for sponsorship purposes after Totalizator Sportowy, the operator of Poland's national lottery games, took over the sponsorship, with the deal reported to be worth US$7.2 million annually.

In January 2013, T-Mobile Polska started a marketing campaign involving the figure of Vladimir Lenin who was the leader of Soviet Russia during the Polish–Soviet War (1919–1920). The campaign was intended to promote the brand of Heyah. The TV and billboard advertisements resulted in a debate on business ethics. The campaign has been viewed as unethical. There has even been some suspicion of the company utilising another controversial figure – Adolf Hitler – in a future campaign. Finally, under the pressure of public opinion and a protest action Heyah Hitler, the campaign was aborted.

== See also ==
- List of mobile network operators of Europe § Poland
