= Xavier Niel =

French billionaire businessman (born 1967)

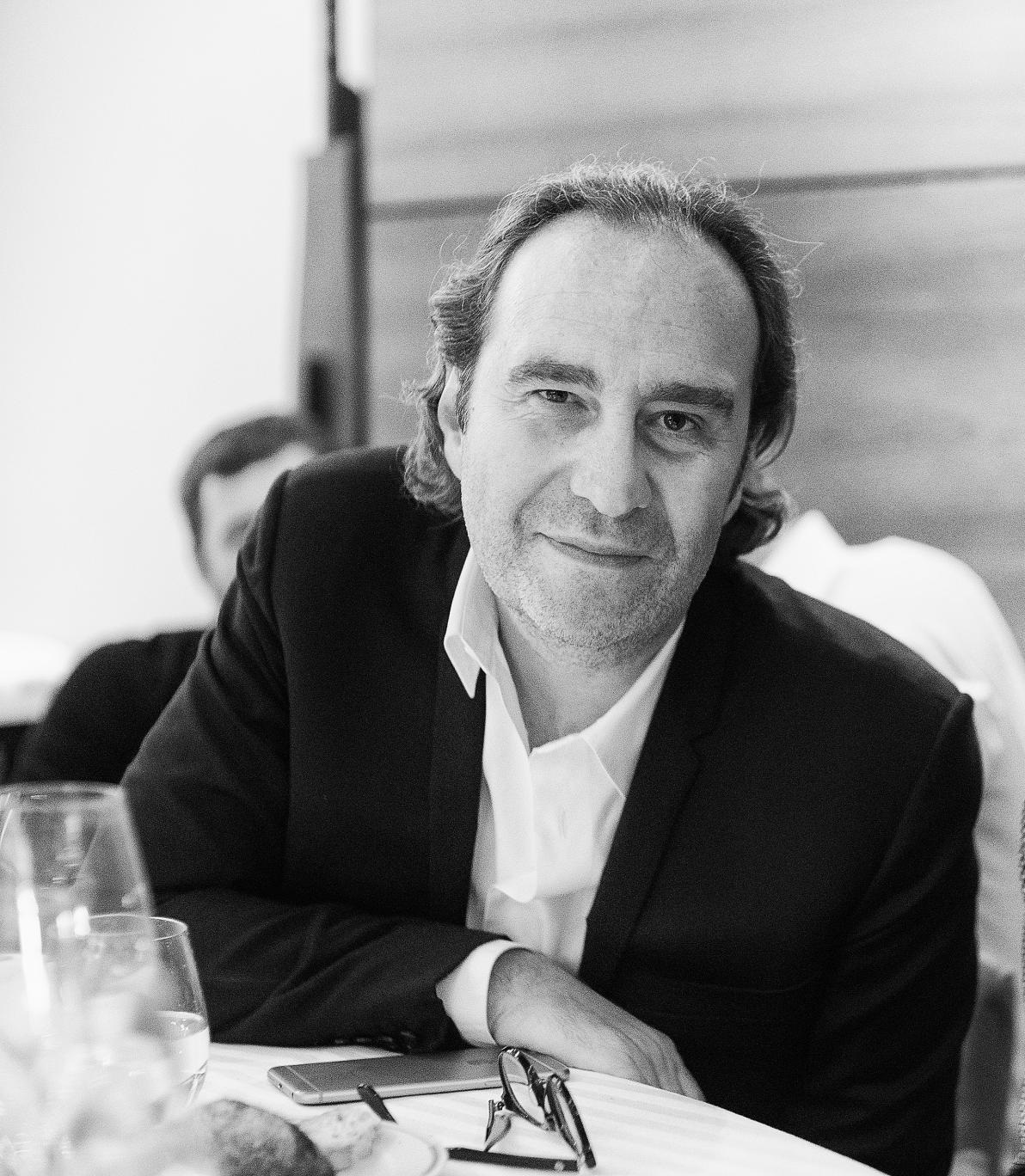
- Niel in 2014
- Born: 25 August 1967 (age 59); Maisons-Alfort, France
- Occupation: Businessman
- Known for: Founder, chairman and majority shareholder, Iliad
- Partner: Delphine Arnault (2010–present)
- Children: 4

Xavier Niel (French pronunciation: [gzavje njɛl]; born 25 August 1967) is a French billionaire entrepreneur and investor. He is the founder and majority shareholder of the telecommunications group Iliad and the largest shareholder of Vodafone Group and Westfield Group and a co-owner of the newspaper Le Monde. Niel also serves as chairman of Iliad, and sits on the board of KKR and ByteDance.

As of July 2026, his net worth is estimated at €30.1 billion by Challenges and at US$16 billion by Forbes.

== Early life ==
Xavier Niel was born into a middle-class family in the Val-de-Marne department, southeast of Paris. His family lived in Créteil, in the Mont-Mesly neighborhood. His father worked as a legal advisor for a pharmaceutical company, and his mother was an accountant.

Mont-Mesly is a large postwar public housing development built from the late 1950s on a hill in western Créteil. It consists of several hundred HLM (habitation à loyer modéré, or subsidized public housing) buildings and is now designated as a quartier prioritaire de la politique de la ville, the French government's classification for disadvantaged urban neighborhoods targeted for public investment. In his 2024 memoir, Niel described the area during his childhood as a neighborhood undergoing rapid change, with thousands of people arriving from across France and abroad over a short period. He recalled an environment marked by genuine social diversity and integration that generally worked, although not without tensions. He also described classmates bringing firearms to school, taken from their homes and shown to friends during breaks, as well as knife fights among teenagers. After he returned home covered in blood following a fight, his parents transferred him to a private Catholic school.

Niel attended Allezard Elementary School and Louis Pasteur Middle School in Créteil before transferring to Collège Maillé and later Lycée Saint-Michel-de-Picpus, a private Catholic school in Paris that attracted students from a wide range of religious and social backgrounds. He has described himself as an average student who was, in his own words, "bad at nothing and good at nothing." After graduating from high school, he briefly attended college before dropping out in 1987.

When he was 14, his father gave him a Sinclair ZX81 home computer, a British machine that sold for about 700 French francs at the time. Niel has described the gift as the turning point in his career. Every week, his father would stop at a neighborhood coffeehouse and bring home a copy of Hebdogiciel, a weekly computer newspaper that published programs readers could type into their own computers. Niel taught himself programming by copying those listings into his ZX81. At a time when relatively few people in France knew how to write software, he soon began earning money by developing server software for companies, including newspaper publishers. While still in high school, he spent his evenings, weekends, and, by his own account, many nights writing software before returning to class the next morning, earning his first income as a programmer.

== Career ==
=== Early businesses ===
In 1987, after dropping out of college at the age of 19, Niel founded his first company, which operated services on Minitel, the French videotex network that predated the World Wide Web. The company specialized in adult chat services. To operate legally, Niel acquired publishing licenses, a regulatory framework originally intended for newspapers and magazines, and used them to become a registered Minitel service provider. He has said that the business made him a millionaire, in today's euros and dollars, by the age of 24.

During the same period, Niel and businessman Fernand Develter invested in a number of Paris-based peep-show establishments. Some of these businesses later became the subject of criminal investigations, and certain managers were convicted on charges related to procuring. According to press reports, the investigations concerned activities involving direct physical contact between clients and sex workers. These proceedings did not target Niel personally, although his investments in the sector attracted media attention.

=== Canal+ hacking and intelligence work ===
As a teenager, Niel hacked Canal+ television decoders. After being identified by police, he was summoned to the French Ministry of the Interior rather than prosecuted. According to the investigative biography Xavier Niel: La voie du pirate, officers from the Direction de la surveillance du territoire, France's domestic intelligence agency at the time, offered him a choice between criminal prosecution and cooperation. He chose the latter and spent several months working with the agency, helping monitor Soviet activity on French telecommunications networks.

During the same period, Niel gained access to the Radiocom 2000 mobile telephone network, then used by French government officials, and obtained the phone numbers assigned to 84 official vehicles, including one used by President François Mitterrand. Le Monde reported the incident at the time, identifying the hacker only as a 20-year-old computer specialist. Niel later confirmed publicly that he was responsible.

=== Telecommunications ===
After his early activities in the Minitel sector, Xavier Niel became involved in the emerging internet industry. In 1995, he invested in Worldnet, one of France’s first consumer internet service providers. The company was sold in 2000 for approximately €40 million, shortly before the collapse of the dot-com bubble.

In 1999, Niel founded the telecommunications group Iliad and launched Free, an internet service provider. In 2002, Free introduced a broadband offer priced at €29.99 per month and launched the Freebox, combining internet access, television and telephone services in a single package.

In 2012, Iliad entered the French mobile market with the launch of Free Mobile. Its flagship plan, which included unlimited calls, unlimited text messages and mobile data for €19.99 per month, was priced significantly below comparable offers from the three incumbent operators. The launch intensified competition in the French mobile market and was followed by substantial price reductions across the sector.

From the late 2010s onwards, Niel expanded his telecommunications interests outside France. In 2018, Iliad Italia launched operations in Italy with a mobile plan priced at €5.99 per month. In 2020, the group acquired the Polish operator Play, one of the country’s largest mobile operators.

Through his investment vehicle NJJ, Niel also acquired or invested in telecommunications operators in Monaco (Monaco Telecom), Switzerland (Salt), Ireland (eir), Cyprus (Epic Cyprus), Malta (Epic Malta) and Ukraine (Lifecell). In 2023, NJJ became the largest shareholder of Millicom (42% stake), a telecommunications group operating on 12 markets in Latin America. Niel subsequently made two unsuccessful attempts to acquire the company outright.

In 2026, Xavier Niel became Vodafone’s largest shareholder after acquiring Etisalat’s 16.2% stake for approximately $6 billion through his family investment vehicle Vega.

=== Unibail-Rodamco-Westfield ===
Since 2020, Niel has been acquiring shares in the real estate company Unibail-Rodamco-Westfield, as of 2024 he was owning 25% of the shares of the company. Unibail-Rodamco-Westfield has an international presence in Europe (France, Spain, UK, Germany) and in the United States in California (Westfield Topanga, Westfield Century City).

=== Press ===
In late 2010, along with Pierre Bergé and Matthieu Pigasse, Niel acquired a controlling stake in Groupe Le Monde which edits the daily newspaper Le Monde but also magazines such as l’Obs, Courrier International and Télérama. In February 2020, Niel acquired through his personal holding 100% of Groupe Nice-Matin, which edits the newspapers Nice-Matin, Var-Matin and Monaco-Matin. In March 2020, he acquired France-Antilles, a daily newspaper in the French West Indies. In June 2020, Niel acquired Paris-Turf which is France's first horseracing newspaper.

=== Other investments ===
In March 2010, Niel cofounded with Jeremie Berrebi Kima Ventures, a fund dedicated to invest in 50 to 100 startups a year everywhere in the world. Kima Ventures already invested in 330 companies from February 2010 to August 2014 in 32 countries. Business Insider described Niel and Jeremie Berrebi as almost certainly the most active angel investors in the world. Since 2015, Jean de La Rochebrochard is the Managing Partner of the fund.

In 2013, Niel created a school named 42, which is a free technical school with no teachers, no books, no tuition for 1000 people every year. As of 2021, 33 campuses have been opened in the world.

In June 2017, Niel welcomed the French President Emmanuel Macron for the inauguration of Station F, a business incubator for startups located in Paris, known as the largest in the world.

In April 2023, Niel was part of an investor group that announced that it had bought the Swiss asset manager GAM.

In October 2023, Niel together with Rodolphe Saadé, Eric Schmidt, and other investors announced a €200 million investment in artificial intelligence which includes "the purchase of a supercomputer and the creation of a dedicated research laboratory," later named Kyutai. Prior to that, he was a seed investor in Mistral AI.

=== Other activities ===
In 2015, Niel cofounded Mediawan, an international production and distribution group, together with Matthieu Pigasse and Pierre-Antoine Capton.

In 2016, Niel founded Art 42, a street-art gallery self-described as an "anti-museum" inside the Paris campus of 42.

Niel joined the board of US investment firm Kohlberg Kravis Roberts in March 2018 and the board of TikTok's parent company, ByteDance, in September 2024.

His book "Une Sacrée Envie de Foutre le Bordel" ("An Urge to Make a Mess"), co-written by former Paris deputy mayor Jean-Louis Missika was published in 2024 by Groupe Flammarion.

== Legal problems ==
In May 2004, Niel was indicted and detained for a month at the La Santé Prison for alleged procuring and misuse of company assets, which occurred in several sex shops in which he was a shareholder. In August 2005, a nolle prosequi was pronounced for the procuring part of his indictment, while in October 2006, he was given a two years suspended prison sentence for the misuse of company assets.

== Property status ==
In 2016, according to Forbes magazine, he ranked as the 129th wealthiest individual globally, with a net worth of US$9.7 billion (approximately nine billion euros). He was also listed as the ninth-wealthiest person in France in 2014 by Challenges and seventh by Forbes in 2016.

In 2019, Forbes ranked him 18th among France's wealthiest individuals, with €3.6 billion, marking a drop of ten positions from the previous ranking. The magazine noted that "the most significant decline was seen in Xavier Niel, the founder of Iliad-Free, who fell ten places after a disastrous year on the stock market".

According to Challenges in July 2025, Xavier Niel and his family reportedly held a fortune of €27 billion making him the seventh wealthiest individual in France.

As of July 2026, his net worth is estimated at €30.1 billion by Challenges and at US$15.5 billion by Forbes (197th globally).

== Recognition ==
In August 2015, Wired named him as the seventh most influential personality in technology in the world. In February 2017, Vanity Fair named him the most influential French person in the world abroad.

Niel received the title of Knight of the Legion of Honour in 2022.

== Personal life ==
Niel's domestic partner is French businesswoman Delphine Arnault, who is a director and executive vice president at Louis Vuitton, and the chairwoman and chief executive officer of Dior. She is the daughter of Bernard Arnault. Niel has a son (Joseph, born in 2016) and a daughter (Élisa, born in 2012) with her and two sons (Jules and John, born in 2000 and 2002) from a previous relationship, and lives in the 16th arrondissement of Paris.

Since 2013, he has also owned a five star hotel in French ski resort Courchevel. In 2016, he acquired the Hôtel Lambert an hôtel particulier from 1640 on the Île Saint-Louis, in the 4th arrondissement of Paris for more than $226 million, to be reportedly used as the headquarters for Niel's cultural foundation.
