= Telecommunications in French Guiana =

There are telecommunications in French Guiana.

== Telephones ==
In 1923, there were 117 telephones in use, with 241 miles of wire. The number of telephones was approximately 6,800 by 1975, approximately 13,700 by 1982 and 18,100 by 1989. There were 47,000 telephone main lines in use in 1995, and 51,000 in 2001. There were 138,200 mobile cellular phones in 2002.

Telephone system:
domestic: fair open wire and microwave radio relay system
international: satellite earth station – 1 Intelsat (Atlantic Ocean)

== Telegraphs ==
In 1923, there were nine telegraph offices, with 205 miles of wire.

== Radio ==
Radio Cayenne began to broadcast on 9 June 1951, with regular broadcasts from January 1953. In 1998, radio stations were broadcast on AM 2, FM 14 (including 6 repeaters) and shortwave 6 (including 5 repeaters). There were 7,100 radio receivers by 1975. There were 104,000 radios in 1997.

== Television ==
There were three television stations (plus eight low-power repeaters) in 1997. There were 3,000 television receivers by 1975. There were 30,000 televisions in 1997.

== Internet ==
There number of internet users was 2,000 in 2000, and 3,200 in 2002. There were two internet service providers in 2000.

The top-level domain country code is .gf.

== See also ==
- French Guiana
- Telecommunications in France
