= Play (telecommunications) =

Polish telecommunications provider

- Industry: Telecommunications
- Founded: February 2007; 19 years ago
- Founder: Chris Bannister
- Headquarters: Poland
- Key people: Ken Campbell
- Products: Mobile Telephony; Landline telephony Cable Television; Broadband Internet
- Parent: Iliad SA
- Website: www.play.pl

P4 sp. z o.o., known as Play (until January 2022, also as Play Communications SA, former parent company of P4 registered in Luxembourg), is a Polish telecommunications company. Play was founded as a mobile telephony operator in 2007 and has gradually increased its local market share in mobile, up to 27% as of 2017. In September 2020, Play became part of French Iliad. Before being sold, Iceland's Novator Partners, led by Icelandic businessman Thor Bjorgolfsson, acquired a large stake in the company. As of November 20, 2020, Iliad owns 96.66% of Play.

On August 31, 2023, UPC Poland merged with Play after Iliad acquired the company from Liberty Global to become a full-service telecommunications provider.

== Network ==
As of 2026, Play is the second biggest cellular network in Poland with over 13.6 million customers behind only Orange Polska. PLAY uses EGSM 900 and GSM1800 for its 2G services, UMTS 2100 and UMTS 900 for 3G and LTE700, LTE800, LTE900 LTE1800, LTE2100 and LTE 2600 for LTE. Its MCC is 260–06.

=== Native Network ===
As of November 3, 2013, Play Mobile has 3288 EGSM 900 BTS, 4143 UMTS 2100 nodeB and 2175 UMTS 900 nodeB's. UMTS 900 and UMTS 2100 network Play calls the 4G network. Currently, 82% of population is covered with Play's native 4G network and 40% of the population with 2G network. 4G is available in more than 300 cities and towns around Poland. Play started building its 3G network at the beginning of its existence (2007) and announced that its goal is to cover all of Poland with UMTS while provide GSM services through roaming. Play began building its GSM network in March 2009 in apparent bid to reduce roaming costs. EGSM 900 BTS and UMTS 900 nodeB use the same licence frequency. In place when are EGSM 900 usually is not UMTS 900. Play Mobile Broadband (Play Online) products did not use 2G network.

On February 13, 2013 the company won the tender for the frequency of 1800 MHz. On February 19, 2013, Play filed in the Office of Electronic Communications applications for booking three blocks from the frequency band 1800 MHz. The new frequency will be used probably for to build LTE network or shared network (LTE and DCS).

=== Roaming ===
On September 6, 2006 Play signed a domestic roaming agreement with Plus operator - Polkomtel. It allowed Play subscribers to access Plus' GSM network as well as UMTS network. Roaming was nationwide, free and unlimited. In addition, Play subscribers could manually pick Plus GSM network despite presence of Play's native network. In October 2018, Play started phasing this possibility out. In December, Play has announced they are withdrawing the contract with Polkomtel by 2019.

In July 2010, Play signed a domestic roaming agreement with Orange operator - Centertel. The initial agreement included a limited territorial coverage. In November 2011, Play and Orange signed an annex to the agreement, expanding the coverage of the whole Polish territory. However, Plus and Orange domestic network could not be used with Play's Mobile Broadband products. In 2021, Orange has announced a new contract with Play, extending domestic roaming until 2025.

During the Mobile World Congress 2013 in Barcelona Play announced that the third domestic roaming partner will be T-Mobile operator - PTC. Agreement with T-Mobile has expired at the end of 2021.

In 2017, Play started requiring users to enable domestic roaming, with roaming with only one operator enabled at a time.

In 2025, Play terminated its domestic roaming agreement with Orange, as its network range had become sufficient to eliminate the need for such service.

Virgin Mobile Poland is using the Play network (including Orange network, excluding Plus network).

== IPO ==
In July 2017 the company was offered to the public and listed on the Warsaw Stock Exchange, with plans to raise €1.03bn from its first IPO.

== See also ==
- Economy of Poland
- List of Polish companies
