= Autorité de Régulation des Communications Électroniques, des Postes et de la Distribution de la Presse =

The Autorité de Régulation des Communications Électroniques, des Postes et de la Distribution de la Presse (ARCEP or Arcep) is the French regulatory authority in charge of regulating telecommunications, postal services and print media distribution in France. It can be compared somewhat with the United States' Federal Communications Commission (FCC), though regulation of the radio spectrum falls to the Agence nationale des fréquences (fr: ANFR), and regulation of audiovisual and digital communication falls to the Autorité de régulation de la communication audiovisuelle et numérique (fr: Arcom) since the merger on 1 January 2022 of the former Conseil supérieur de l'audiovisuel (fr: CSA) and the former Haute Autorité pour la diffusion des œuvres et la protection des droits sur internet (fr: Hadopi). The ARCEP has its head office in 14 rue Gerty Archimède in Bercy, Paris, France.

== History ==
ARCEP or Arcep is France's "Electronic Communications, Postal and Print media distribution Regulatory Authority".

It was created on 5 January 1997, and originally called the "Telecoms Regulatory Authority" (officially in French: Autorité de Régulation des Télécommunication or ART).

It was later extended to also regulate postal services on 21 May 2005 when it was renamed the "Electronic Communications and Postal Services Authority" (officially in French: Autorité de Régulation des Communications Électroniques et des Postes or ARCEP). The French authority was modelled for national authorities regulating these sectors in several French-speaking African countries (Benin, Burkina Faso, Chad, Gabon, Niger, and Togo), adopting the same name and acronym with a similar statutory extension of their missions, and following common terminologies in cooperation with France's authority.

Finally, the regulation of print media distribution (in the press sector) was added on 18 October 2019, when it took its current name (keeping its acronym), overtaking the missions of two other former authorities, the "Print Media Distribution Authority" (officially in French: Autorité de régulation de la distribution de la presse or ARDP) and of the former "Higher Council of Press Messenging Services" (officially in French: Conseil supérieur des messageries de presse or CSMP).

== Organisation ==
Arcep is managed by a college of seven members (5 members until 2005). Three of them, including the president, are appointed by the President of the Republic, on the proposal of the Prime Minister; two members are appointed by the President of the National Assembly and the last two by the President of the Senate.

Members of the college are not dismissable, their six-year term is not renewable and their function is incompatible with any other professional activity, national mandate or public employment. They are also subject to asset declaration and interest declaration obligations.

In Europ, Arcep is member of BEREC (Body of European Regulators of Electronics Communications).

== Role and responsibilities ==
The principal missions of ARCEP are:

- Define the regulation that applies to all or some of the operators
- Allocate frequency resources (granted from the separate ANFR authority for use in telecommunications and media distribution over public networks in Metropolitan France and in overseas departments and regions) and numbering resources, through individual decisions
- Oversee the financing and supply of the universal service

== Legal form ==
Arcep has the status of Independent Administrative Authority (IAA). This is the principal legal form that the legislator has most often chosen to build regulatory authorities.

== See also ==
- Regulatory Authority for Audiovisual and Digital Communication
