= Cellnex =

Spanish telecommunications company

Cellnex Telecom, S.A.
- Type: Sociedad Anónima
- Traded as: BMAD: CLNX
- ISIN: ES0105066007
- Industry: Telecommunications
- Founded: 2015; 11 years ago (as Cellnex Telecom in Barcelona, Spain; predecessor Abertis Telecom since 2000)
- Headquarters: Madrid (legal); Barcelona (operational), Spain
- Key people: Marco Patuano (CEO)
- Revenue: ▲€3,995 million (2025)
- Operating income: ▲€476 million (2025)
- Number of employees: ▼2,511 (2025)
- Website: cellnex.com

Cellnex Telecom is a Spanish telecommunications infrastructure and services company. The company operates a portfolio of over 110,000 telecommunications sites in ten European countries (Spain, France, Italy, United Kingdom, Poland, Portugal, Sweden, Denmark, Netherlands and Switzerland), providing share-use infrastructure primarily to mobile networks operators. Its activity is divided into four main areas: telecommunications infrastructures; distributed antenna Systems (DAS), small cells and other network services; broadcast networks; fibre, connectivity and hosting services.

Cellnex was formed in 2015 as a spin-off of the telecommunications infrastructure division of Abertis and listed on the Madrid Stock Exchange that same year. It became a component of the IBEX 35 index in June 2016. Between 2015 and 2022, the company expanded from its original base in Spain to twelve European markets through a series of acquisitions. In November 2022, Cellnex announced a strategic shift away from acquisition-led growth towards organic expansion and deleveraging.

Marco Patuano is the CEO since the Annual Shareholder's Meeting hold in June 2023, ratified the appointment. He succeeds Tobias Martinez, who led the company through its significant growth and expansion since its IPO in 2015.

Cellnex Telecom had revenues of 3,995€Mn in 2025 and an EBITDA of 3,317€Mn. At the end of 2025, there were 2,511 employees.. Cellnex Telecom is listed on the market of the Bolsa de Madrid and is part of the IBEX35. It is also part of the sustainability indices FTSE4GOOD, CDP (Carbon Disclosure Project) and Standard Ethics.

== History ==
In 2000, Acesa Telecom (later Abertis Telecom) acquired 52% of Tradia, a Spanish broadcasting infrastructure company, and merged into Abertis Telecom (now Cellnex Telecom). Three years later, after Auna was spun-off, Retevisión's audiovisual business became part of Abertis Telecom. In 2005, the deployment of Digital Terrestrial Television began in Spain, with a network that reached 80% population coverage carrying out the first tests in Madrid, Barcelona, Valencia, Zaragoza and Gijón. In 2006, the company was awarded the contract by which it became the operator of DTT signals for Spanish broadcasters with national coverage. In 2010, the “Analogue Blackout” occurred in Spain, after the complete digitization of Abertis Telecom network of centers. Between 2012 and 2013, the company acquired more than 2,500 telecommunication towers from Telefónica and Yoigo, and laid the foundations for its future position as a neutral operator. In 2014, the company made its first international acquisition by entering the Italian market, it acquired TowerCo, an Italian telecommunications operator, which manages the mobile phone towers located in the entire motorway network of Italy, thus initiating the process of internationalization. That same year it deployed the first Internet of Things (IoT) network in Spain with Sigfox technology.

=== IPO and European expansion ===
Cellnex Telecom is the name which the company Abertis Telecom was renamed to prepare for its IPO. The company, a subsidiary of the Abertis company, officially changed its name on 1 April 2015, after being approved at the shareholders' meeting that took place on 23 March 2015. On 24 April it was made public that the company would debut on the stock market on 7 May that year, at a price that would range between 12 and 14 euros per share, estimating a market capitalization between 2.8 and 3.2 billion euros. The company shares opened at €15.50 ont heir first day of trading.

In June 2016, Cellnex was included in the IBEX35, the benchmark stock market index of the Bolsa de Madrid, replacing Sacyr.

The company expanded rapidly into new European Markets through acquisitions: France in 2016 through a tower deal With Bouygues Telecom, the Netherlands in 2016 (Shere Group and Towerlink), and Switzerland in 2017 through the acquisition of towers from Salt. In 2019, Cellnex entered the United Kingdom through the acquisition of the telecoms divisions of Arqiva and Ireland through the acquisition of Cignal Infrastructure from InfraVia Capital Partners.

In October 2017, Cellnex moved its registered office from Barcelona to Madrid although the majority of its workforce and operations remained in Barcelona.

In November 2020, Cellnex and CK Hutchison announced a series of agreements under which Cellnex would acquire approximately 24,600 existing telecommunications sites and commitments for approximately 5,400 additional sites across six European markets: United Kingdom, Italy, Austria, Denmark, Sweden and Ireland. The transaction, one of the largest in the European tower sector, was completed in 2022.

In 2020, Cellnex entered in the Polish market through the acquisition of tower insfrastructures from P4 (Play), followed by the acquisition of Polkomtel Infrastruktura in 2021.

=== Strategic shift ===
In November 2022, Cellnex announced the end of its acquisitions-led growth phase and a new strategic focus on organic growth, operational efficiency and balance sheet.

Cellnex divested non-core assets: it sold its Irish business to Phoenix Tower International for approximately €971 million, and its Austrian business to a consortium comprising Vauban Infrastructure Partners, EDF Invest and MEAG for €803 million.

In March 2024, S&P Global Ratings upgraded Cellnex's credit rating to BBB− granting the company investment grade status for the first time.

In 2025, Cellnex launched a €800 million share buy back programme.. Cellnex makes its first dividend payment in 2026.

== Divisions ==
Cellnex Telecom is present in four different areas:

1. Telecommunications Infrastructure Services: The company has more than 110,000 locations and offers a set of services that provides infrastructure and related services used for the transmission an broadcasting of content. The core business, representing approximately 81% of revenues in 2025. Cellnex owns and manages tower sites that it leases to mobile network operators on a share-use basis, enabling multiple tenants to use the same infrastructure.
2. Audiovisual broadcasting networks: Cellnex offers DTT and radio coverage to 99% of the population in Spain
3. DAS & Small Cells: Cellnex Telecom facilitates broadband connectivity through DAS (Distributed Antenna System) and “small cells” systems for those mobile operators that require guaranteed coverage in spaces such as sports stadiums, shopping centers, airports, metro lines or railway stations.
4. Fiber, connetivity and housing services: including the Nexloop (subsidiary of Cellnex Telecom) fiber business in France.

== Presence in Europe ==
The company has thousands of mobile phone towers, being the first independent European operator in the management of telecommunications infrastructures. Following a phase of rapid expansion through acquitions, Cellnex shifted its strategy in 2022 including the divestment of its business in Ireland and Austria. As of 2026, Cellnex operates in ten European Countries: Spain, France, Italy, the United Kingdom, Poland, Portugal, Sweden, Denmark, the Netherlands and Switzerland

=== Cellnex Spain ===
Cellnex Telecom has a network of telecommunications infrastructures in Spain of 10,768 operating sites by the end of 2025, distributed throughout the territory, which provide wide geographical coverage and allow it to offer services to mobile operators, broadcasters and administrations. Cellnex, as a neutral operator, offers all mobile operators the services necessary for the wireless transmission of data and content.

=== Cellnex Italy ===
Cellnex operates a large portfolio of wireless telecommunications sites in Italy through its subsidiaries Galata, Iliad, CommsCon and Towerco. In total, Cellnex has a network of 22,763 sites in Italy country by the end of 2025.

=== Cellnex France ===
Cellnex France was created in July 2016 after reaching an acquisition agreement with Bouygues Telecom. The agreement with the company, which includes the usage of sites until 2022, was renewed in February 2017 and December 2018. In addition, in May 2019, the company announced a new agreement with Iliad France with which it will manage the sites that are currently integrated into Free, a French voice and data operator. In total, Cellnex has a network of 26,945 sites in France (end of 2025).

=== Cellnex Netherlands ===
Cellnex Telecom acquired Towerlink Netherlands B.V., Shere Masten B.V. in 2016 and Alticom B.V. in 2017. The three companies have more than 918 telecommunications sites for the distribution of mobile data communication and telecommunications. The main customers interested in telecom infrastructure services are the Dutch mobile network operators KPN, Vodafone, T-Mobile and Tele2. The sites are distributed throughout the country and are managed from their central Reeuwijk office. Cellnex has a network of 4,275 sites in The Netherlands by the end of 2025.

=== Cellnex UK ===
Cellnex acquired the telecommunications division of Arqiva in the United Kingdom, adding 8,300 locations to Cellnex in the British market. The agreement follows the announcement in June 2020 of a long-term strategic alliance with BT, through which Cellnex obtained the rights to commercialize and operate 220 high-rise towers distributed throughout the United Kingdom. This alliance entails the acquisition of around 7,400 owned sites and the marketing rights for an additional 900 sites spread throughout the UK. Cellnex UK. The agreement also includes concessions for the use of street furniture for the deployment of telecommunications infrastructure in 14 boroughs of London. In Total Cellnex has a network of 13,713 sites in the United Kingdom by the end of 2025.

=== Cellnex Switzerland ===
Following the agreement with Salt in May 2019, Cellnex manages a portfolio of more than 6,000 sites and is permanently consolidated in Switzerland. Cellnex has a network of 5,676 sites in Switzerland by the end of 2025.

=== Cellnex Ireland ===
In September 2019, Cellnex reached an agreement with InfraVia Capital Partners for the acquisition of the Irish telecommunications tower and site operator Cignal.

In March 2024, it was announced Cellnex Ireland had been acquired by the Boca Raton, Florida-headquartered wireless infrastructure operator, Phoenix Tower International for €971 million.

Cellnex no longer operates in Ireland.

=== Cellnex Poland ===
In October 2020 Cellnex bought passive infrastructure from P4 (PLAY) later in February 2021 Cellnex bought passive and active infrastructure from Polkomtel Infrastruktura (PLUS GSM).

By the end of 2025, Cellnex has a network of 17,592 sites in Poland.

=== Cellnex Portugal ===
Cellnex operates in the Portuguese market managing 6,762 sites by the end of 2025.

=== Cellnex Sweden ===
Cellnex entered the Swedish market through the acquisition of telecom tower assets from CK Hutchison as part of a multi-country transaction completed between 2020 and 2022. By the end of 2025, the company operates 3,575 sites in Sweden.

=== Cellnex Denmark ===
Just as occurred with Cellnex's presence in Sweden, Cellnex entered Danish market through the tower acquisitions agreement with CK Hutchison. By the end of 2025, Cellnex operates 1,732 sites in the country.
