= Boris Zimin =

Russian businessman and philanthropist

- Борис Зимин
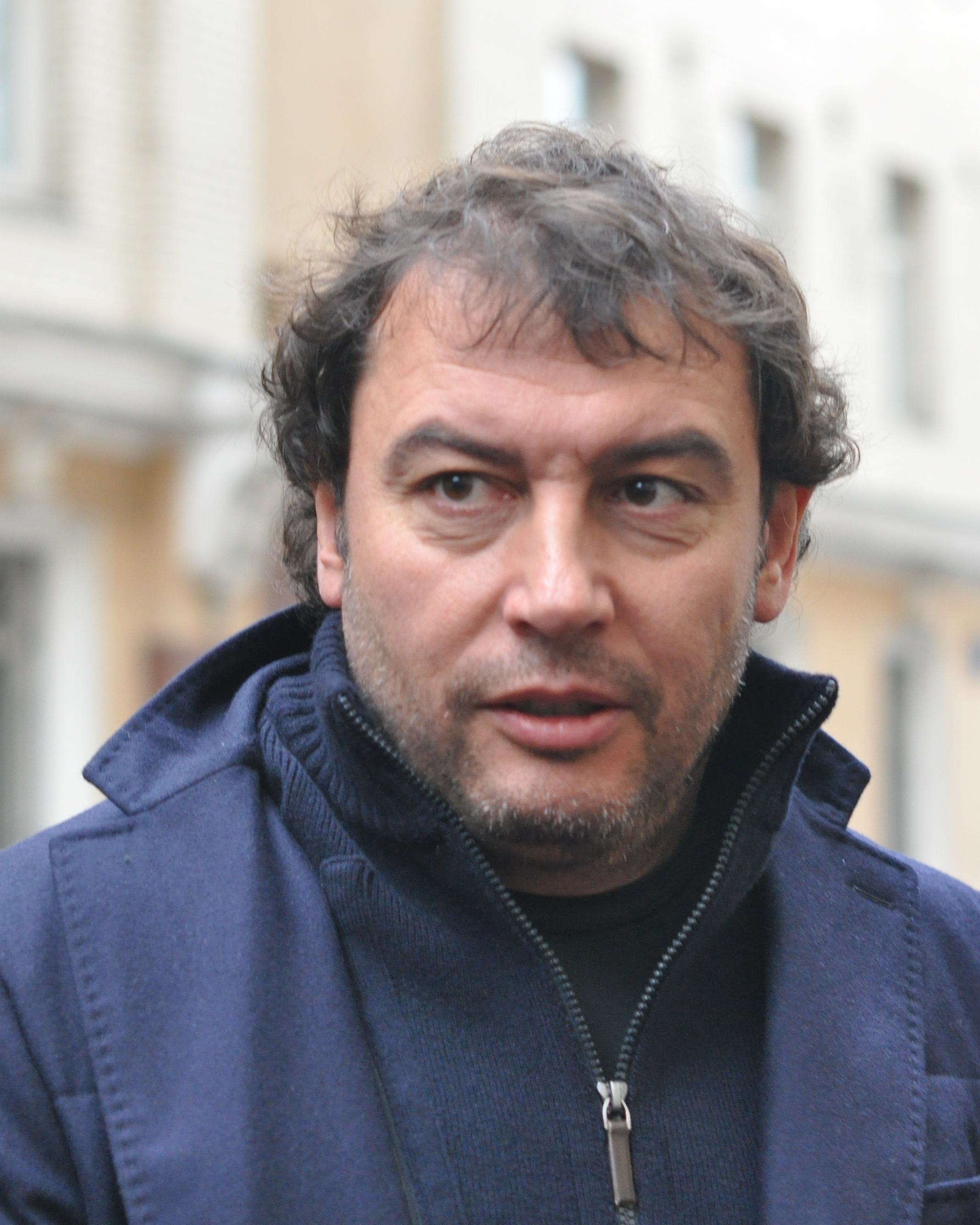
- Zimin at The Russia Forum in 2012
- Born: Boris Zimin; 24 November 1968 (age 57); Moscow, Russian SFSR, Soviet Union
- Citizenship: Russian
- Education: Higher School of Economics
- Occupations: businessman; philanthropist; public figure

Boris Dmitrievich Zimin (Russian: Бори́с Дми́триевич Зими́н; born November 24, 1968) is a Russian businessman and public figure, philanthropist, motor sportsman. The son of Dmitry Zimin, (1933-2021), the founder of VimpelCom company (brand name Beeline). Boris Zimin is involved with the Zimin Foundation, which finances and supports non-profit educational projects in the field of education, protection of human rights and freedom of speech, as well as scientific research in the field of natural sciences (mathematics, biology and medicine).

== Biography ==
Born on November 24, 1968, in Moscow to parents Dmitry Borisovich Zimin, head of the laboratory at the Radio Technical Institute of the Russian Academy of Sciences, and Maya Pavlovna Zimina (née Shakhmatova, born 1936), an archaeologist. Graduated from the Higher School of Economics. Served in the Soviet Armed Forces from 1987 to 1989, carrying out most of his service in Kazakhstan.

In 2002, Boris Zimin became president of the investment company BMT Management, which manages his father's funds.

Boris Zimin has seven children. His first wife is Lyudmila Zakharova (1992-1997), and his second is Ella Zimina (1997-2009, three children were born in this marriage). He married his third wife, Yulia Prokhorova, in 2012.

Since 2004, Boris Zimin lived in London and later moved to the United States. Since 2020, Boris lives in Israel.

=== Social activities ===
In 2001, Dmitry Zimin created a Dynasty Foundation aimed at supporting and developing Russian education, science and its popularization. The fund’s annual amount was set at $10 million. The son left his business in order to support the sciences alongside his father: first as a member of the Board, and starting in 2004, as Chairman of the Foundation's Board of Trustees. On May 25, 2015, the foundation was declared a "foreign agent" by the Ministry of Justice. In June, Moscow’s Tverskoy District Court fined Dynasty 300,000 rubles for refusing to self-register as a foreign agent. On July 5, Zimin Sr. decided to liquidate Dynasty and close its programs until the end of 2015.

In 2014, during the consideration of the complaint of Boris Zimin, who, due to the restriction imposed by bailiffs, had to postpone a business trip abroad, the Constitutional Court of the Russian Federation declared the detention of debtors at the border of the Russian Federation illegal.

In early 2014 Boris Zimin became the founder of the Sreda Foundation. Dmitry Zimin's capital was called the source of financing. In the first year, the fund allocated multimillion-dollar funding to independent liberal media: TV channels “TV Rain” and “TV2”, online media Colta.ru and “Mediazona”, the newspapers “Pskov province” and “Free course”, etc. It was assumed that these media outlets would receive support in the same amount in 2015 and 2016. However On July 28, 2015, by decision of the Ministry of Justice the fund was declared a "foreign agent". On July 30, Boris Zimin announced that the Sreda Foundation is closed.

From the end of 2015 charitable activities of the Zimins are carried out through the Zimin Foundation.

In 2016 Redkollegia (in Russian "Editorial Board") was established - a new independent award to support independent journalists in Russia. The Redkollegiya award is presented every month; these are not statuettes or diplomas, but monetary prizes — they are given to a journalist or a group of journalists for an amount chosen by a professional jury. In an interview in 2018, Boris Zimin reported that in 2015 only Russian legal entities were liquidated, while work continued.

In 2016, it became known that Boris Zimin and Mikhail Khodorkovsky were in talks with Galina Timchenko in 2014 about investing in a new media outlet, Meduza. Unable to reach an agreement, Khodorkovsky and Zimin each paid $250,000 as “compensation,” which was used to repay debts to launch the publication. In 2018, Kommersant wrote that in 2017, Boris Zimin donated $100,000 to the new outlet The Bell by Yelizaveta Osetinskaya.

On opening day of Zimin Institute for AI Solutions in Healthcare at the Technion (June 2022) Boris Zimin became Technion Guardian, a designation reserved for those who have reached the highest level of support of the institution.

In November 2022 Boris Zimin appointed Board Member of Nemtsov Foundation.

=== Political activity ===
Since 2011, Boris Zimin was the main public sponsor of the politician Alexei Navalny and Anti-Corruption Foundation (FBK). He was among the first 16 founding sponsors who raised 4.4 million rubles to create the FBK in 2011, and the first, along with Vladimir Ashurkov, to publicly announce his support for the fund. In 2012, Zimin reported that he sent 300,000 rubles a month to support the FBK. In 2020, he confirmed that he continued to finance the foundation on a monthly basis. Zimin Jr. also supports the politician Ilya Yashin, but only from time to time. He also provides support to political prisoners — both morally and financially. At the end of July 2020, Alexei Navalny published his tax return, according to which his 2019 income amounted to 5.4 million rubles. Navalny called entrepreneur Boris Zimin the main source of income for his individual enterprise.

In August 2020, Boris Zimin paid for the emergency evacuation from Omsk to Berlin of Navalny who had fallen into a coma. The private jet and the services of German doctors cost 79,000 euros.

In August 2020, during the protests in Belarus, Boris Zimin donated to Belarus Solidarity Foundation.

After 24 February 2022, Zimin Foundation started several programs for refugees from Ukraine and Russia. They are intended for scientists, students, and journalists. Boris Zimin is a member of The Russian Anti-War Committee and of The Russian Action Committee. Both organizations oppose the war unleashed by Putin and support the unity of anti-war and pro-democracy Russians.

On September 2, 2022, the Ministry of Justice included Boris Zimin in the list of individuals acting as a foreign agent.

In April 2025, he was sentenced in absentia to nine years in prison on false fabricated charges (which he considers politically motivated).

In November 2025, he was added to Russia’s list of terrorists and extremists, presumably due to his entering The Russian Anti-War Committee.

On 5 August 2025, the Russian Prosecutor General’s Office designated Zimin Foundation an “undesirable organisation”.

In October 2026, Boris Zimin was added to the list of individuals subject to restrictive measures (on August 4 of this year, the federal law on temporary restrictions for individuals who evade serving their sentences outside the country—Federal Law No. 284-FZ—went into effect).

== Criminal Prosecution ==
In early 2023, the Russian Ministry of Internal Affairs placed Boris Zimin on the federal wanted list. According to RBC, the criminal case against Zimin is related to the alienation of ordinary shares of the parent company of the car-sharing service BelkaCar. The damages are estimated at 47 million euros.

On January 11, 2023, the Tverskoy District Court ordered Zimin’s arrest in absentia. Zimin himself believes that the case is politically motivated.

On April 22, 2025, the Preobrazhensky District Court of Moscow sentenced Boris Zimin in absentia to nine years in prison on fraud charges.
