= Enlightener Prize =

Award

The Enlightener Prize for Russian-language non-fiction literature ("Prosvetitel"; Премия в области литературы нон-фикшн «Просветитель») is a literary prize created by the Dynasty Foundation in 2008 by Dmitry Zimin. After the Dynasty Foundation was closed, the project was being supported by the Zimin Foundation. After that project received financial independence.

The Enlightener Prize has made a significant contribution to popularizing non-fiction literature in Russia and became the first award in this field. It focuses not only on the monetary prize, but also on informational support for the laureates. The award's key mission is to introduce readers to the best educational books and draw attention to the non-fiction genre itself.

The prize is 720,000 rubles (approximately $11,386 as of July 2019), authors of the short-listed books will receive 120,000 rubles ($1,900), and publishers of the winning books will receive 130,000 rubles ($2,000) for promoting the books in the market. The purpose of the Prize is to support Russian-speaking scientists and technical writers, who are able to talk simply about the newest discoveries and research.

The third Thursday of November is officially considered Enlightener Day and that is when the ceremony takes place every year.

The 2014 jury was led by the critic Alexander F. Gavrilov.

== Award process ==
Over 150 books are submitted into the competition every year. The Organizing Committee creates a list of 25 works in two categories: Humanities and Natural and Exact Sciences. Topics include ideas, theories, interesting facts, and new discoveries, and they have to be at least 30,000 words. The application must be accompanied by a document which confirms that the author agrees with their participation in the competition, and each book or manuscript can be submitted only once. After that, an independent jury selects 8 short-listed books. A book nominated for the prize must be written in Russian

The Enlightener Prize Council was created in 2012, and it includes jury members, former finalists and authors. Their role is to assist the organizing committee in nominating and evaluating the books submitted.
