= Oleksandr Komarov (businessman) =

Ukrainian telecommunications top-level manager

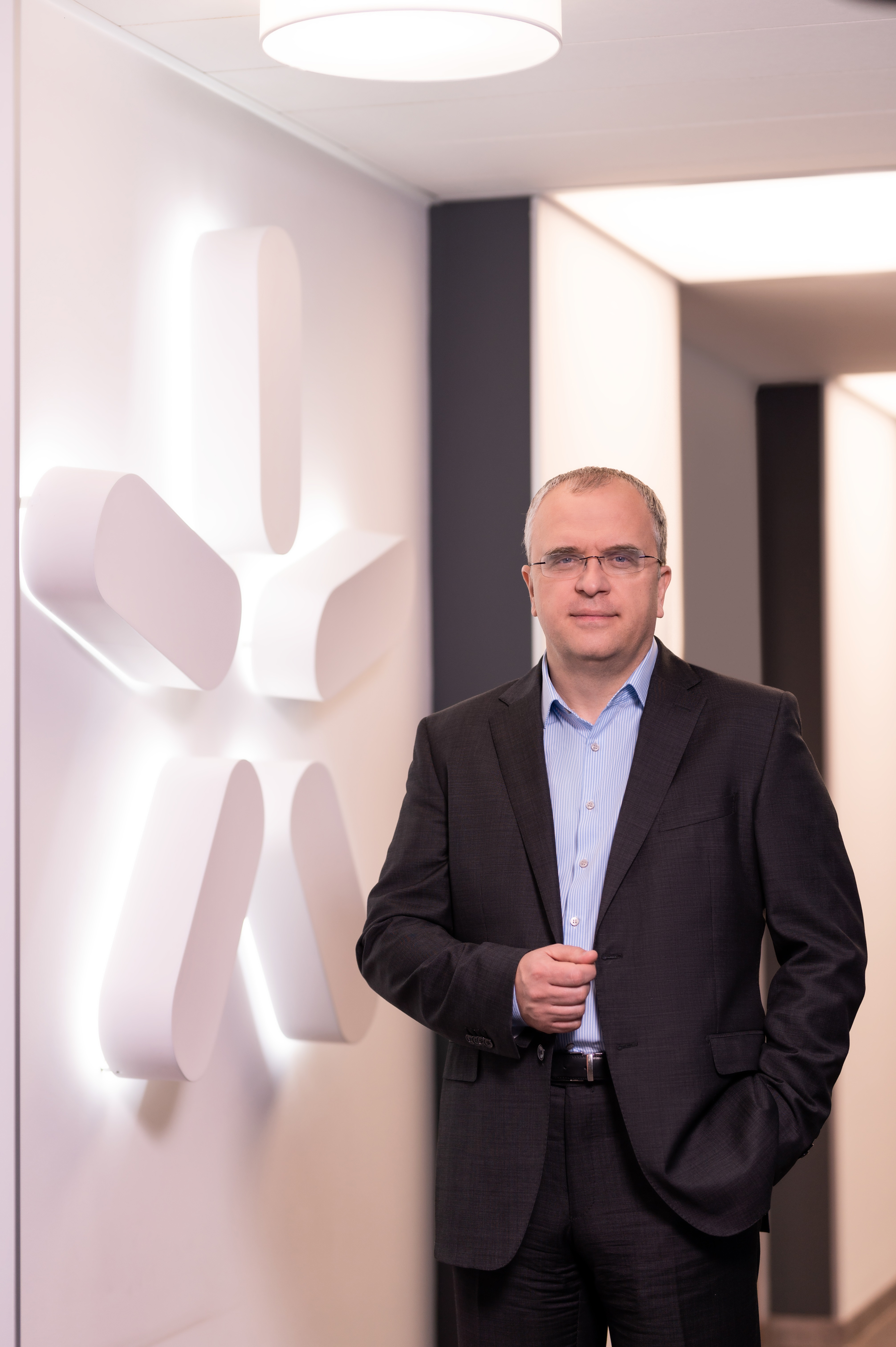
- Born: 7 November 1972 (age 53)
- Education: Kyiv Polytechnic Institute; Chartered Institute of Marketing; Stockholm School of Economics (MBA)
- Occupation: CEO Kyivstar

Oleksandr Komarov (Ukrainian: Олександр Комаров; born on November 7, 1972) is a Ukrainian telecommunications top-level manager, CEO of Kyivstar — No. 1 telecom operator in Ukraine with about 26 million subscribers.

== Career ==
Komarov graduated from Kyiv Polytechnic Institute. In 2001, he received a certificate from the Britain's Chartered Institute of Marketing (CIM). He holds an MBA degree from the Stockholm School of Economics.

He started his career in 1994 at the Kyiv Research Center of the Military Institute of Management and Communications. Since 1997, he worked at Globalstar in marketing and sales. In 2002, he was invited to the position of Business Development Director at Adell Saatchi & Saatchi. Since 2004, he was the CEO of the advertising agency, later heading the Video International Group in Ukraine.

Since 2007, he was the CEO of GroupM, Ukraine's largest advertising group.

In July 2013, he received an invitation from Beeline Kazakhstan to become the Chief Commercial Director of the company. Since January 2016, he was the head of Beeline Kazakhstan. During his stint at the helm of Beeline Kazakhstan, Oleksandr turned it into a national industry leader, introducing a number of new digital services that quickly gained popularity among subscribers. At the end of 2018, Beeline Kazakhstan took the first place among Kazakhstan’s telecom carriers in terms of subscriber base for the first time in its 20-year history. Under Komarov's leadership, the company achieved significant success in the development of broadband Internet access networks (4G, LTE) and the introduction of innovative telecom services.

Since July 20, 2018, while being Executive Director of Beeline Kazakhstan, he was simultaneously acting as president of the Ukrainian telecom operator Kyivstar.

On December 6, 2018, VEON Group made an official announcement that Komarov was appointed as a president of Kyivstar. At the time when Komarov first headed Kyivstar, 900 MHz 4G cellular services were at the start of a rapid development in Ukraine, which became possible thanks to Kyivstar donating part of the frequency range for other telecom industry members.

In August 2025, Komarov led Kyivstar's Nasdaq IPO, making it the first Ukrainian company to list on a U.S. stock exchange.

== Social and teaching activities ==
Komarov devoted 10 years of his life to teaching — he lectured on strategic management and marketing at the invitation of Kyiv's International Institute of Business.

In 2019-2020, Komarov was a member of the Board of Directors of American Chamber of Commerce in Ukraine. He is a member of the Supervisory board of the Chamber.

== Personal ==
Komarov is married and has 3 children.

Komarov has his own YouTube project, its core idea to attract famous and prominent people to conversations.

He practices jogging and tennis.

== Awards and honours ==
- Head the best leaders ranking according to Forbes Ukraine
- Lead Ideal Managers, a ranking of the telecom industry's best executives
- Made it into the top 10 executives of Ukraine according to the “TOP 100. Ratings of the Greatest”
- Made it into TOP 20 most successful leaders of Ukrainian companies.
