= Margulan Seisembayev =

Kazakh businessman

Margulan Seissembayev Марғұлан Қалиұлы Сейсембаев

Personal details
- Born: 2 November 1966 (age 59) Zhezkazgan, Kazakh SSR, Soviet Union (now Kazakhstan)
- Citizenship: Kazakhstan
- Spouse: Saule Seisembayeva
- Children: daughters: Zere, Dameli and Almira

Margulan Seissembayev (Kazakh: Марғұлан Қалиұлы Сейсембаев, Marğūlan Qaliūly Seisembaev; born 2 November 1966) is a Kazakhstan businessman, Kazakh investor, traveler, public figure and businessman.

- Early Life and Education Margulan Seisembayev was born in the Ulytau District of the Jezkazgan Region, where he spent his childhood and youth. He is a descendant of the Baganaly clan of the Naiman tribe. His father worked as an agronomist, and the family frequently relocated to different state farms within the Jezkazgan Region. After completing high school, Seisembayev worked as a shepherd at the Sary-Kengir state farm and later as a senior beekeeper at the Amangeldy state farm in the Ulytau District. Seisembayev pursued higher education at Kirov State University, majoring in Law, from 1987. He independently learned English and worked as a translator between Kazakh and English. He completed his fourth and fifth years as an external student and graduated with honors ahead of schedule in 1991. Career Immediately after graduation, Seisembayev ventured into business, establishing the private commercial company Seimar Commerce, which primarily focused on exporting Kazakh wheat to CIS countries. He served as the Chairman of the Board for JSC "Alliance Bank" until December 31, 2009. Seisembayev has also held various leadership roles and founded several organizations, including: - President of the Chess Federation of the Republic of Kazakhstan (2007-2009) - Founder of the non-profit charity foundation "Seimar Social Fund" - Co-founder of the private English school "Haileybury School Almaty" in Kazakhstan - Sponsor of the entrepreneurial university "Almaty Management University" (AlmaU) In September 2020, Seisembayev met with Ukrainian president Volodymyr Zelenskyy and announced his support for Ukraine's reform initiatives.

== Early life ==
Margulan Seissembayev was born to his mother, Raushan Beysekovna Seissembayeva (5 May 1934 – 22 May 2002), and his father, Gali Jienbayevich Seissembayev (2 November 1921 – 2 June 2007), a World War II veteran. His parents worked at a collective farm in the Jezkazgan region. He graduated from school in 1980 and worked as a herder from 1983 to 1984, then as a hiver from 1984 to 1985. Seissembayev served in the Army as a squad leader from 1985 to 1987. He graduated from Kirov Kazakh State University in 1991 with a degree in law studies.

== Business career ==
In the beginning of the 1990s, Seissembayev founded his own company "Seimar" which later included a financial holding, agriculture companies, telecommunication enterprises and others. In 2000 Margulan Seissembayev became a chairman of Seimar company. In 2002 Seissembayev have bought "K-Mobile", a telecommunications operator. In 2003 he became a chairman of the company "Rice of Kazakhstan". In 2004 Seissembayev sold "K-Mobile" to "Vimpelcom" for $425 mln. At that moment "K-Mobile" had over 600,000 subscribers.

In the 1990s he purchased and headed the commercial "Alliance Bank". In 2007 it became one of the first banks in Kazakhstan to issue IPO in London Stock Exchange.

In 2009, during the world financial crisis, "Alliance Bank" owned by Seissembayev was nationalized, with him being accused of stealing and laundering money. Margulan Seissembayev had to leave Kazakhstan for some time, but in 2010 he returned.

During the trials and investigations held in Kazakhstan, Great Britain, Lichtenstein, Switzerland and UAE, Margulan Seissembayev and his team were justified and freed from paying any compensation in favor of Alliance Bank.

Since August 2013 - Margulan is Managing Partner of "Asadel Capital" hedge fund. In 2016, Margulan launched a private equity fund in Singapore called Asadel Partners PEF.

Timeline:

- 1991 — Founded private company "Seimar Commerce", which was exporting wheat (crops) to CIS countries (Commonwealth of Independent States, ex-USSR republics).
- 1992 — Established Concern "Seimar"
- 1995-1997 — Started to buy up poultry farms across Kazakhstan and in 1998 established company "Almatykus" (later renamed to "Alel Agro"), where Askar Galin (brother of Margulan) was appointed as the CEO.
- 2000—2001 – Chairman of the board JSC "Seimar"
- From 2001 — President of JSC "Seimar"
- 2002 — Buys 100% stake in "Kartel" (one of two cellular mobile communication providers in Kazakhstan) for US$12 million. At the time of takeover, company owed US$175 million to Motorola and also had a debt of around US$67 million in Kazakhstani banks. The number of subscribers was 220 thousand. The equipment was brought from Turkey, where it had been previously used by one of the former shareholders and was in bad condition.
- From 2003 — Chairman of the board JSC "Rice Kazakhstan"
- 2003-2005 — Chairman of the board JSC "Alel Agro"
- October 3, 2003 - 26 April 2004 — Member of the board of directors of JSC "Kazakhstan Kagazi"
- 2004— Sells cellular provider "Kartel" to Russian company "VimpelCom" for $425 million USD (with the deduction of net debt of US$75 million). By that time all outstanding debts to Motorola had been paid, all Kazakhstani cities have been covered by cellular connection, number of subscribers exceeded 600 thousand.
- 2004 — Buys stake in Kyrgyzstani cellular provider "Bitel".
- 2005 — Sells 51% stake in «Bitel» to Russian company МТС for US$150 million.
- July 17, 2007 — JSC "Alliance Bank" held its IPO (Initial Public Offering) on LSE (London Stock Exchange). After initial public offering "Alliance Bank" was valued at US$4 billion.
- As a result of IPO "Seimar Alliance" raised US$700 million by selling 17% stake in «Alliance Bank».
- By the end of 2007 "Alliance Bank" equity capital reached US$1 billion 350 million.
- In 2007 total equity capital of JSC "Financial Corporation Seimar Alliance" reached US$1 billion 850 million.
- 2007 — JSC "Alliance Bank" earned highest-ever recorded after-tax profit — US$350 million.
- From November 2007 to October 2008 — chairman of the board and member of the board of directors of JSC "Financial Corporation Seimar Alliance".
- From November 2008 — Chairman of the board of directors of "Financial Corporation Seimar Alliance".
- February 2, 2009 — Controlling stake of "Alliance Bank" handed over for trust management to NWF (National Welfare Fund) "Samruk-Kazina" (Government of the Republic of Kazakhstan).
- June 20, 2009 — Margulan Seissembayev leaves Kazakhstan.
- July 2, 2009 — State prosecutor of Liechtenstein at the request of third parties has initiated a criminal investigation on suspicions of embezzlement and money laundering of "Alliance Bank".
- September 2, 2009 Margulan Seissembayev stated «I decided not to come back, because there is no real guarantee that the situation will develop in a rightful manner. In my opinion, there is a fundamental interest of some people to make me accountable for this situation...».
- September 4, 2009 — State Attorney of Zurich initiated the investigation on suspicions of embezzlement and money laundering of "Alliance Bank".
- September 10, 2009 — The Swiss Federal Police filed a complaint to the public prosecutor in Zurich on a mission to launch a criminal investigation against Margulan and Yerlan Seissembayev on suspicions of embezzlement and money laundering of "Alliance Bank".
- October 13, 2009 — A criminal case was opened against Margulan on charges of organizing and directing a criminal group with the aim of embezzling funds "Alliance Bank" on the basis of Article 235 of the Criminal Code of the Republic of Kazakhstan (the creation and management of an organized criminal group or criminal community (criminal organization).
- October 28, 2009 — Margulan Seissembayev, his brothers and former top management of the bank (Zh.Ertaeva, A.Ageeva, D.Kereybaeva, Igor Ivanov and others.) were charged with unlawful issuance of guarantees, embezzlement, money laundering, abuse of office, illegal use of funds of the bank, the creation of an organized criminal group.
- November 4, 2009 — Head State Prosecutor of Zurich sends a letter to the HSBC Bank demanding freezing of several bank accounts. In the letter, the State Prosecutor in Zurich also mentioned that he is working closely with the Federal Office of the Swiss Department of Justice with a view to understand the actual charges against Margulan Seissembayev.
- December 27, 2009 — Margulan Seissembayev, his brothers and former top management of the "Alliance Bank" (Zh.Ertaeva, A.Ageeva, D.Kereybaeva, Igor Ivanov, and others) have been charged with a crime under paragraph "b" part 3 of Article 176 of the Criminal Code (misappropriation i.e. theft, someone else's property entrusted to the offender, a group of persons by prior conspiracy, using his official position, on a large scale).
- April 10, 2010 — The Prosecutor's Office of Kazakhstan also filed against Margulan a criminal case under paragraph (3) (c) of Article 193 of the Criminal Code (legalization of money or other property acquired by illegal means).
- May 7, 2010 — charged under paragraph "b" part 3 of Article 176 of the Criminal Code in respect to Margulan Seissembayev was changed to a charge under paragraph 1 of Article 220 of the Criminal Code (illegal use of funds JSC "Alliance Bank") and Article 182 (Part 3) (causing damage to property by deception or abuse of trust) in the absence of events of crime. Also, May 7, 2010 Office of Public Prosecutor of Kazakhstan stopped criminal proceedings against Margulan Seissembayev, his brothers and some of the former top managers of the Bank under articles 193 (part 3) and 235 (part 1) of the Criminal Code in the absence of corpus delicti.
- May 12, 2010 — investigation in Kazakhstan removes charges on Article 193, part 3, "The legalization of money or other property acquired by illegal means," Article 176 "Misappropriation or embezzlement of entrusted property ', Part 3 of Article 235 "Creating and leadership of an organized criminal group or criminal community (criminal organization) participation in a criminal association" in the absence of corpus delicti.
- June 11, 2010 — international auditing company BDO forensic services, specializing in financial investigations, presented the audit report on the activities of Seissembayev Margulan and the use of funds of the bank.
- August 5, 2010 - after receiving a response from the Federal Department of Justice and the Police of Switzerland and studying all materials concerning the activities Seissembayev Margulan, State Attorney in Zurich has stopped the investigation because of the absence of evidence of a crime and refused to open a criminal case on suspicion of money laundering.
- August 17, 2010 — District Court for the Principality of Liechtenstein has stopped pre-investigation on suspicion Margulan Seissembayev of abuse of office, and also on suspicion of money laundering in the absence of evidence of a crime.
- October 26, 2010 — Margulan Seissembayev voluntarily returned to Kazakhstan to facilitate the investigation and to participate in investigative actions.
- January 8, 2011 — case against Seissembayev Margulan and former top managers of JSC "Alliance Bank" is handed over to Medeu District Court of Almaty, Kazakhstan.
- April 5, 2011 — JSC «Alliance Bank» filed a lawsuit in the High Court of England, accusing Seissembayev Margulan, his brothers and former top managers of the bank of money laundering, fraud and embezzlement of bank funds. The High Court of England issued an order to freeze all assets Seissembayev Margulan, his brothers, and the top management of the bank worldwide.
- July 8, 2011 — after a six-month trial in an open court of Medeu District Court acquitted Seissembayev Margulan under Art. 182 (causing damage to property by deception or abuse of trust) and recognized Seissembayev Margulan guilty under Art. 220 (illegal use of funds by issuing bank guarantees). The court sentenced Seissembayev Margulan to two years of imprisonment with the prohibition to hold management positions in the banking sector for 2 years and the payment in favor of JSC "Alliance Bank" 192 billion tenge (Kazakhstani currency).
- September 15, 2011 — Almaty Appellate Court cancels the verdict of Medeu District Court of Almaty in payment part of JSC "Alliance Bank" 192 billion tenge claim and recognized JSC "Alliance Bank" right to satisfy its claims from guilty persons in the Civil Court proceedings.
- September 23, 2011 — JSC "Alliance Bank" has filed a petition to the Supreme Court of the Republic of Kazakhstan.
- December 14, 2011 — England's High Court rules in favor of Seissembayev Margulan, his brothers and former top management of the bank, as well as denying the claim of JSC "Alliance Bank" on the basis of lack of jurisdiction of the court for consideration on the merits of the claim.
- January 17, 2012 — "Alliance Bank" appeals to the Court of Appeal of England on the decision of the trial court.
- February 14, 2012 — The Supreme Court of the Republic of Kazakhstan decides to leave "Alliance Bank" application without consideration.
- February 14, 2012 — The Supreme Court of the Republic of Kazakhstan decided to leave the petition "Alliance Bank" without consideration.
- February 15, 2012 — Bostandyk District Court of Almaty makes a decision on the release from punishment under Article 220 Part 1 of the Criminal Code of the Republic of Kazakhstan appointed on a sentence of Medeu District Court of Almaty in the Law of the Republic of Kazakhstan on amnesty.
- June 17, 2012 — слушание в Апелляционном суде Англии.
- December 12, 2012 — Margulan Seissembayev wins his case in the Court of Appeal of England. The court ruled in favor of Seissembayev Margulan, his brothers and former top management of the bank (a total of 15 respondents). In particular, the Court of Appeal in London has come to the conclusion that it has no grounds and jurisdiction to consider the dispute on the merits between JSC "Alliance Bank" and 15 defendants, of which financial institution accused of large-scale fraud, conspiracy and damage to the amount of 1, 1 billion dollars. Also, the London Court of Appeal ruled to unfreeze assets Margulan Seissembayev and other defendants worldwide. In addition, the London Court of Appeal ordered the JSC "Alliance Bank" fully reimburse all legal costs Margulan Seissembayev and other defendants that they suffered during the proceedings in the first and second courts of London. Also, the judge of the London Court of Appeal denied Kazakhstani bank permission to appeal to the Supreme Court in London. However, the JSC "Alliance Bank" have the ability until January 11, 2013 to apply for such a permit directly to the Supreme Court in London (which is the highest and final court in the British judicial system).
- Since August 2013 — managing partner of hedge fund "Asadel Capital".
- Since October 2015 — managing partner at Asadel Partners Private Equity Fund (PEF) Kazakhstan/Ukraine.
- Since February 2016 — initiator of and team leader at Nomad Explorer.
- Since April 2016 — chairman of the Board of Trustees of Almaly Zhumak Foundation.
- Since February 2017 — managing partner and Chair of the Investment Committee of Asadel Venture Fund.
- Since March 2017 — member of the Board of Trustees and shareholder of AlmaU university.
- Since April 2017 — chairman of the Board of Trustees of Ak Boken Foundation.
- December 24, 2018 Interview for Tengrinews.
- In 2020, Margulan Seissembayev joined Mikheil Saakashvili's reform committee in Ukraine

== Charity work ==
Margulan Seisembayev has founded Seimar Social Fund, a non-commercial charitable organization working in various directions: from support of children with serious diseases to the financing of scientific books. He is a co-founder of Sponsors Club of Kazakhstan which included seven young businessmen of Kazakhstan: Bulat Abylov — the chairman of the Club, Raimbek Batalov, Erken Kaliev, Kairat Satilganov, Margulan Seisembayev, Nurlan Smagulov, Nurjan Subhanberdin. The Sponsors Club had established the independent award "Tarlan" for distinguished personalities of Kazakhstan in literature, arts and science in 7 nominations from 2000 until 2007.

In 2012 Seisembayev supported issue of the unique atlas "From Altai to Kaspiy", describing archeological, historical and cultural monuments of Kazakhstan.

Seisembayev is also a co-founder and patron of the private English school, Haileybury Almaty. He was also a co-founder and member of Kazakhstan’s Club of Patrons which founded the independent prize Tarlan awarded for achievements in art, science and literature from 2000 to 2007.

Margulan Seisembayev was the president of the Kazakhstan Chess Federation, and also founded Seimar Open, the Kazakhstan golf championship.

== Other information ==
He has a wife, Saule and three daughters Zere, Dameli, Almira. His sporting hobbies include hunting, skiing, flying, and playing golf. Seisembayev speaks Kazakh, Russian, Italian and English languages.
