= Telephone numbers in Vietnam =

- Country: Vietnam
- Continent: Asia
- Regulator: MIC
- Numbering plan type: Open
- NSN length: 1 to 10
- Format: 02xx xxx xxxx (geographical); 09/08/07/05/03xx xxx xxx (mobile)
- Country code: 84
- International access: 00
- Long-distance: 0

Vietnam's telephone country code is 84. The country is divided into many regions with individual area codes for landlines, as well as a separate format for mobile telephone numbers. The seven emergency telephone numbers are 111 (child protection), 112 (life-saving services), 113 (police), 114 (firefighter), 115 (first aid), 117 (preventing domestic violence), and 156 (reporting spam messages, spam calls, calls with signs of fraud, and information lookup).

When dialing a number within the same province or city, only the subscriber number is dialed.

When dialing from a different province/city or from a mobile phone, the dialing format is 0 + area code + subscriber number.

Area codes may have from two to three digits, while subscriber numbers may have from seven to eight digits, in total, the land line telephone numbers have 10 digits.

== Area codes ==
20x	21x	22x	23x	24x	25x	26x	27x	28x	29x
200 –	210; Phú Thọ	220; Hải Dương	230 –	240 –	250 –	260; Kon Tum	270; Vĩnh Long	280 –	290; Cà Mau
201 –	211; Vĩnh Phúc	221; Hưng Yên	231 –	241 –	251; Đồng Nai	261; Đăk Nông	271; Bình Phước	281 –	291; Bạc Liêu
202 –	212; Sơn La	222; Bắc Ninh	232; Quảng Bình	242; Hanoi (Viettel landlines)	252; Bình Thuận	262; Đắk Lắk	272; Long An	282; Ho Chi Minh City (Viettel landlines)	292; Cần Thơ
203; Quảng Ninh	213; Lai Châu	223 –	233; Quảng Trị	243; Hanoi (VNPT landlines)	253 –	263; Lâm Đồng	273; Tiền Giang	283; Ho Chi Minh City (VNPT landlines)	293; Hậu Giang
204; Bắc Giang	214; Lào Cai	224 –	234; Thừa Thiên Huế	244; Hanoi (VTC landlines)	254; Bà Rịa–Vũng Tàu	264 –	274; Bình Dương	284; Ho Chi Minh City (VTC landlines)	294; Trà Vinh
205; Lạng Sơn	215; Điện Biên	225; Hải Phòng	235; Quảng Nam	245; Hanoi (SPT landlines)	255; Quảng Ngãi	265 –	275; Bến Tre	285; Ho Chi Minh City (SPT landlines)	295 –
206; Cao Bằng	216; Yên Bái	226; Hà Nam	236; Đà Nẵng	246 (2)(3)(6); Hanoi (Viettel landlines)	256; Bình Định	266 –	276; Tây Ninh	286 (2)(3)(6); Ho Chi Minh City (Viettel landlines)	296; An Giang
207; Tuyên Quang	217 –	227; Thái Bình	237; Thanh Hóa	247 (1); Hanoi (CMC Telecom landlines) 247 (3); Hanoi (FPT Telecom landlines)	257; Phú Yên	267 –	277; Đồng Tháp	287 (1); Ho Chi Minh City (CMC Telecom landlines) 287 (3); Ho Chi Minh City (FPT Telecom landlines)	297; Kiên Giang
208; Thái Nguyên	218; Hòa Bình	228; Nam Định	238; Nghệ An	248; Hanoi (VNPT landlines)	258; Khánh Hòa	268 –	278 –	288 –	298 –
209; Bắc Kạn	219; Hà Giang	229; Ninh Bình	239; Hà Tĩnh	249 –	259; Ninh Thuận	269; Gia Lai	279 –	289 –	299; Sóc Trăng

=== Area code 69 ===
69 is the special area code dedicated for the Ministry of Defence (Vietnam) and the Ministry of Public Security (Vietnam).

== Mobile telephone numbers ==
In Vietnam, mobile phone numbers follow the format 09x-xxxxxxx or new prefixes: 03x, 05x, 07x, 08x.

- The first 0 is the trunk code.
- The next two digits (3x, 5x, 7x, 8x or 9x) specify the mobile phone operator. Some mobile phone operators have been given more than one operator code.

3x	5x	6x	7x	8x	9x
			70 – MobiFone		90 – MobiFone
				81 – Vinaphone	91 – Vinaphone
32 – Viettel	52 – Vietnamobile			82 – Vinaphone	92 – Vietnamobile (previously HT Mobile)
33 – Viettel				83 – Vinaphone	93 – MobiFone
34 – Viettel				84 – Vinaphone	94 – Vinaphone
35 – Viettel	55 – Wintel (previously Reddi)			85 – Vinaphone	95 – Viettel (previously S-Fone)
36 – Viettel	56 – Vietnamobile		76 – MobiFone	86 – Viettel	96 – Viettel (previously EVN Telecom)
37 – Viettel		672xxxxxx (New VSAT prefix)	77 – MobiFone	87 – Indochina Telecom	97 – Viettel
38 – Viettel	58 – Vietnamobile		78 – MobiFone	88 – Vinaphone	98 – Viettel
39 – Viettel	59 – Gmobile		79 – MobiFone	89 – MobiFone	99 – Gmobile (previously Beeline)

In Circular No. 22/2014/TT-BTTTT dated 22 December 2014, all 11-digit mobile phone numbers will be changed into 10-digit numbers, the Ministry of Information and Communications announced in a recent press release. All 11-digit numbers with prefixes '012' of VinaPhone and MobiFone, '016' of Viettel, '018' of Vietnamobile and '019' of GMobile will be converted into 10-digit ones. To minimize possible loss of communications before, during and after network code change, each stage must consist of four steps as follows:

- Make public announcement at least 60 days before the network code change starts.
- Take technical measures to enable simultaneous dialing for 60 days since the network code change starts. Example: users may dial old or new network code 0986888888 to Viettel.
- Maintain the notification sound (since the time of simultaneous dialing closes). During this time, any call using new network codes shall be normally processed and any call using old network codes shall be routed to the notification sound.
- Stop maintaining the notification sound: Calls shall be successful processed only through new network codes. To ensure changing of network codes is quick and favorable for businesses and service users, steps aforementioned should be implemented for one stage.

In Communication of 31.V.2018 the Ministry of Information and Communications (MIC), Hanoi, announced a change on mobile telephony services, where all previous telephone numbers starting with 012x (mobile telephony services numbers) are moving into the other mobile number areas (e.g. to 07x or 08x etc.).

== Emergency contact numbers ==
Used in major centers

- 111 – Child Protection (In collaboration with the UK Government, the number now handles human trafficking calls as well as child welfare calls.)
- 112 – Search and Rescue services (Plans are underway to integrate 113, 114, 115 into 112)
- 113 – Police
- 114 – Fire & Rescue
- 115 – Ambulance Services

== 1900 number allocation ==
1900 01XX, 1900 02XX, 1900 03XX – GTEL

1900 06XXXX – GTEL

1900 12XX, 1900 15XX, 1900 17XX, 1900 18XX – VNPT

1900 20XX, 1900 21XX, 1900 22XX – CMC Telecom

1900 54XXXX, 1900 55XXXX, 1900 56XXXX, 1900 57XXXX, 1900 58XXXX, 1900 59XXXX – VNPT

1900 63XXXX – FPT Telecom

1900 66XX, 1900 68XX – FPT Telecom

1900 70XX, 1900 71XX, 1900 72XX – SPT

1900 75XXXX, 1900 77XXXX – SPT

1900 80XX, 1900 86XX, 1900 89XX – Viettel

1900 90XX, 1900 92XX, 1900 94XX – Viettel

1900 96XXXX – Viettel

== Previous area codes not currently in use ==
- 120 – Mobifone
- 121 – Mobifone
- 122 – Mobifone
- 123 – Vinaphone
- 124 – Vinaphone
- 125 – Vinaphone
- 126 – Mobifone
- 127 – Vinaphone
- 128 – Mobifone
- 129 – Vinaphone
- 162 – Viettel
- 163 – Viettel
- 164 – Viettel
- 165 – Viettel
- 166 – Viettel
- 167 – Viettel
- 168 – Viettel
- 169 – Viettel
- 186 – Vietnamobile
- 188 – Vietnamobile
- 199 – Gmobile
- 20 – Lào Cai province (discontinued)
- 210 – Phú Thọ province
- 211 – Vĩnh Phúc province
- 218 – Hòa Bình province
- 219 – Hà Giang province
- 22 – Sơn La province (discontinued)
- 230 – Điện Biên province (discontinued)
- 231 – Lai Châu province (discontinued)
- 240 – Bắc Giang province (discontinued)
- 241 – Bắc Ninh province (discontinued)
- 25 – Lạng Sơn province (discontinued)
- 26 – Cao Bằng province (discontinued)
- 27 – Tuyên Quang province (discontinued)
- 280 – Thái Nguyên province (discontinued)
- 281 – Bắc Kạn province (discontinued)
- 29 – Yên Bái province (discontinued)
- 30 – Ninh Bình province (discontinued)
- 31 – Hai Phong city (discontinued)
- 320 – Hải Dương province (discontinued)
- 321 – Hưng Yên province (discontinued)
- 33 – Quảng Ninh province (discontinued)
- 350 – Nam Định province (discontinued)
- 351 – Hà Nam province (discontinued)
- 36 – Thái Bình province (discontinued)
- 37 – Thanh Hóa province (discontinued)
- 38 – Nghệ An province (discontinued)
- 39 – Hà Tĩnh province (discontinued)
- 4 – Hanoi (discontinued)
- 500 – Đắk Lắk province (discontinued)
- 501 – Đắk Nông province (discontinued)
- 510 – Quảng Nam province (discontinued)
- 511 – Da Nang city (discontinued)
- 52 – Quảng Bình province (discontinued)
- 53 – Quảng Trị province (discontinued)
- 54 – Thừa Thiên Huế province (discontinued)
- 55 – Quảng Ngãi province (discontinued)
- 56 – Bình Định province (discontinued)
- 57 – Phú Yên province (discontinued)
- 58 – Khánh Hòa province (discontinued)
- 59 – Gia Lai province (discontinued)
- 60 – Kon Tum province (discontinued)
- 61 – Đồng Nai province (discontinued)
- 62 – Bình Thuận province (discontinued)
- 63 – Lâm Đồng province (discontinued)
- 64 – Bà Rịa–Vũng Tàu province (discontinued)
- 650 – Bình Dương province (discontinued)
- 651 – Bình Phước province (discontinued)
- 66 – Tây Ninh province (discontinued)
- 67 – Đồng Tháp province (discontinued)
- 68 – Ninh Thuận province (discontinued)
- 70 – Vĩnh Long province (discontinued)
- 710 – Cần Thơ city (discontinued)
- 711 – Hậu Giang province (discontinued)
- 72 – Long An province (discontinued)
- 73 – Tiền Giang province (discontinued)
- 74 – Trà Vinh province (discontinued)
- 75 – Bến Tre province (discontinued)
- 76 – An Giang province (discontinued)
- 77 – Kiên Giang province (discontinued)
- 780 – Cà Mau province (discontinued)
- 781 – Bạc Liêu province (discontinued)
- 79 – Sóc Trăng province (discontinued)
- 8 – Ho Chi Minh City (discontinued)
- 992 – VSAT
