= Egor Shuppe =

Businessperson (1971–2023)

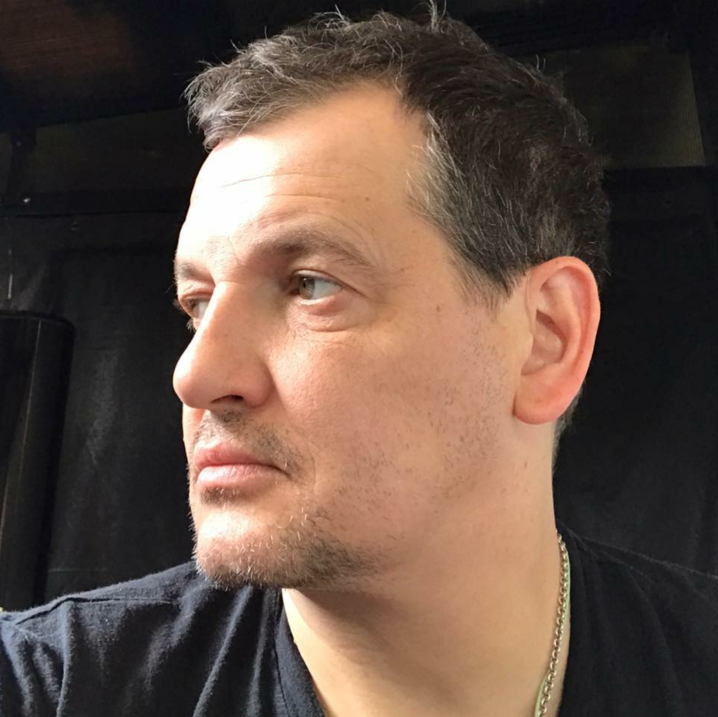
- Born: Georgy Nikolaevich Shuppe; 11 March 1971; Moscow, Russian SFSR, USSR
- Died: 5 June 2023 (aged 52); London, England
- Education: Moscow Technological University (MIREA)
- Occupations: Businessman, entrepreneur and venture investor
- Known for: Former co-owner and president of Cityline; Co-owner of Kite Ventures
- Spouse: Ekaterina Berezovskaya (m. 1997–2012)
- Children: 4 children

Georgy Nikolaevich Shuppe (Russian: Гео́ргий Никола́евич Шу́ппе, pronounced [ɡʲɪˈorɡʲɪj nʲɪkolajɨvʲɪtɕ ʂʉppʲɛ] ) was a Russian and British businessman and venture investor. He was one of the founders, owners and president of the first major Russian internet providers “Cityline”, co-founder of the first Russian online-media agency and content provider "Netskate" ("Evening internet", "Locomotive-news", "Hayloft", "Anecdotes from Russia", etc.). Partner and co-founder of the venture fund "Kite Ventures". Shuppe resided in London, England from 2004.

== Early life ==
Shuppe was born in Moscow, Russian SFSR, USSR. His father, Nikolay Georgievich Shuppe, was a doctor of science of biology at the Academy of Science of the USSR and professor.

His mother, Nadezhda Isaacovna Kikoin, was a patent specialist. She was the daughter of Isaac Konstantinovich Kikoin, academic of the Academy of Science of the USSR, physicist. He was one of the founding fathers of the Soviet nuclear program and the Kurchatov Institute, twice-awarded hero of Socialist Labour and winner of the Lenin Prize.

== Career ==
=== Early years ===
From 1977 to 1987 Shuppe studied in school No. 171 in a specialized class under the patronage of the Chemical faculty of the Moscow State University named after M.V. Lomonosov. He studied chemistry and biology.

In 1984 Shuppe became the winner of the Moscow City Chemistry Olympiad.

Between 1987 and 1989, he studied biologically active compounds at the department of Chemistry and Technology, the Institute of Fine Chemical Technologies (in 2015 it merged with the Moscow State University of information technologies, radio-technics and electronics (MIREA, MGUPI) and renamed the Moscow Technological University).

From the late 1980s Shuppe began demonstrating an interest in computers, genetics, and IT; participated in the import of the first personal computers into the USSR and later, in Russia, created the first computer department in the Institute of General Genetics named after N.I. Vavilov.

During 1991 to 1992 he worked as the deputy to the Commercial Director of the first Russian art place, Centre of Modern Art on Yakimanka, founded in 1990 by art specialist Leonid Bazhanov.

From 1991 to 1996 he became the vice president of the Trading House «Negotiant» and head of the «Magnat» holding, involved in various business projects including agriculture, creation of automobile distribution chains, design and implementation of a chain of petrol stations, etc.

=== Cityline ===
In 1996 together with Emelian Zakharov and Rafael Filinov, Shuppe founded the company Cityline, which became the first and largest private internet provider in Russia. In 1997 Damian Kudryavtsev joined the team and later in 1999, Dmitry Bosov and Maxim Barsky. Shuppe was one of the main shareholders and President of the company.

In 1996 the overall amount of Internet users in Russia was only 60,000, the Russian segment of the Internet consisting of only a few websites. In order to attract new users and increase the revenues per user (at that time access to the Internet was on a time payment basis), Cityline made a strategic decision to invest in the creation of free Russian content. That was when the company NetSkate, a production centre for new Russian online media, was established.

For the development of NetSkate projects, Anton Nossik came to Russia from Israel and Artemy Lebedev – from the USA. The design Art. Lebedev Studio and Lenta.ru started in NetSkate.

Among the most popular NetSkate projects were: «The Evening Internet» by Anton Nosik, «Locomotive-news» by Alexander Gagin, «Hayloft» by Sergey Kuznetsov, «Anecdotes from Russia» by Dmitry Verner, etc.

Cityline was acquired in 2001 by Golden Telecom. At that point it had over 150,000 clients.

== Venture business in the UK ==
In 2002 Shuppe moved from Russia and from 2004, he lived and worked in London.

Shuppe acted as a business angel for a variety of hi-tech projects helping raise investments for innovative projects in Great Britain, Germany, USA and Eastern Europe.

In 2008 together with Edward Shenderovich, Shuppe created an investment fund for technological and internet projects – Kite Ventures. Over the years, the fund invested over 400 million dollars into many acclaimed projects.

Amongst the most famous projects realized by the fund is the German company, Delivery Hero, which had its IPO in July 2017 on the Frankfurt Stock Exchange and Tradeshift – a cloud service connecting the customers and sellers to companies such as Groupon, Fyber, Mydeco.com and others.

== The “Mineev case” and extradition attempt to Russia ==
On 18 August 2017 the judgement of the Westminster Magistrates’ Court discharged the request of the Russian Federation to extradite Georgy Shuppe.

The Russian investigative authorities had accused Shuppe and businessman Mikhail Nekrich, of ordering the murder of businessman Alexander Mineev. Mikhail Nekrich, in turn, claimed that representatives of the Russian Special Services had bribed him to slander Shuppe and in return, had offered to drop all charges against him.

The English court concluded that the prosecution against Mr. Shuppe in Russia was unjustified and was performed with numerous significant violations of the law. The conclusion of judge Kenneth Grant states: “I am satisfied that this case would be decided by influence and pressure on the judge to convict … whatever the strength or weakness of the prosecution case”. The court also called attention to the fact that accusations against Shuppe were based explicitly on the testimony of two witnesses, one of whom was an anonymous witness and the other - already had rejected his testimony. The Russian Federation did not challenge the court's judgment.

The court returned the paid bail to Shuppe and released him from any other restrictions.

Shuppe himself expressly denied his involvement in the «Mineev case» and insisted that, probably, he had become a victim of a collusion between the Russian Special Services and organised crime. In his opinion, one of the elements of this scheme was to use his name and status for the purpose of protraction of the investigation in Russia: whilst the investigation was in process, profits from the associated real estate had been received by individuals connected with the company FORUS; the general director of all those companies that own the property, according to the BBC, is Alexander Shibakov. Shuppe suspected that the criminals and Special Services are sharing this revenue.

== Piatigorsky’s Classes ==
From 2002 Shuppe had strong personal and business relations with the world-famous Russian and British philosopher, orientalist and writer, Alexander Piatigorsky, who also lived in London.

During the period between 2006 and 2009 Shuppe, together with Piatigorsky, created a series of philosophical seminars that were named «AMP Classes». Over 50 seminars were held and over 400 hours of audio and video were recorded. The texts of the AMP Classes are the so-called philosophical legacy of Alexander Piatigorsky.

After Piatigorsky's death in 2009 Shuppe curated and supported the works of the philosophical and creative legacy of the philosopher. For this purpose, he created the Fund of Piatigorsky's Heritage and issued philosophical Buddhist books of the philosopher and his novels.

== Personal life and death ==
From 1997 to 2012 Shuppe was married to Ekaterina Berezovskaya, daughter of Boris Berezovsky (businessman). He was a father of four.

Among his interests were philosophy, art and technologies. He participated in the creation of Anton Nossik’s charity fund, Pomogi.org.

Shuppe died on 5 June 2023, at the age of 52.
