= Roman Kravets =

Ukrainian blogger and politician (born 1994)

- Роман Кравець

People's Deputy of Ukraine
- In office 19 January 2026 – 19 January 2026
- Constituency: electoral list

Personal details
- Born: 8 July 1994 (age 31) Kherson, Ukraine
- Party: Servant of the People

Roman Oleksandrovych Kravets (Ukrainian: Роман Олександрович Кравець; born July 8, 1994 in Kherson) is a Ukrainian blogger and politician. He was recognized as a People's Deputy of Ukraine of the 9th convocation from the Servant of the People party on 19 January 2026, but refused the mandate. According to media reports, he is the administrator of the Telegram channel “Joker”.

According to the Security Service of Ukraine, Roman Kravets's Telegram channel Joker is engaged in anti-Ukrainian and State propaganda in the Russian Federation.

He is the subject of a number of journalistic investigations, where he is accused of discrediting, threatening and extorting money from Ukrainian businesses.

== Early life ==
He was born on 8 July 1994 in Kherson.

His father, Kravets Oleksandr Mykhailovych, born in 1958, is from Russia, Magadan Oblast, Susumansky District, Velikiy Khatinnykh village.

=== Education ===
He graduated from Kherson Polytechnic College of Odesa National Polytechnic University with a degree in engineering technology.

=== Early career ===
He worked on a voluntary basis as the executive director of the Dnipro Regional Youth Council and as the deputy director of information technology and security at SSL Consulting.

According to Hromadske journalists, in 2015 he helped businessman Hennadii Korban, who was running for the Verkhovna Rada in the 205th constituency (Chernihiv).

During the 2019 Ukrainian presidential election, Kravets already had certain connections among high-ranking officials. In particular, he developed a friendly relationship with Andriy Bohdan, who was then a lawyer for influential people and later became the head of the Office of the President of Ukraine. An investigation by Hromadske journalists says that Bohdan was responsible for filling the lists of the Servant of the People party and "choosing people for the last few vacancies on the list, Andriy Bohdan simply flipped through his phone book", where he stopped at Roman Kravets, whom he invited to the list with the number 153. Kravets was not elected to the Verkhovna Rada.

In January 2026, after the Verkhovna Rada prematurely terminated the powers of People’s Deputy Dmytro Natalukha, the Central Election Commission recognized Roman Kravets as an elected People’s Deputy of Ukraine from the Servant of the People party based on the results of the 2019 elections as the next candidate on the electoral list under No. 153. At the same time, Kravets announced his refusal of the parliamentary mandate.

=== Telegram channel ===
The information that Roman Kravets is the owner and chief administrator of the Joker channel first appeared in an investigation by Forbes, citing its own sources in the Office of the President of Ukraine and the Bureau of Economic Security (BES).

In a commentary to Hromadske, Roman Kravets confirmed that Joker was his Telegram channel, but he allegedly sold it two years ago. However, Kravets does not name the new owner and does not provide any documents confirming the fact of sale.

== Media activities ==
According to the Security Service of Ukraine, Roman Kravets's Telegram channel Joker is engaged in anti-Ukrainian and State propaganda in the Russian Federation. On 2 September 2022, the co-chair of the European Solidarity faction, Iryna Herashchenko, published the SSU's response to a deputy's appeal regarding the activities of pro-Russian destructive Telegram channels. The Head of the Security Service of Ukraine, Vasyl Malyuk, confirmed that "Joker and other Telegram channels have repeatedly come to the attention of the special service as being used by unidentified persons to carry out destructive information activities to the detriment of the state security of Ukraine". The fact that Joker was administered by Roman Kravets became known only in 2024. According to the Security Service of Ukraine, Joker and other pro-Russian Telegram channels are coordinated by the Main Centre of the Special Service of the General Directorate of the General Staff of the Russian Armed Forces. Russia uses such communication channels to carry out special information and psychological operations in the interests of Russians. In order to disguise their activities, pro-Russian channels often disseminate content from Ukrainian special services. For example, they publish official messages of the SSU press service, video and photo materials from the official telegram channel of the Service and the information pages of the Main Directorate of Intelligence of Ukraine.

One of Roman Kravets's first major sponsors was Vadym Stolar, a member of parliament from Viktor Medvedchuk's banned party Opposition Platform — For Life, the pro-Russian politician.

According to a Hromadske source, Roman Kravets communicates with the Office of the President of Ukraine, calls Davyd Arakhamia his "closest friend", and his channel has posted materials by the OP employees. In the past, David Arakhamia stated that he did not know the "Joker", but respected him and "wants to give him a bottle of whiskey". Advisor to the Head of the Presidential Office Mykhailo Podolyak stated that the OP does not control Telegram channels, but according to an investigation by Hromadske, Kravets was "actively assisted and facilitated by some current and former politicians and special services officers". The interlocutors say that "the motives of each of them are different. Some of them have reasons for not being touched, while others have purely mercantile ones. This is the way to create nightmares for business with the obvious purpose of creating media problems and helping to solve them". According to the source, businessmen, employees of the Presidential Office, and even heads of the Presidential Administration under Viktor Yanukovych posted paid-for materials on Roman Kravets' channel.

== Investigations ==
Roman Kravets has been the subject of a number of journalistic investigations, where he is accused of discrediting, threatening and extorting money from Ukrainian business representatives. In March 2024, Forbes published an investigation into media attacks by the anonymous Telegram channel Joker on the Ukrainian ridesharing service Uklon, and journalists first reported that Roman Kravets was the owner and chief administrator of Joker.
