= Golden Telecom =

Russian telecommunication company

Golden Telecom Inc.
- Type: Public company
- Traded as: Nasdaq: GLDN
- Industry: Telecommunications
- Founded: 1996
- Fate: Acquired
- Successor: OJSC VimpelCom
- Key people: Fabrizio Mambrini, CEO; Alexander Vinogradov, President
- Products: Internet access, mobile phones
- Number of employees: 1407 (1999)
- Website: goldentelecom.ru

Golden Telecom is an internet services provider in Russia and the Commonwealth of Independent States (CIS). It was acquired by VimpelCom in 2007.

== History ==
Founded in 1996 by the global corporation Global Telesystems ("GTS"). NYSE-listed Global TeleSystems ("GTS") was the owner of EBONE one of Europe's leading broadband optical and IP network service providers (a Tier 1 network). GTS had its IPO on the NASDAQ in 1998. In 2000, a new management including Robert A. Schriesheim as CFO, was brought in to help restructure and refocus the company. GTS was a pan-European communications services provider, backed by Alan B. Slifka and affiliates of George Soros and Soros Private Equity, with revenues of over $1 billion and operations in 20 countries in Europe. In October 1999 GTS did an IPO of on the NASDAQ of, Golden Telecom, which held communications assets in Russia, with GTS retaining a 65% interest. GTS was essentially a portfolio of communications assets in Western and Eastern Europe which went through an IPO in 1998, and subsequently experienced challenges with an over-levered balance sheet as Europe went through deregulation and from the overall fall-out of the dot.com boom and bust which impacted its customer base. In 2001, to facilitate the sale of GTS, Mr. Schriesheim helped lead it through a pre-arranged filing under Chapter 11 of the United States Bankruptcy Code (U.S.B.C.) and, in prearranged proceedings, a petition for surseance (moratorium), offering a composition, in the Netherlands to restructure its debt, in excess of $2 billion. All such proceedings were approved, confirmed and completed by March 31, 2002, as part of the sale of the company. David A. Stewart served as Senior Vice President, chief financial officer and Treasurer at that time and left Golden Telecom in 2004.

Golden Telecom was acquired by VimpelCom in 2007.

=== List of acquisitions by Golden Telecom ===
- July 2000 — IT Infoart Stars
- July 2000 — search engine aport.ru
- April 2001 – internet service providers Cityline and Uralrelcom
- March 2002 – EDN Sovintel, LCC

Golden Telecom is a brand of EDN Sovintel, LLC.

Golden Telecom built its own Federal Transit Network (FTN) in Russia. At present, the operator has fibre-optical highways Moscow-Saint Petersburg and Moscow-Nizhni Novgorod.

On March 17, 2006, the operator declared that it put into operation the fibre-optical highway Moscow-Nizhni Novgorod. The distance of the line is 485 km (301 mi). The construction of the optical highway Moscow-Nizhni Novgorod was carried out together with Open Society VimpelCom. Both companies have invested nine million dollars in the construction.

Since March 2006 Golden Telecom has been building a fibre-optical highway Nizhni Novgorod-Kazan-Ufa, with planned operation start in the end of 2006.

Company was building the largest European Wi-Fi network in Moscow, over 5.000 WAPs, made by Nortel, are installed by the end of 2006.

In 2007 the company was planning to begin construction of a fibre-optical highway Kazan-Naberezhnye Chelny-Perm-Yekaterinburg and complete the construction of line Ufa-Samara-Saratov.

== Golden Telecom LLC (Ukraine) ==
Golden Telecom LLC is the smallest GSM operator in Ukraine, although it started early by launching its GSM-1800 operation back in 1996. Its wireless network covers just two metropolitan areas: Kyiv and Odesa, lacking the national coverage of its competitors. In the early 2000s new owners (controlled by the Russian Alfa Group) shifted company's strategy, which since then has focused on providing integrated telecommunications services for businesses and other high-usage customers and telecommunications operators.

The current number of Golden Telecom's GSM postpaid and prepaid subscribers is just below 50,000 (June 2007). Even with its earlier competitive advantage, absence of the connection fee (a small flat fee, usually $0.05–$0.06, charged by Kyivstar and UMC per connection in addition to per minute rate), is not a factor anymore as new competitors (Astelit, Beeline) do not charge connection fees as well.

To cope with its limited GSM coverage, the company has recently concluded an agreement with Beeline, another trailing local mobile operator, which allows Golden Telecom's contract subscribers to roam onto Beeline's growing cellular network throughout Ukraine. This is the first national roaming agreement between mobile operators in Ukraine.

Golden Telecom LLC Ukraine is a division of Golden Telecom Inc. (NASDAQ: GLDN), which also operates a telecom business in Russia.

== Former CEO ==
- Stewart P. Reich
