= Gmobile =

Vietnamese telecommunications company

GTel Mobile
- Company type: Limited Liability (TNHH)
- Industry: Mobile telecommunications
- Founded: 17 September 2012
- Headquarters: Hanoi, Vietnam
- Key people: Nguyen Van Du (director)
- Products: Mobile networks, Telecom services
- Brands: Gmobile
- Parent: Global Telecommunications Corporation
- Website: www.gmobile.vn

Gmobile is a Vietnamese mobile network operator. The brand Gmobile is owned by GTel Mobile and is the successor of Beeline Vietnam. GTel in turn is owned by Global Telecommunications Corporation, a state-owned joint-stock company under the Ministry of Public Security.

== Market share and competitors ==
Gmobile had a market share (estimated based on revenues) of 3.2% in 2012, making it the fifth largest operator. Its main competitors are Viettel with 40.67% market share, Vinaphone with 30%, and MobiFone with 17.9%, the latter two of which are owned by VNPT. Together, the big three control almost 90% of the market. The only other significant competitor is Vietnamobile with 8%. It had 3.2 million subscribers in 2012.

== History ==
Gmobile was set up in September 2012 as successor of Beeline Vietnam. The Russian investor OJSC VimpelCom had previously left the joint-venture. VimpelCom sold its stakes that were once worth $500m for $45m.
