= Seimar Open =

Seimar Open is an annual golf championship in Kazakhstan.

The winner of the Seimar Open receives the Grand-Prix Challenge Cup, known as the "Big Egg." The Open was founded in 1998 by Margulan Seisembayev. A huge ostrich egg in a glass flask was brought back by the founder of the tournament from a business trip to South Africa. The tournaments are conducted at the "Nurtau" golf-club in Almaty.

== History ==
The Seimar Open was first held in 1998 and is one of Kazakhstan's oldest and most prestigious tournaments.

== Winners ==
The winners of the cup were in 2009 Erkin Kaliev (Kazakhstan), Alexander Strunkin (Russia), and six-time champion Shim Dong Ho (Korea). The winner of the tournament in 2006 was Minnala Shahbas (Great Britain). The winner of the tournament in 2007 was Andrey Lagaj (Kazakhstan). In 2008, the cup was won by Kim Do Yun (Korea).

Roman Morozov from Kostanay won in two categories: "Nearest to the pin" and "Longest Drive". "Nurtau" Alexander Vongay, from the children's golf academy became the vice-championship of the tournament and participated in the Kazakhstan Open European Challenge Tour.

In 2009, there was a record number of participants at the Seimar Open. Ninety-three golf players started short-gun in the first day. Korean sportsman Kang Byung Ku won the Grand-Prix challenge cup "Big Egg" with a score of 152 without HCP. The best-placed participants from Kazakhstan were Adil Mukhamedzhanov (161) and Yerkebulan Bashikov (163).

== Organizers ==
The Seimar Open was organized by the Kazakhstan Golf Federation, the Charitable Seimar Social Fund and the Coordination Volunteers Center «Komanda SOS» (created by a joint initiative of Seimar Social Fund and United Nations Volunteers).
