= Beeline (brand) =

Telecommunications brand initially introduced in 1993 in Russia

Beeline билайн
- Product type: Mobile telephony, mobile phones retailing, international telephony, broadband Internet, IPTV, city-wide Wi-Fi, domain name registrar and others
- Current owner: PJSC VimpelCom (Russia); VEON (Kazakhstan, Uzbekistan); Eldik Bank (Kyrgyzstan, since 2025)
- Introduced: 1993; 33 years ago
- Related brands: Bee+; Golden Telecom; Corbina Telecom
- Markets: Russia; Kazakhstan; Kyrgyzstan; Uzbekistan
- Website: beeline.ru (Russia); beeline.kz (Kazakhstan); beeline.kg (Kyrgyzstan); beeline.uz (Uzbekistan)

Beeline (Russian: Билайн) is a mobile network operator brand operating in Russia under PJSC VimpelCom, and in Kazakhstan and Uzbekistan under VEON Group. In Kyrgyzstan, the brand is used by Sky Mobile LLC, which operated as a VEON subsidiary until its sale to state-owned Eldik Bank in August 2025; Sky Mobile has continued to operate under the Beeline brand following the change of ownership. Beeline is Russia's fourth-largest mobile network operator, with its main competitors being MTS, MegaFon and T2.

Since 2009, PJSC VimpelCom had been a subsidiary of VimpelCom Ltd., which was renamed VEON in 2017. On 9 October 2023, VEON completed its exit from Russia through the sale of its Russian business, PJSC VimpelCom, which operated under the Beeline brand. Following the sale, VEON continued to operate in Kazakhstan, Kyrgyzstan and Uzbekistan, including through the Beeline brand.

The commercial service was launched under the Beeline brand, a brand developed by Fabela in late 1993 to differentiate the company as a youthful and fun company, rather than a technical company. The name comes from the English term "beeline", meaning the most direct way between two points. VimpelCom relaunched Beeline with the current characteristic black-and-yellow striped circle in 2005 with a campaign to associate the brand with the principles of brightness, friendliness, effectiveness, simplicity, and positive emotions; with a new slogan "Живи на яркой стороне" ("Live on the vibrant side"). According to the company, the rebranding campaign was successful in associating the brand with these principles, which it said "captured hearts and minds".

== Current Markets ==
=== Russia ===
==== History ====
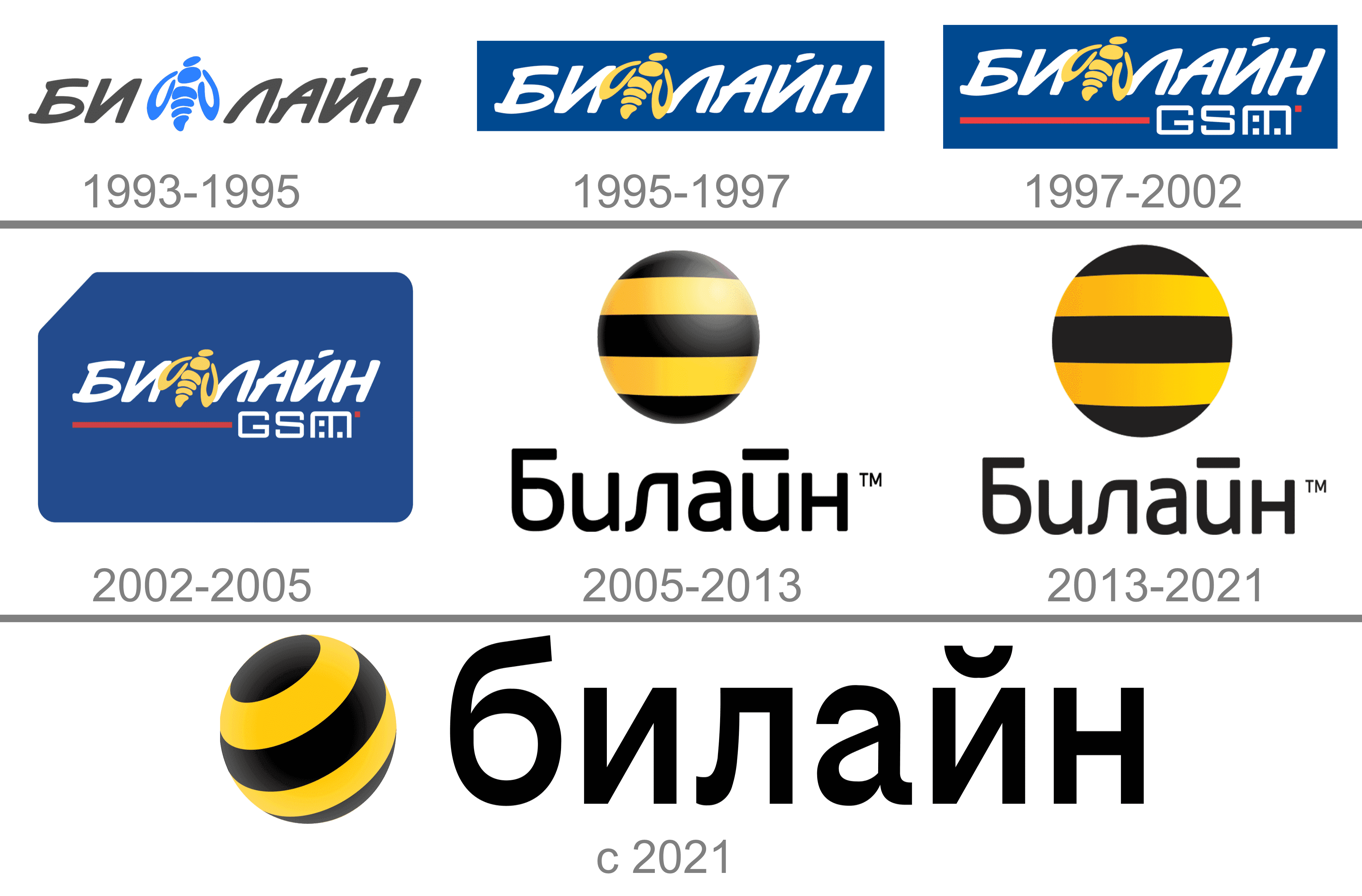
Beeline logo history

OJSC VimpelCom was founded in 1992 and initially operated AMPS/D-AMPS network in the Moscow area. In 1996 it became an Extel GSM, the first Russian company listed on the New York Stock Exchange (NYSE: VIP).

In November 2005, OJSC VimpelCom stepped further with foreign acquisitions by acquiring 100% of Ukrainian RadioSystems, a marginal Ukrainian GSM operator operating under the Wellcom and Mobi brands. The deal has been surrounded by a controversy involving two major shareholders of VimpelCom: the Russian Alfa Group and Telenor, the incumbent Norwegian telecommunications company.

By July 2008, the company's license portfolio covered a territory where 97% of Russia's population resides, as well as 100% of the territory of Kazakhstan, Ukraine, Uzbekistan, Tajikistan, Georgia and Armenia. VimpelCom also has a 49.9% stake in Euroset, the largest mobile retailer in Russia and the Commonwealth of Independent States (CIS). In May 2010, VimpelCom merged with Kyivstar to form VimpelCom Ltd., the largest telecom operator group in the CIS. Alexander Izosimov, CEO of OJSC VimpelCom, was appointed president.

In October 2021, the company announced a change in its logo and slogan for the first time in 16 years. In the new version, the name is written with a lowercase letter, and the new slogan sounds like "On your side." The international agency Wolff Olins worked on the rebranding in 2005, and the company's employees were involved in the development of the updated brand with the participation of the Contrapunto creative agency from the BBDO group. The font design studio Contrast Foundry has also developed a new Beeline font. The advertising campaign for the update was prepared by Leo Burnett Moscow (part of Publicis Groupe Russia).

In August 2024, Beeline abandoned the 3G frequency range in Moscow, the first Russian mobile operator to complete a project to redistribute its own frequency bands from 3G to 4G. On 13 December 2024, Beeline abandoned the 3G frequency range in Saint Petersburg and the Leningrad Oblast.

=== Kazakhstan ===
In 2004, PJSC VimpelCom, in its first move outside Russia's territory, acquired Kazakhstani cellular operator KaR-Tel (brand names K-Mobile and Excess).

=== Kyrgyzstan ===
Beeline is active in Kyrgyzstan and it is one of the most popular cellular carriers in the country. The first call on GSM network of Kyrgyzstan was made on 1 August 1998. In 2001, the trade name MobiCard was established that turned into the brand Mobi in 2007. In 2009, the company started to provide services under international brand Beeline. As of 2022, the company provides services in standards of GSM-900/1800 and WCDMA/UMTS 2100/900 (3G) and LTE 800/1800/2100/2600 (4G).

=== Uzbekistan ===
Beeline operates in Uzbekistan as a wholly owned subsidiary of VEON and serves approximately 7.7 million mobile customers.

== Former markets ==
=== Armenia ===
On 16 November 2006, PJSC VimpelCom acquired the 90% share of Armentel CJSC (renamed to VEON Armenia in 2017), held by the Hellenic Telecommunications Organization SA (OTE) for €341.9 million.

In 2020, Team CJSC, founded by Armenian businessmen Hayk and Alexander Yesayan, acquired 100% of the shares of "VEON Armenia" and started offering services under the name "Team".

=== Australia ===
In November 2018, it was observed that Beeline owned a range of 1000 numbers with the +61 country code, from +61497906000 to +61497906999. Numbers in this range have been used for a technical support scam, posing as a Windows Help Desk in cold calls to Australian and New Zealand numbers.

=== Georgia ===
The first mobile call with VEON Georgia (brand Beeline) was initiated on 15 March 2007. From this time onward, the company has been actively developing and as of today, it provides 1.3 million customers with 2G GSM 900/1800 MHz, 3G 2100 MHz, 4G 800/1800 MHz and 5G wireless services under the name "Cellfie". Beeline's Georgia division was later bought out by a Georgian businessman (Khvicha Makatsaria) and is no longer owned by Vimpelcom or VEON, being later rebranded to "Celfie". Its current website address is Celfie.ge - and going to Beeline.ge will also redirect you to Celfie's website.

=== Laos ===
In 2011, Beeline entered Laos as VimpelCom Lao, replacing former Tigo. 22% shareholding remains with the Lao government. 3G HSPA+ services began in January 2012. Numbers on Beeline Laos were 020-7xxx-xxxx.

=== Ukraine ===
Beeline Ukraine (known as Ukrainian RadioSystems (URS) before February 2007) was a mobile operator in Ukraine with 2.22 million GSM subscribers (February 2007). In 2010, Beeline merged with Kyivstar. As a result, all Beeline subscribers were moved to Kyivstar.

The company was founded in 1995, and Motorola acquired 49% of the company in 1996. URS obtained a GSM-900 license in 1997, but Motorola backed off the venture the same year due to an alleged government favoritism to another mobile operator. The Korean Daewoo acquired ownership, although it failed to grow the business, and eventually sold it to a Ukrainian financial group in 2003. In November 2005, 100% of the company's ownership was acquired by the Russian VimpelCom for $230 million. The deal was surrounded by a controversy involving two major shareholders of VimpelCom: the Russian Alfa Group and Telenor, a Norwegian telecom conglomerate.

Following the acquisition by VimpelCom, all of the company's services have been rebranded as Beeline, similar to a VimpelCom's major mobile assets in Russia. In 2010 Beeline Ukraine (URS) was merged with Kyivstar. Now the company operates only under Kyivstar brand.

=== Vietnam ===
In July 2009, VimpelCom cooperated with a Vietnamese telecommunication company, GTel Telecommunications, to open a new mobile phone network in Vietnam called Beeline Vietnam. However, in 2012, after three years of business losses, Beeline withdrew from the joint venture and the Vietnamese market in general. Gtel Mobile continues to exploit the remaining base in Vietnam with a new brand, Gmobile.

== See also ==
- List of mobile network operators in Europe
