= Dmitry Zimin =

Russian businessman (1933–2021)

- Дмитрий Зимин
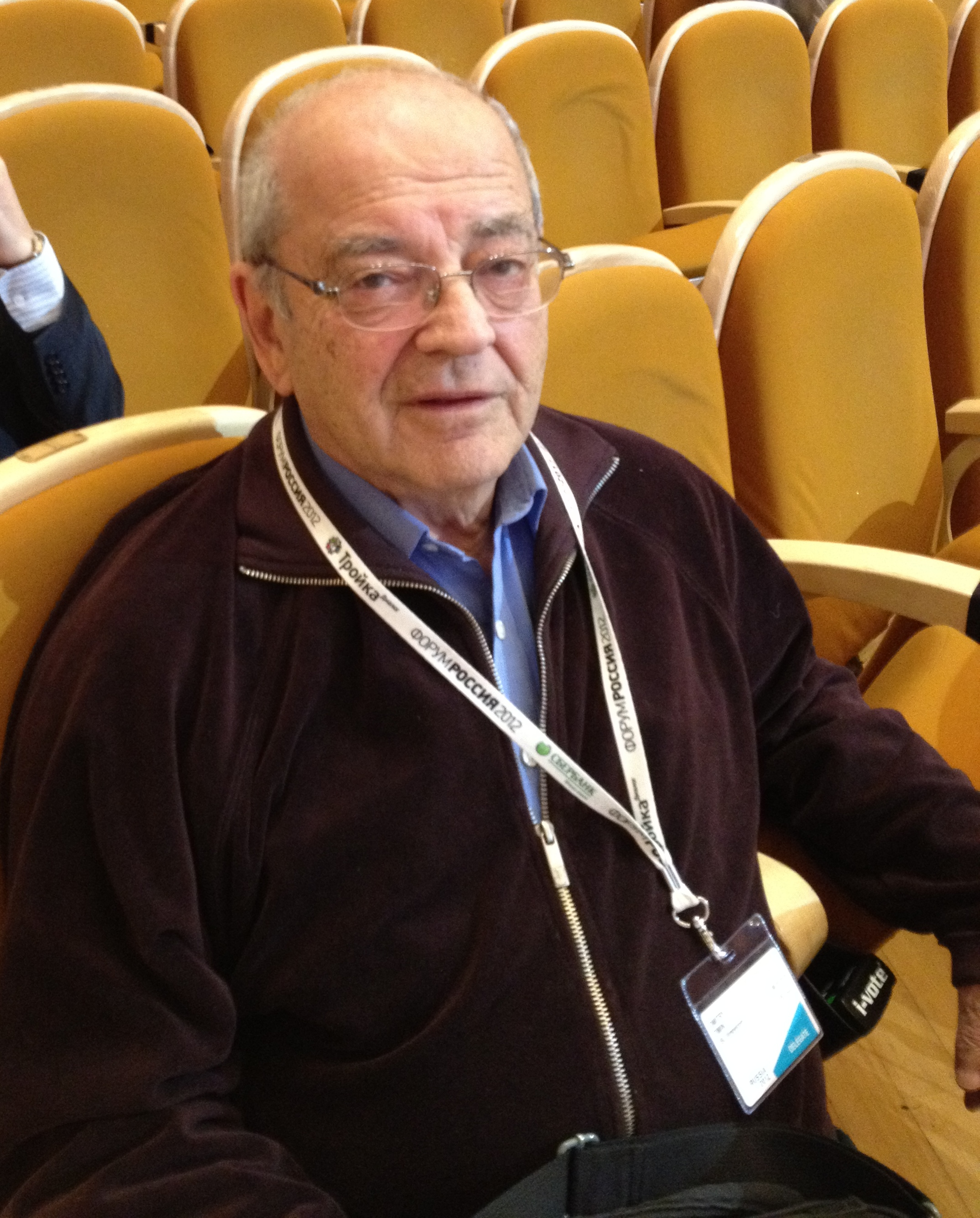
- Zimin at The Russia Forum in 2012
- Born: Dmitry Borisovich Zimin; 28 April 1933; Moscow, Russian SFSR, Soviet Union
- Died: 22 December 2021 (aged 88); Switzerland
- Citizenship: Russian
- Education: Moscow Aviation Institute (MAI)
- Occupations: Scientist; businessman; philanthropist

Dmitry Borisovich Zimin (Russian: Дмитрий Борисович Зимин; 28 April 1933 – 22 December 2021) was a Russian radio scientist and businessman, who was the founder and honorary president of VimpelCom. From his retirement in the early 2000s, he became known as a philanthropist. He founded the Dynasty Foundation and the Zimin Foundation.

== Early life and education ==
Dmitry Zimin was already engaged in radio engineering when he was a student at Moscow secondary school number 59. In 1950, he entered the Faculty of Radio Electronics of the Aircraft of the Moscow Aviation Institute (MAI), from which he graduated in 1957. Then he secured the position of an engineer in the Problem Laboratory of MAI, led by Mikhail Neumann.

== Career in science and technology ==
In 1962, Zimin was invited to work in the Radio Technical Institute of the Academy of Sciences of the USSR. For more than thirty-five years he held managerial positions at this institute: he was the head of the laboratory, then for fourteen years the head of the scientific department, and then the director of the center for the development of radio equipment.

Zimin obtained his PhD degree in 1963 and the post-doctoral degree in 1984. As a researcher of phased antenna arrays, he was appointed deputy chief designer of the Don-2N radar. In total, he created more than 100 scientific works and inventions. In 1965 together with other scientists (including the engineer A.A. Doljenkov) he became a laureate of the A. S. Popov Prize of the Academy of Sciences of the USSR.

== Business activity ==
In the final years of the USSR, there was a sharp reduction in defense contracts for the Radio Technical Institute. In March 1991, Zimin founded a private commercial enterprise "KB Impulse". It hired the technical experts who worked at the Institute and specialized in communication systems.

In 1991, Zimin organized a group of technical experts within the Radio Technical Institute for a project to develop cellular telephone communications. At the initial stage, an American cellular equipment manufacturer and operator owned by the Fabela family was invited as a partner. In 1992, the joint-stock company "Vimpel-Communications" (VimpelCom) was established, with Zimin as President and General Director. Zimin managed the operational activity of the company, while his partner Augie K Fabela II contributed equipment and money and managed sales and marketing. Soon VimpelCom launched a pilot AMPS station in Moscow.

The company became successful and in 1996, it became the first Russian company to be listed on the New York Stock Exchange, which required a degree of transparency uncommon for Russian companies at the time.

In 2001, at the age of 68, Dmitry Zimin sold his controlling stake in VimpelCom and left the position of general director of the company. He was honored with the title of the Founder and Honorary President of the company.

After selling VimpelCom, Zimin invested in various enterprises. In 2019, BMT Private Equity, founded by Zimin, bought the Russian carsharing company BelkaCar.

== Foundations for philanthropic activities ==
Following his retirement, Zimin devoted much of his time and wealth to philanthropic activities, mainly facilitated through his Dynasty Foundation in Russia. The Dynasty Foundation was managed by an independent board, in which the Zimin family was represented by Dr. Zimin and his son Boris Zimin.

The foundation's priorities were the development of fundamental scientific research and education in Russia, creating conditions so that scientists could research and teach at home in Russia, and the popularization of science and civic education. The foundation was the first private Russian nonprofit foundation supporting science and education in modern Russia. It ran projects for the support and popularization of science and the development of formal and civic education. These included programs that supported gifted schoolchildren, future scientists, young physicists, mathematicians, biologists, and teachers.

In 2015, when the Dynasty Foundation was included by the Russian Ministry of Justice on the list of “foreign agents”, Zimin closed the foundation. A number of scientists and public figures condemned the position of the Ministry of Justice regarding the fund, considering the decision to be bureaucratic and unfair.

Zimin continued his philanthropic activities through the Zimin Foundation. In Russia, it supports the Enlightener Prize, the Independent University of Moscow, and other projects. International projects were also supported by the Zimin Foundation in public health care, science, education, and culture, including Ariel University and the School of Molecular and Theoretical Biology, Tel-Aviv University in Israel, and others.

== Awards ==
- 2001: the “Business-Olympus” prize in the nomination “Business Reputation”. The Russian edition of Forbes magazine rated Dmitry Zimin as the 63rd richest person in Russia in 2004 and the 52nd in 2005.
- 2008: "Symbol of Science" medal in the nomination "Entrepreneur" for 2007 - for specific symbolic steps that bring closer the creation of a legal and moral environment in society in which fair competition of human talents is possible."Названы лауреаты медали «Символ науки» за 2007 год" (in Russian). 13 February 2008. Archived from the original on 8 June 2015.
- 2012: Gratitude of the President of the Russian Federation - for active charitable and social activities
- 2013: the Carnegie Medal of Philanthropy in 2013, the first Russian philanthropist to win the award.
- 2013: as a gift for the 80th anniversary of Dmitry Zimin, the minor planet 315493 Zimin was named after Dmitry Zimin.
- 2015: the "For Fidelity to Science" award from the Russian Federation's Ministry of Education and Science.

== Personal life and death ==
Zimin died in Switzerland on 22 December 2021, at the age of 88, through an euthanasia procedure. He had one son, Boris Zimin.
