= Cityline (ISP) =

Russian internet service provider

- Type: Private
- Industry: Telecommunications
- Headquarters: Russia, Moscow
- Key people: Emelyan Zakharov, Demyan Kudryavcev, Egor Shuppe, Dmitry Bosov, Rafael Filinov
- Parent: Golden Telecom (since 2001)

Founded in December 1996, Cityline, a specialist provider of Internet technology (ISP), was one of the first major Internet providers in Moscow and across Russia. The founders of this limited company comprise a list of leading Russian businessmen:

- Emelyan Zakharov, the renowned Moscow art dealer
- Demyan Kudryavcev, chief executive of the major publishing house Commersant
- Georgy Shuppe, the former president of Cityline.
- Dmitry Bosov; owner of the large investment company Alltech
- Rafael Filinov; currently Chairman of the privately held corporation Djeruialtin.

The line-up is completed by a major European investment company.
Cityline provided its services to such blue chip names as Mercedes, Vist, Soyuz and Computer Land.
In 1997 Cityline, in association with Mr. Sergey Skatershikov, founded Netskate, the company that owned a dozen of the most popular websites from the early period of Runet, one of which was the leading Russian ‘Web Design’ studio of Artemy Lebedev.
Cityline was one of the first companies in Russia to enter into a cooperation agreement with Microsoft as an official Internet-provider for Windows 98 and its Small Business Server packages.
By 2001 Cityline had 100 000 subscribers and was bought out for $29 million by the international telecommunications company Golden Telecom that had been founded by the global corporation Global Telesystems.
