= Zimin Foundation =

Nonprofit philanthropic organization

- Founded: 2015
- Founder: Dmitry Zimin, Boris Zimin
- Type: Non-Profit Foundation
- Leader: Boris Zimin
- Website: www.ziminfoundation.org

Zimin Foundation is a philanthropic nonprofit organization established by Dr Dmitry Zimin and his son Boris Zimin with the aim of supporting science, education and spread of information.

== History ==
In 2002 Dmitry Zimin started Dynasty Foundation, an organization focusing mainly on Russia. The foundation became the first private Russian nonprofit supporting science and education in the country through programs for gifted schoolchildren and university students, young physicists, mathematicians, biologists, and teachers.

In 2015, the Russian Ministry of Justice put Dynasty Foundation on the list of foreign agents, effectively forcing it to wrap up its activities. Since then the Zimin family has continued its philanthropic effort through the Zimin Foundation. No longer limited to Russia, the organization's activities have extended to other countries.

After Zimin's death on December 22, 2021, his son Boris Zimin took over as the leader of Zimin Foundation's charitable efforts.

On 5 August 2025, the foundation was declared an "undesirable organization" by the Russian Prosecutor General's Office, accusing it of "financial and informational support to extremists, terrorists and foreign agents" and "intensifying anti-Russian rhetoric" since the Russian invasion of Ukraine.

== Main projects ==
=== Zimin Institutes ===
Zimin Institutes are a Zimin Foundation initiative pursued in partnership with universities worldwide. It was designed to identify and support applied research projects that are likely to translate into real-world live-improving technologies.

The Zimin Institute for Engineering Solutions Advancing Better Lives at Tel Aviv University was launched in 2018.

The Zimin Institute for Smart and Sustainable Cities opened in 2020 at Arizona State University in the United States.

In June 2022 Israel Institute of Technology and the Zimin Foundation established the Zimin Institute for AI Solutions in Healthcare at the Technion.

Each institute specializes in a different area while maintaining research collaboration to develop applied technological projects with real-world implications.

=== The Enlightener Award ===
The Enlightener Award (Prosvetitel in Russian) was established in 2008 by Dr. Dmitry Zimin and is awarded annually to the best non-fiction book written in the Russian language. Its purpose is to motivate Russian-speaking scientists and science journalists writing about the latest discoveries and research. The Enlightener Award – independent, stand-alone project that is not supported by the Zimin Foundation.

=== School of Molecular and Theoretical Biology ===
School of Molecular and Theoretical Biology (SMTB) organized in 2012 with support from the Dynasty Foundation is independent project that connects motivated high-school students to operating biological labs, where they can participate in real scientific experiments. At SMTB students listen to lectures, learn research techniques and calculations and explore current ideas in molecular and theoretical biology.

== Other projects ==
The Foundation also provides support in the areas of education and free access to information.

=== Education ===
Together with Boris Nemtzov Foundation (named after Boris Nemtsov), the Zimin Foundation offers scholarships for students in Prague University of Economics and Business, Charles University, Ruhr University Bochum, and Academy of Arts, Architecture and Design in Prague. Eight Russian students affected by war got ZF scholarships at Hunter College (NY, USA).

After February 2022, the focus is on providing scholarships and other types of educational support for Ukrainian refugees. The Zimin Foundation sponsors the Center for Development and Assistance in Wroclaw, a school for more than 200 Ukrainian refugee children.

The Foundation sponsors scholarships to educational institutions throughout the world, such as Le Sallay Academy (France), a school of innovative blended learning.

=== Free access to information ===
Redkollegia is an independent award established in 2016 by Boris Zimin to support free professional journalism in Russia. Despite war, censorship, and funding cuts, independent Russian reporters keep producing quality journalism. The Redkollegia award recognizes their work and aims to become a hub for financial support for independent media.

The Zimin Foundation works with:

- Re:Russia - an expertise and discussion platform aiming to address key issues of Russian politics, economy and society, and Dissernet, a volunteer community network working to clear the Russian science of plagiarism and other falsifications.

- The Sakharov Center is a multifunctional educational space dedicated to Nobel Prize laureate Dr. Andrei Sakharov. On January 24, 2023, its headquarters in Moscow were closed under the Russian foreign agent law.

- Memorial is an international historical, educational, charitable, and human rights society. Memorial's operations in Moscow were terminated on December 29, 2021 by the Moscow City Court for allegedly violating the "foreign agent" law.
