= Dynasty Foundation =

Russian science foundation, 2002–2015

- Фонд «Династия»
- Formation: 2002
- Founder: Dmitry Zimin
- Dissolved: 2015
- Type: Non-Profit Foundation
- Purpose: Development of fundamental scientific research and education in Russia; popularization of science and civic education
- Budget: 435 million rubles (2015)
- Website: web.archive.org/web/20190725163324/http://www.dynastyfdn.com/english/

Dynasty Foundation was Russia's only private funder of scientific research. It was created by VympelCom founder Dmitry Zimin in 2002. After the Russian Ministry of Justice added Dynasty to its list of foreign agents in 2015 due to Zimin's own contributions coming from his foreign bank account, the Foundation decided to shut down.

== History ==
Dynasty Foundation was founded in 2002 by telecommunications businessman and philanthropist Dmitry Zimin.

The priority areas of the Foundation's activities were the development of fundamental science and education in Russia, the creation of conditions for the work of scientists in their homeland, the popularization of science and education.

Dynasty has supported the research of young biologists, physicists, and mathematicians; science programs for high-school students in academic institutions; and training for science teachers, among other programs. Dynasty also funded the translation of popular science literature, founded a book award for these writers, and supported lectures and festivals that promoted scientific knowledge.

The first program of the foundation was launched in 2002 - grants and scholarships for students and young physicists.

In 2007, for the first time in Russian history, the foundation was turned over to a board of trustees appointed from members of the public.

In 2012 at the initiative of the Dynasty Foundation, the first School of Molecular and Theoretical Biology for high school students was held on the basis of the laboratories of Pushchino Scientific Center for Biological Research (PSCBI) of the Russian Academy of Sciences.

In 2013, Dmitry Zimin was awarded the Andrew Carnegie Medal of Philanthropy, becoming the first Russian philanthropist to receive it.

In 2015, Zimin was awarded a national prize "For Faithfulness to Science" in the category "For Patronage of Science" for significant contribution in popularizing science and supporting the scientific community.

Dynasty Foundation was designated a "foreign agent" in 2015. The cause given was Dynasty's support for the organization Liberal Mission, which held lectures on modern politics in 2014, and founder Zimin's contributions to the fund coming from his foreign bank account. Rather than carry the label, the board decided to liquidate the Foundation.

The registration of Dynasty sparked protests from Russia's Presidential Human Rights Council, which called upon the Plenum of the Supreme Court to examine the practice of the courts in the application of the law.

In 2016, D. Zimin, together with his son Boris, founded the international non-profit organization "Zimin Foundation", which provides support for education and science in different countries of the world.
