= Uklon =

Ukrainian vehicle for hire, freight, food delivery and parcel delivery company

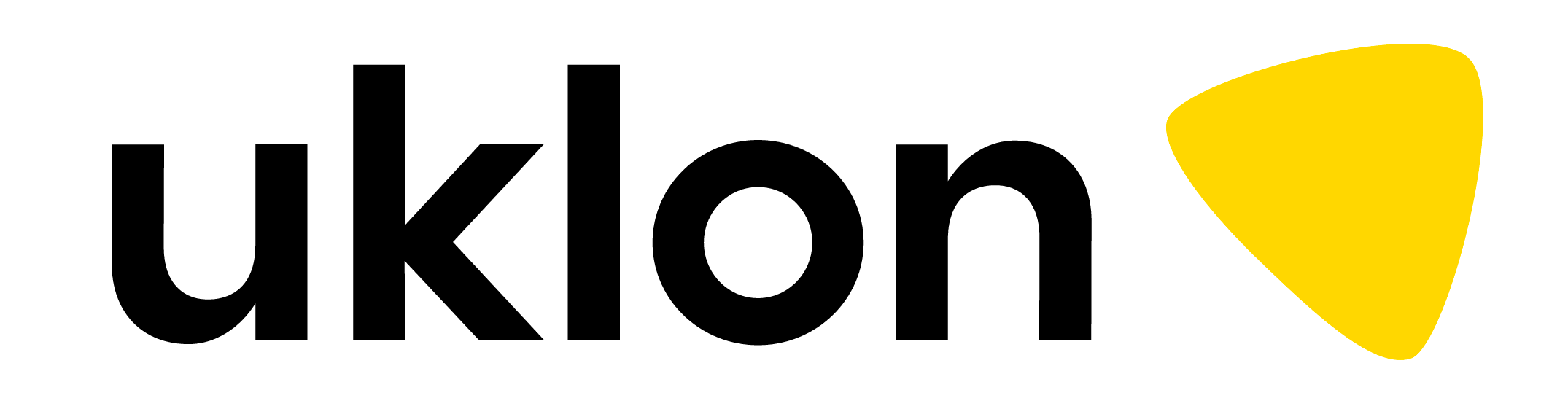

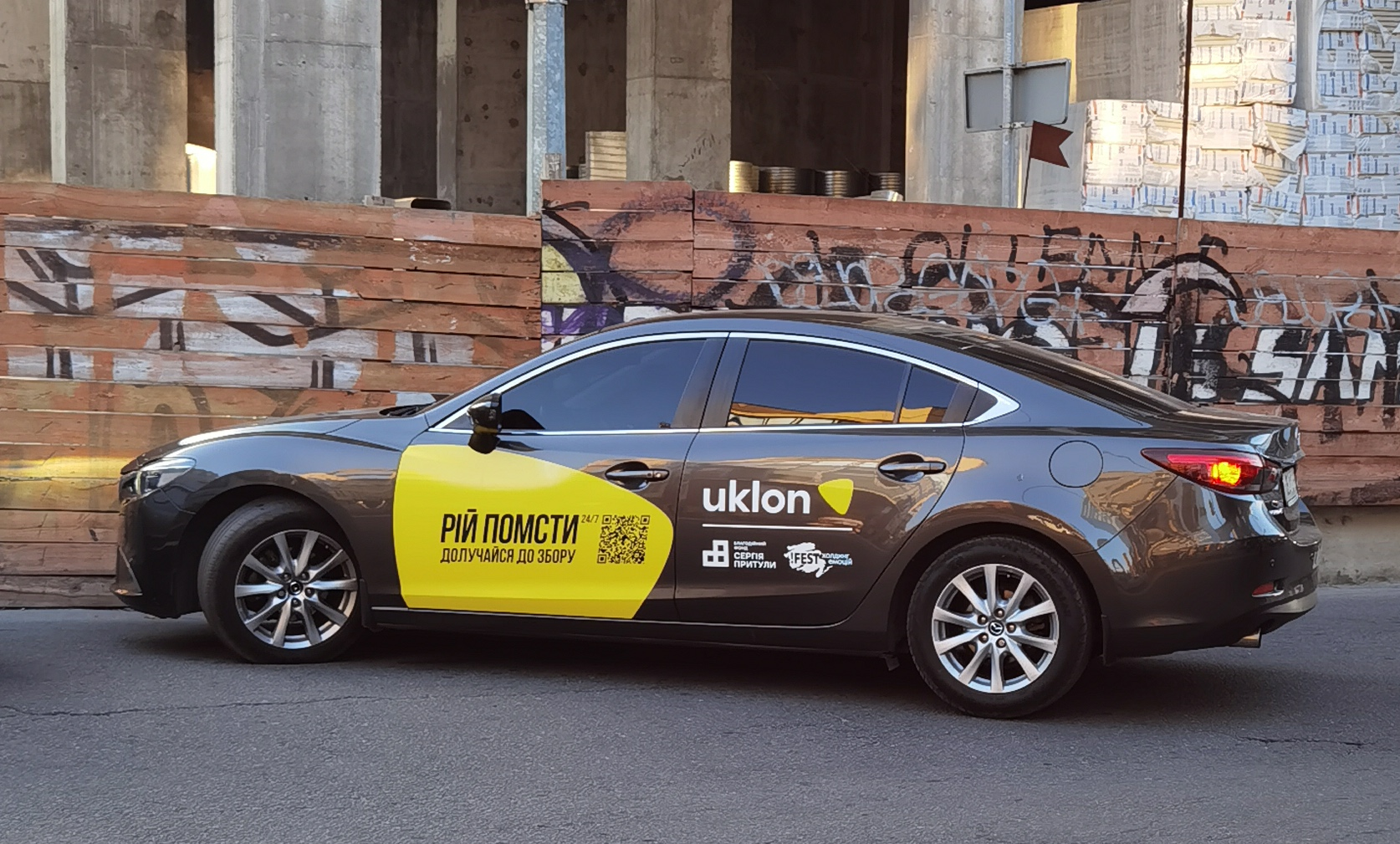
- A Uklon Taxi in Dnipro, Ukraine
- Industry: Information technology
- Founded: March 25, 2010; 16 years ago
- Founders: Serhii Smus, Vitaliy Dyatlenko, Dmytro Dubrovskyi, Victoria Dubrovska
- Headquarters: Kyiv, Ukraine
- Area served: Ukraine; Uzbekistan
- Products: Uklon Rider App, Uklon Driver App
- Number of employees: 509 (2022)
- Website: uklon.com.ua/en/

Uklon is a Ukrainian ride-hailing service. Uklon offers ride-hailing, delivery service, carpooling, and other transportation services.

Uklon covers 28 cities in Ukraine, as well as Tashkent, Uzbekistan. The service has been suspended in two of them, Kherson and Mariupol, since the 2022 Russian invasion of Ukraine.

In 2024, Ekonomichna Pravda accused Uklon of tax avoidance.

In 2025, Uklon was acquired by Kyivstar for US$155 million.
