= The Russia Forum =

Former annual event in Moscow, Russia

- Frequency: Annually
- Locations: Moscow, Russian Federation
- Inaugurated: 2008
- Most recent: 2013
- Participants: over 2000 top-level business executives
- Organizer: Sberbank, Sberbank CIB
- Website: The Russia Forum

The Russia Forum was an annual event held in Moscow and hosted by Troika Dialog from 2008 to 2013. From 2012, the forum was jointly organized by Sberbank of Russia and Troika Dialog.

The event was sometimes referred to as the "Russian Davos", in reference to the World Economic Forum held in Davos, Switzerland. The comparison reflected both the timing of the two events, with The Russia Forum taking place shortly after the World Economic Forum's annual meeting, and the forum's high-profile speakers, industry-focused agenda, and discussions involving business and political leaders.

The Russia Forum was one of the key economic events of the year, attracting an audience of key global investors, globally renowned economists, executives and leaders from global companies, along with Russian and foreign political leaders and for discussions around social, economic, political and financial issues faced by Russian, the CIS region and the broader world economy.

From 2008 to 2013, participants of The Russia Forum gathered annually in Moscow to exchange opinions through a format of open debate and continuous dialogue to hear different viewpoints on issues regarding global growth. They were able to communicate directly with leading politicians, executives of top Russian and global companies, leading scholars, international investors, cultural-societal figureheads and influential members of the media from around the world. In addition to the large number of panel sessions and conferences, one-on-one investor meetings were also held as part of the format and unparalleled networking opportunities of The Russia Forum.

== The Russia Forum 2013 ==
The Russia Forum 2013 was held at the World Trade Center in Moscow from April 16–19. The event was hosted by Sberbank and Sberbank CIB. The plenary sessions of the Forum touched on subjects including relevant economic and political issues and the prospects for, and challenges facing particular sectors of the economy. Among the discussion sessions were: Turning point: Communism was Russia's answer to the challenges of the 20th century. What can we expect in the 21st century?; Tapping the Potential of Siberia and Russia's Far East; How Can the Valuation Gap of Russian Companies Be Overcome?; Finance and Telecoms: Two Sectors Converging.

Scheduled to speak at the Forum in 2013 were academics Charles Wyplosz and Richard Pipes, former president of the Czech Republic Vaclav Klaus, investors Mark Mobius and David Bonderman, head of Federal Service for Financial Markets Dmitry Pankin and business leaders and heads of companies:

- Margarita Louis-Dreyfus (Chairperson of Louis Dreyfus Holding),
- Oleg Deripaska (CEO of RUSAL),
- Mikhail Kusnirovich (founder of Bosco di Ciliegi),
- Ilya Yakubson (President of Dixy Group),
- Andrei Dubovskov (President, MTS),
- Ivan Tavrin (CEO of MegaFon),
- Maxim Nogotkov (President of Svyaznoy Group),
- Mikhail Shamolin (CEO of Sistema),
- Maelle Gavet (CEO of Ozon Holdings),
- Jane Zavalishina (CEO of Yandex.Money),
- Sureyya Ciliv (CEO of Turkcell),
- Abraham Foss (senior vice president of Telenor Group), among others.

== The Russia Forum 2012 ==
The 2012 edition of The Russia Forum was held in Moscow from January 30-February 4. Around 4,500 people attended the event which featured more than 40 panel discussions and sessions devoted to a range of topics — from global economic challenges to investment in art and the prospects of Russia's contemporary film industry. A special day was added to the Forum which was devoted to investment possibilities in the film industry, television and new media. One of the panel sessions during the main part of the Forum featured a speech by then-Prime Minister Vladimir Putin which was followed up by a discussion involving Putin and economists Paul Krugman, Raghuram Rajan, and Michael Milken. The Forum was covered by 345 journalists representing 113 Russian and foreign media outlets. The event also was covered by twenty television stations. Other speakers at the Forum included Igor Shuvalov, Sergey Sobyanin, Gordon Brown, Alexey Kudrin, Nouriel Roubini, Kenneth Rogoff and other political and economic figures as well as businesspeople.

== The Russia Forum 2011 ==
The Russia Forum 2011, was held in Moscow on 2–4 February 2011, which saw business leaders, investors, government officials and influential thinkers from around the world converge to exchange ideas in an environment of open discussion and vigorous debate.

The Russia Forum 2011 was attended by a diverse and distinguished audience of over 2,000 delegates representing over 50 countries, including 1,796 delegates and 123 speakers. Detailed on-site coverage throughout the Forum was provided by the event's 15 media partners as well as over 360 journalists representing 102 media outlets from around the world, including 20 TV channels. The dedicated The Russia Forum website was the ‘go-to’ destination for all Forum news before, during and after the event, with 39,730 visitors and 148,698 unique hits. On February 3 and 4, more than 1900 meetings were organised for representatives of 80 companies and 134 investment funds. Key speakers at the Forum included:

- Arkady Dvorkovich, aide to the President of the Russian Federation
- Alexei Kudrin, deputy prime minister, Minister of Finance of the Russian Federation
- Sergei Sobyanin, mayor of Moscow
- Ruben Vardanian, chairman of the board of directors, CEO, Troika Dialog
- Noubar Afeyan, managing partner and CEO, FlagShip Ventures
- Ruben Aganbegyan, president, MICEX Group
- Oleg Bakhmatyuk, chairman of the board of directors, Agroholding Avangard
- Artem Volynets, CEO, En+Group
- Oleg Vyugin, chairman of the board of directors, MDM Bank
- Sergei Galitsky, CEO, Magnit
- Sunil Godhwani, chairman, managing director, Religare Enterprises Limited
- Herman Gref, chairman of the board, CEO, Sberbank
- Alexander Izosimov, president and chief executive officer, VimpelCom Ltd
- Boris Jordan, president, chairman of the board of directors, Renaissance Insurance Group
- Mikhail Kusnirovich, president and CEO, Bosco di Ciliegi
- Shachindra Nath, Group CEO, Religare Enterprises Ltd
- Fatih Birol, chief economist, International Energy Agency
- Zeljko Bogetic, lead economist for Russia, The World Bank
- Michael Milken, chairman, Milken Institute
- Nouriel Roubini, professor of economics, NYU's Stern School of Business
- Joseph Stiglitz, professor, Columbia University
- Lawrence H. Summers, Charles W. Eliot University Professor, Harvard Kennedy School
- Nassim Taleb, distinguished professor, New York University Polytechnic Institute
- Sergey Brilev, deputy director and anchor, TV Channel "Rossiya" (RTR)
- Stephen Sackur, journalist, BBC

== History ==
=== The Russia Forum 2010 ===
Held from February 3 to 5 in Moscow, The Russia Forum 2010 was attended by some two thousand participants and delegates from 63 different countries. Twenty-five panel discussions and Forum sessions were devoted to issues relevant to the post-crisis world and the opportunities being created under the new economic paradigm where emerging markets were the early leaders in the recovery. The Forum also served as a platform for one-on-one meetings between companies. More than 350 representatives of foreign and Russian media covered the event. Speakers at the Forum included:

- Alexei Kudrin, deputy prime minister, Minister of Finance of the Russian Federation
- Igor Shuvalov, first deputy prime minister of the Russian Federation
- Alexander Abramov, chairman of the board of directors, Evraz Group
- Fyodor Andreyev, president, ALROSA
- Ronald Arculli, chairman, Hong Kong Exchanges
- Ruben Vardanian, chairman of the board of directors, CEO, Troika Dialog
- Oleg Vyugin, chairman of the board of directors, MDM Bank
- Gustavo Fabien Grobocopatel, president, Los Grobo Group
- Jacko Maree, CEO, Standard Bank Group
- Xavier Rolet, CEO, London Stock Exchange
- Pavel Strunilin, energy vice president, TNK-BP
- Lev Khasis, CEO, X5 Retail Group
- Sergei Shvetsov, board of directors member, Central Bank of Russia
- Anatoly Chubais, CEO, RUSNANO
- Nouriel Roubini, professor of economics, NYU's Stern School of Business
- Hernando De Soto, president, Institute for Liberty and Democracy
- Nassim Taleb, distinguished professor, New York University Polytechnic Institute
- Marc Faber, editor and publisher, “The Gloom, Boom & Doom Report”
- Howard Davies, director, London School of Economics and Political Science
- Hugh Hendry, CEO and founding partner of Eclectica Asset Management (now closed)

=== The Russia Forum 2008 and 2009 ===
Participants in the 2008 and 2009 Forums totalled more than 3000 delegates: heads of state and governments, officials, ambassadors, leaders of international organisations and the world's largest companies. Discussions centred upon issues in the world economy, overcoming the financial crisis, building a new financial system and Russia's role in these processes. Participants included the following:

- Arkady Dvorkovich, aide to the president of the Russian Federation
- Yuri Molchanov, vice governor of St. Petersburg
- Rustam Minnikhanov, prime minister, Republic of Tatarstan
- Andrey Fursenko, Minister of Education and Science of the Russian Federation
- Igor Shuvalov, first deputy prime minister of the Russian Federation
- Richard Branson, chairman and founder, Virgin Group
- Ruben Vardanian, chairman of the board of directors, CEO, Troika Dialog
- Herman Gref, chairman of the board, CEO, Sberbank
- Carlos Ghosn, president—general director, Renault and Nissan
- Sergey Kravchenko, president, Boeing Russia/CIS
- Boris Aleshin, president, AVTOVAZ
- Erik Berglof, chief economist, EBRD
- Sir Anthony Brenton, former British ambassador to Russia, UK Foreign Office
- Paul Wolfowitz, ambassador, former president of the World Bank and U.S. Deputy Minister of Defense
- Alan Greenspan, chairman of the U.S. Federal Reserve (1987—2006)
- Nouriel Roubini, professor of economics, NYU Stern School of Business
- Nassim Taleb, distinguished professor, New York University Polytechnic Institute
- José María Figueres, president of Costa Rica (1994–1998)
- Vladimir Pozner, president, Academy of Russian Television
