= Kyivstar =

Ukrainian mobile operator

Kyivstar JSC

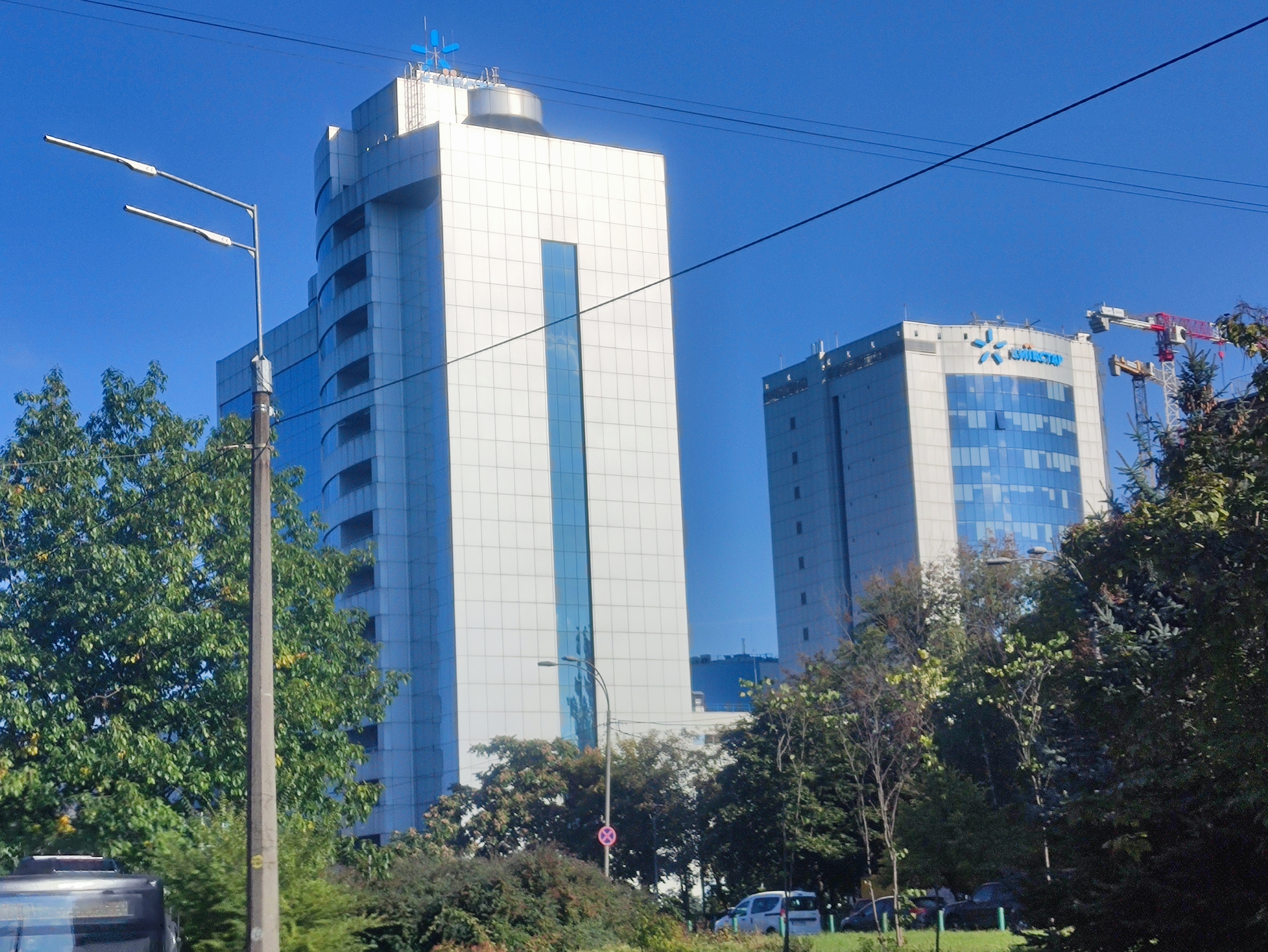
- Headquarters of Kyivstar
- Type: Joint-stock company
- Traded as: Nasdaq: KYIV
- Industry: Mobile Telecommunications
- Founded: 1994
- Headquarters: Kyiv, Ukraine
- Key people: Oleksandr Komarov — President; Andrew Simmons — CFO
- Products: Cellular (2G:GSM, 3G:UMTS, 4G:LTE), Internet access (FTTB)
- Revenue: $ 1.157 billion (2025)
- Operating income: 13,010,193,000 hryvnia (2020)
- Net income: $ 124 million (2025)
- Total assets: 24,463,716,000 hryvnia (2020)
- Number of employees: ~4,000 (2017)
- Parent: VEON
- Subsidiaries: Helsi, Uklon
- Website: kyivstar.ua

Kyivstar (Ukrainian: Київстар) is a Ukrainian telecommunications operator offering fixed and mobile voice and data services, including 4G LTE, throughout Ukraine. The Kyivstar mobile network covers all cities of Ukraine, as well as more than 28,000 rural settlements, all major national and regional routes, most sea, and river coasts. As of 2024, Kyivstar served approximately 24 million mobile subscribers and over 1 million fixed-broadband (‘Home Internet’) customers. In 2024, Kyivstar partnered with Starlink to offer satellite-based messaging and broadband in Ukraine. In August 2025, Kyivstar became the first U.S.-listed Ukrainian company.

== History ==
PJSC Kyivstar was registered in Ukraine in 1994 and commenced mobile‐telephony operations in 1997. The company's head office is located in Kyiv. Kyivstar is a part of the international telecom group VEON. Oleksandr Komarov has been the President of the company since December 2018.

In 2022, Kyivstar, together with other mobile operators, the Ministry of Digital Transformation of Ukraine, the State Service for Special Communications and Information Protection of Ukraine, the National Commission for State Regulation in the Fields of Electronic Communications, Radio Frequency Spectrum and Postal Services, together with the Ukrainian Association of Telecom Operators "Telas", launched national roaming.

In December 2024, Kyivstar announced that it had signed an agreement with Elon Musk’s Starlink to introduce direct-to-cell satellite connectivity for its subscribers in Ukraine. Subsequently, in July 2025 Kyivstar confirmed that the partnership with Starlink’s LEO satellite constellation would enable over-the-top messaging by the end of 2025, with mobile satellite broadband and voice services to follow in mid-2026. The service makes Ukraine one of the first countries to have the Starlink direct-to-cell service.

Since 2025, the company has expanded into digital health, ride-hailing, delivery, and cloud-computing services. Its subsidiaries include Helsi, Ukraine’s digital health platform, Uklon, Ukraine’s ride-hailing and delivery platform, and its big data and cloud services, supporting 500 business clients.

On March 18, 2025, Kyivstar signed a business combination agreement with Cohen Circle Acquisition Corp (CCIR). On August 15, 2025, Kyivstar started trading on the NASDAQ Stock Exchange in the United States as the first U.S.-listed Ukrainian company. It is trading under the ticker symbol KYIV, replacing CCIR. Its parent company, VEON, retained and locked up nearly 87% of its shares, leaving less than 11% available for public shareholders.

In November 2025, Kyivstar officially launched Europe's first direct-to-cell service, bringing the service to market in Ukraine in partnership with Starlink.

== During the Russian invasion of Ukraine ==
Since Russia’s full-scale invasion on 24 February 2022, Kyivstar implemented a series of measures to support its customers and the Ukrainian public.

During February and March 2022, in cooperation with the State Emergency Service of Ukraine, Kyivstar sent over 150 million SMS alerts detailing air-raid procedures and basic first-aid instructions. In the first quarter of 2022, Kyivstar invested UAH 659 million in communication development. The company built hundreds of new mobile communication facilities and connected 1,150 bomb shelters in various cities of Ukraine to free Internet. Thanks to the round-the-clock work of the company's specialists, 95% of the base stations of the telecom network operated normally. Kyivstar provided emergency credit and free communication services to customers, including refugees in neighboring countries. It extended business-client payment deadlines and offered some services for free.

=== Charity and fundraising ===
Kyivstar allocated at least UAH 15 million for charity and paid more than UAH 1 billion in taxes ahead of schedule. It donated ₴10 million to the Come Back Alive charity fund and 5 million for the NGO “Your Support” (Твоя опора, Tvoya opora). It also built a platform to raise funds for Armed Forces of Ukraine. With the short number 88009, Kyivstar subscribers collected more than UAH 1.2 million in the first two weeks of the platform's existence.

== Use of artificial intelligence ==
On 17 June 2025, Kyivstar and Ministry of Digital Transformation of Ukraine signed a memorandum to develop the country’s first Ukrainian-language large language model (LLM), due for release in December 2025. The parties plan to develop Ukrainian LLM using open-source architectures and trained exclusively on Ukrainian data sources. In addition to capturing the full range of Ukrainian dialects, terminology, history, and cultural context, the project is designed to ensure that sensitive national data is securely stored and processed within Ukraine, for sectors such as government, defense, healthcare, and financial services.

== Network ==
The company uses six network codes: 67, 68, 77, 96, 97 and 98.

On December 12, 2023, Kyivstar experienced a significant service outage, which its CEO, Oleksandr Komarov, attributed to a powerful Russian cyber attack. This attack, described as one of the largest against a civilian communications system, disrupted both phone and internet access for millions in Ukraine and involved efforts to destroy the company's virtual infrastructure. The company restored services and continued operation.

== Awards and recognition ==
In 2016, Deloitte named Kyivstar among the 500 largest companies in Central and Eastern Europe, one of 29 Ukrainian firms on the list.

In 2020, Korrespondent magazine ranked Kyivstar as the most valuable brand in Ukraine, estimating its value at US $225.48 million. In the same year, the annual TOP-100 ratings published by Delo.ua and TOP-100 recognized Kyivstar as the Best Employer in Ukraine, and the company was also named Company of the Year in the mobile communications sector.

According to independent reports, Kyivstar was the largest taxpayer in Ukraine among communications and information companies for both 2020 and 2021, contributing over UAH 90 billion in taxes and mandatory payments.

In 2024, Kyivstar won the Global Mobile Award (GLOMO) for "Best Mobile Innovation Supporting Emergency or Humanitarian Situations" for its Network Resilience Project at the Mobile World Congress in Barcelona.
