= Alexander Izosimov =

Alexander Vadimovich Izosimov
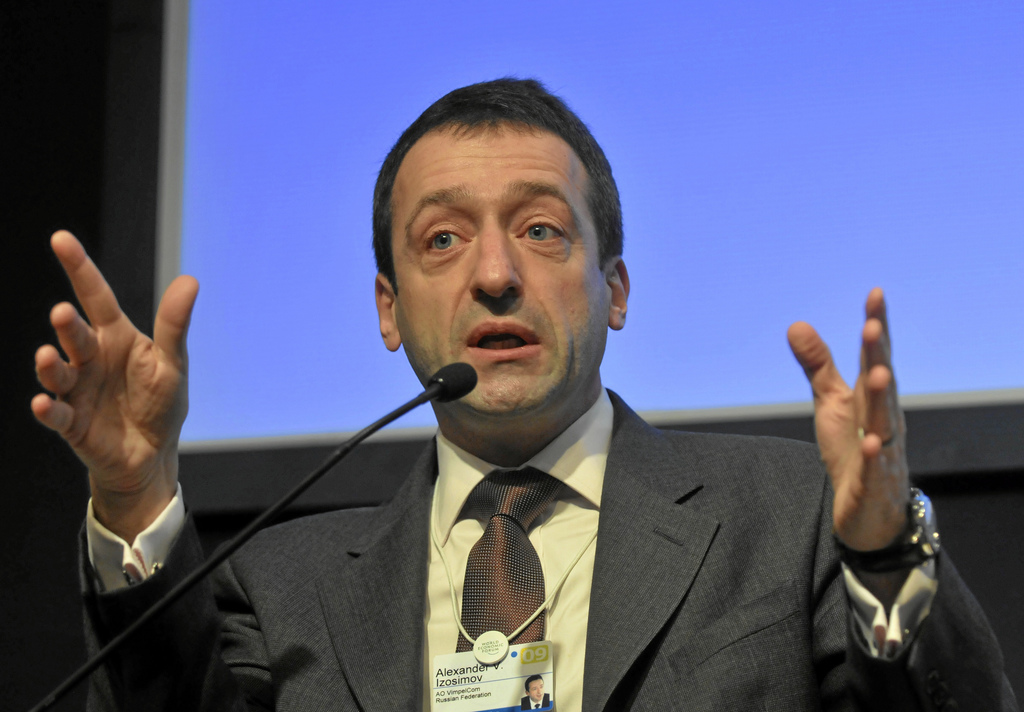
- Former general director of VimpelCom
- Born: 10 January 1964 (age 62)
- Occupation: Businessman

Alexander Vadimovich Izosimov (Russian: Алекса́ндр Вади́мович Изо́симов, born January 10, 1964 in Yakutsk, Yakut ASSR, Russian SFSR, Soviet Union) is a Russian businessman who is noted for being the CEO of Vimpelcom between October 2003 and May 2011.

== Career ==
Before 1996, Izosimov was with McKinsey & Co in Stockholm, Moscow and London.

From 2001 until 2003, he was a member of the Global Executive Management Board and Regional President for the CIS, Central Europe, and Nordic regions.

From 1996 to 2001, he was General Manager at Mars, Inc. for Russia and the CIS.

Izosimov VimpelCom, Russia's Chair for the Global Agenda Council on the Future of Mobile Communications between October 2003 and May 2011.

Currently he serves on the Boards of Directors of GSM Association, Baltika Breweries Plc, and United Confectioneries B.V.

== Education ==
Izosimov graduated from the Moscow Aviation Institute with an M.S. degree in 1987 and holds an MBA from INSEAD.

== Other ==
Izosimov bought the most expensive house in Sweden 2008, in a suburb to Stockholm. He paid 45 million Swedish kronor (5 million euro) for this house.
