= PJSC VimpelCom =

Russian telecommunications company founded in 1992

PJSC VimpelCom (ПАО «ВымпелКом»)
- Type: Public; joint-stock company
- ISIN: RU0009100044
- Industry: Mobile, telecommunications
- Predecessor: KB Impuls
- Founded: Moscow, Russia (September 15, 1992)
- Founder: Dmitry Zimin & Augie K. Fabela II
- Headquarters: Moscow, Russia
- Number of locations: all Russian regions
- Area served: Russia
- Key people: Aleksander Torbakhov (CEO)
- Products: Mobile networks, Internet, IPTV
- Revenue: ▲4.65 billion USD (2018)
- Operating income: ▲2.21 billion USD (2007)
- Net income: ▲1.46 billion USD (2007)
- Total assets: 580,000,000,000 Russian ruble (2024)
- Number of employees: 28,500
- Parent: Kopernik-Invest 3
- Divisions: Golden Telecom
- Website: about.beeline.ru

PJSC VimpelCom (Russian: ПАО «ВымпелКом» or full name Russian: ПАО «Вымпел-Коммуникации», PAO «Vympel-Kommunikatsii») is a Russian telecommunications company started in 1992 when its co-founders, Dr. Dmitry Zimin and Augie K. Fabela II came together to pioneer the Russian mobile industry. Augie Fabela, who was then a young entrepreneur from the US, and Dr. Zimin who was a Russian scientist in his 50s, together launched the Beeline brand.

PJSC VimpelCom is the third-largest wireless and second-largest telecom operator in Russia. VimpelCom's main competitors in Russia are Mobile TeleSystems and MegaFon.

PJSC VimpelCom's headquarters is located in Moscow. In 1996-2010, traded as NYSE: VIP. It was wholly owned by VEON, although in the process of being sold after VEON announced the sale of their Russian operations in November 2022. In 2022, the company's revenue amounted to 280 billion rubles. VEON completed the sale of PJSC VimpelCom in October 2023, with Aleksander Torbakhov serving as PJSC VimpelCom CEO.

== History ==
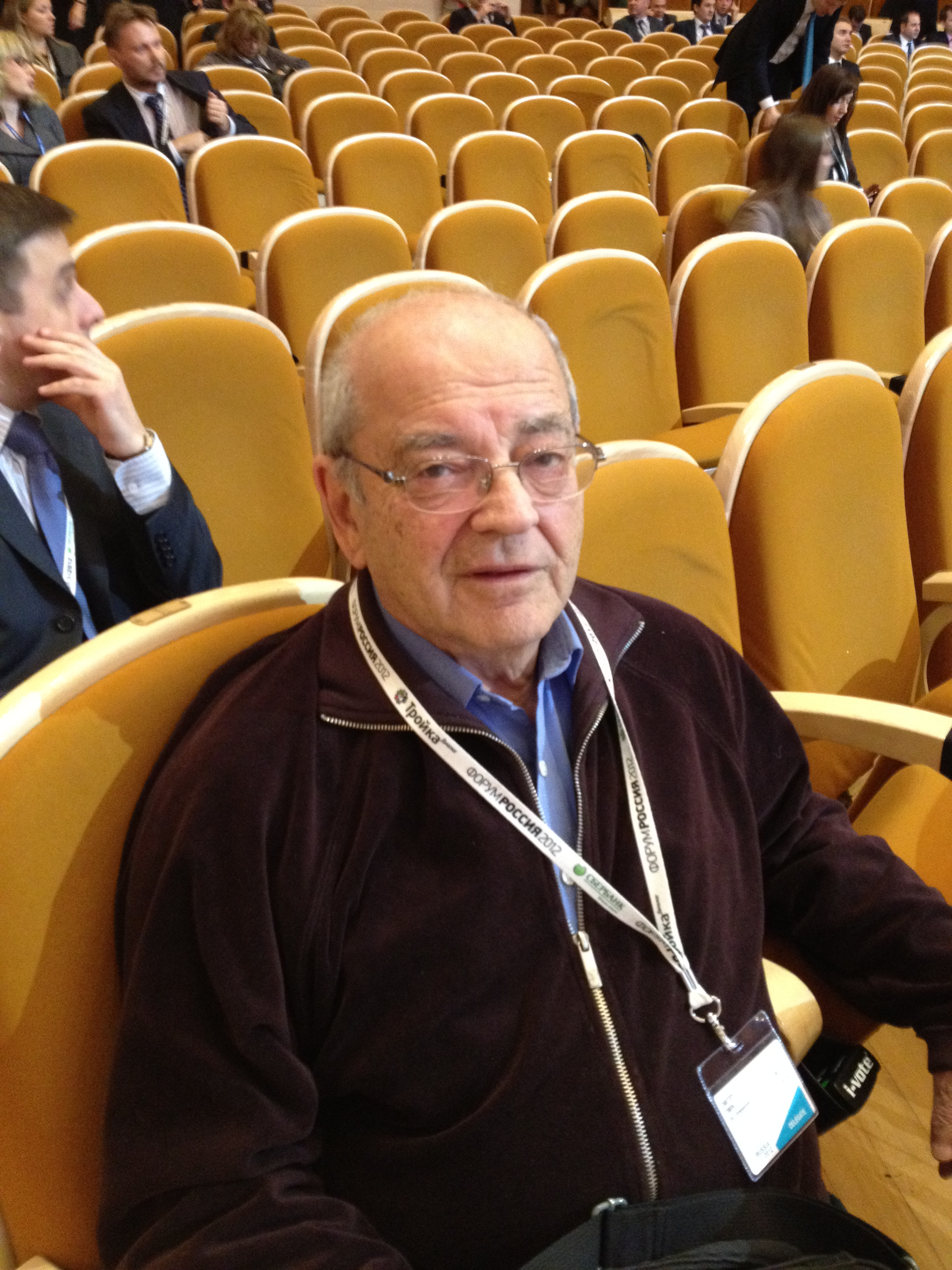
Dmitry Zimin, the founder and honorary president

Old logo of PJSC VimpelCom

The company was founded in 1992 in Moscow, Russia and initially operated AMPS/D-AMPS network in Moscow and Moscow Oblast.

The brand "Beeline" was created in 1993.

PJSC VimpelCom also acquired companies such as Russia-On-Line in 1999, Cityline and EDN Sovintel in 2001, and Corbina Telecom in 2006. It had also acquired Global TeleSystems (GTS), SovAm Teleport, GlasNet, SLTMobitel, E-Mobile, and Orascom Telecom Holding S.A.E.

In 1996 OJSC VimpelCom became the first Russian company listed on the New York Stock Exchange (NYSE: VIP).

In 1997 the company began GSM network roll-out and in 2001 it started GSM networks throughout Russia's regions.

On February 29, 2008 OJSC VimpelCom completed a merger with Golden Telecom. In October 2008 OJSC VimpelCom acquired a 49.9% stake in Euroset, the largest mobile retailer in Russia and the CIS.

In 2010 the ticker “VIP” was transferred to VimpelCom Ltd. holding. In February 2017, VimpelCom renamed itself VEON, after the messaging platform that it had developed.

On April 14, 2005, the company decreased its net income in 2002 and 2003 as a result of this restatement: 2002 - $2.8 million or 2.2%, 2003 - $5.2 million or 2.2%.

On November 24, 2022, VEON announced that it had entered into an agreement to sell its Russian subsidiary PJSC VimpelCom to the subsidiary's local management team. PJSC VimpelCom was valued at approximately $6.1 billion under the agreement.

== Owners and management ==
CEO - Torbakhov Alexander Yurievich.

President - Pankov Alexander Alexandrovich.
