= Veon (company) =

Multinational telecommunication services company

VEON Ltd.

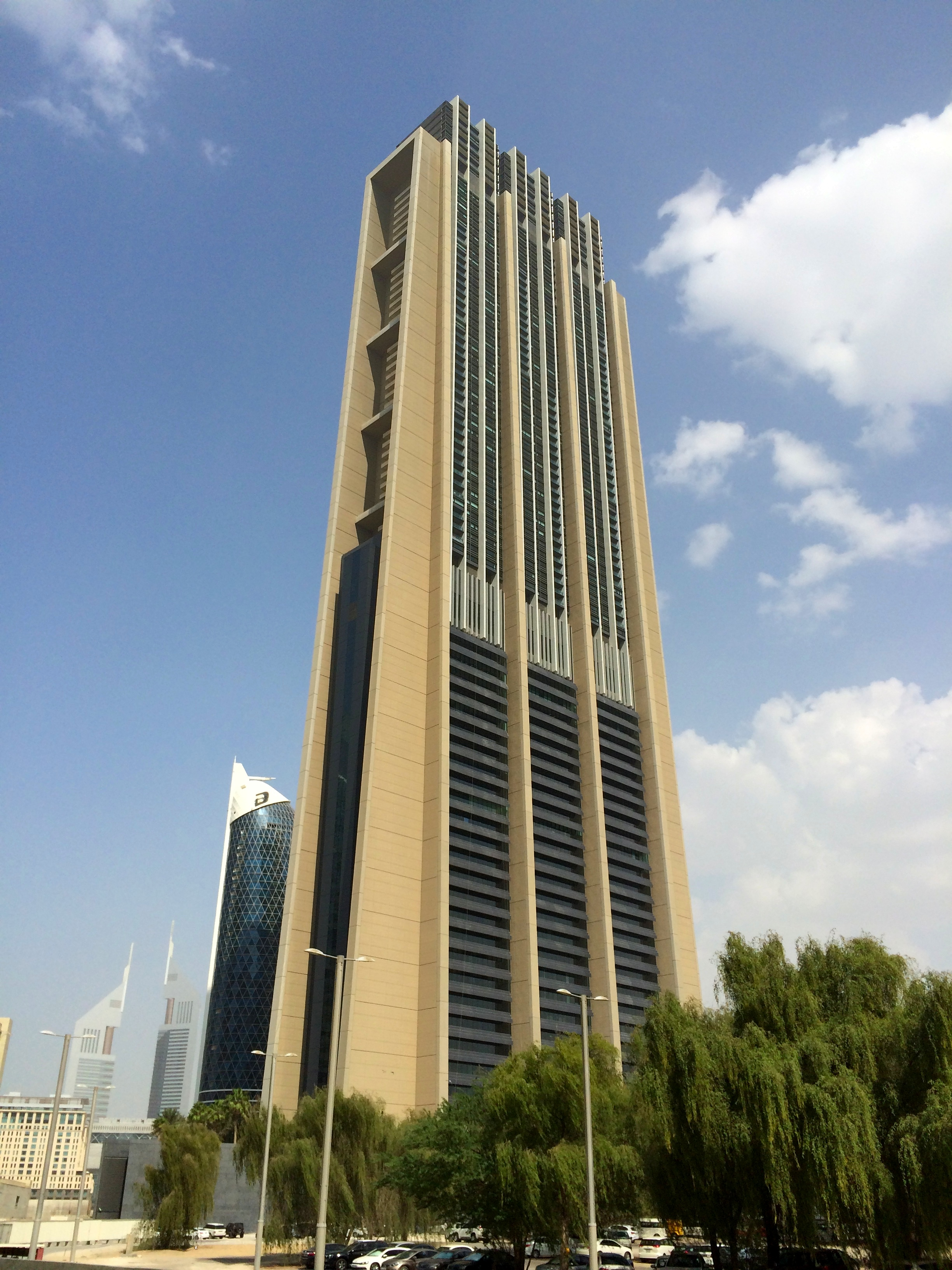
- Headquarters in The Index tower in Dubai
- Formerly: VimpelCom Ltd. (2009–2017)
- Type: Public
- Traded as: Nasdaq: VEON
- ISIN: BMG9349W1038; US91822M1062
- Industry: Telecommunications
- Predecessors: PJSC VimpelCom; Kyivstar
- Founded: 2009; 17 years ago
- Founder: Augie K Fabela II
- Headquarters: Dubai, United Arab Emirates
- Areas served: Europe; Asia
- Key people: Kaan Terzioğlu (Group CEO); Augie K Fabela II (Founder and chairman)
- Products: Mobile telephony, mobile phones retailing, international telephony, broadband Internet, IPTV, city-wide Wi-Fi, domain name registrar and others
- Brands: Beeline
- Revenue: ▲US$4.4 billion (2025)
- Net income: ▲US$591 million (2025)
- Total assets: ▲US$9.2 billion (2025)
- Owners: LPE Middle East Limited (LetterOne) (45.46%); Stichting Administratiekantoor Mobile Telecommunications Investor (7.89%); Lingotto Investment Management LLP (Exor) (8.17%); Shah Capital Management Inc. (6.62%)
- Number of employees: 18,938 (2025)
- Divisions: Kyivstar; Jazz; Mobilink Bank; Banglalink; Beeline
- Website: www.veon.com

VEON Ltd. (formerly known as VimpelCom Ltd.), also known as VEON Group, is a multinational telecommunications and digital services company. Headquartered in Dubai, United Arab Emirates, the company is publicly traded on the U.S.-based Nasdaq stock exchange.

VEON operates in five markets in Europe and Asia: Bangladesh, Kazakhstan, Pakistan, Ukraine, and Uzbekistan. Its principal telecommunications brands include Banglalink in Bangladesh, Jazz in Pakistan, Kyivstar in Ukraine, and Beeline in Kazakhstan and Uzbekistan.

As of the second quarter of 2026, VEON reported 151.5 million mobile subscribers. Its digital services recorded 227.7 million users active during the quarter in aggregate; VEON's definition of digital customers may count the same user more than once when the user is active across multiple services.

== History ==
=== 2009–2016 ===
VEON Ltd. was founded in 2009 as VimpelCom Ltd., a multinational holding company. Incorporated in Bermuda and headquartered in the Netherlands, VimpelCom was formed when Telenor and Alfa agreed to merge their assets in the telecommunications companies PJSC VimpelCom and Kyivstar. At the time of the incorporation, Kyivstar was Ukraine's largest wireless operator, while PJSC VimpelCom was the second-largest telecommunications operator in Russia. Kyivstar had been founded in 1994 by Ihor Lytovchenko, who also served as its long-term CEO. PJSC VimpelCom, founded in 1992 by American businessman Augie K Fabela II and Dmitry Zimin, was established as a mobile carrier. It launched its Beeline brand in 1993 and listed on the New York Stock Exchange in 1996.

Company logo until 2017

Under CEO Alexander Izosimov, VimpelCom acquired Orascom Telecom and Wind from Naguib Sawiris in 2011. After a number of acquisitions, as of 31 December 2011 VimpelCom had 205 million customers across 20 countries, and by 2012 it was the 13th-largest mobile network operator in the world by number of subscribers. The company switched its listing from the NYSE Euronext to the Nasdaq on 10 September 2013. It sold its majority stake in Wind Mobile to Globalive in 2014 for US$272 million. In 2015, the government of Algeria acquired VimpelCom's 51% stake in Djezzy for US$2.6 billion.

Between 2006 and 2012, VimpelCom and its Uzbek subsidiary Unitel made more than US$114 million in bribery payments in connection with entering and continuing to operate in the Uzbek telecommunications market. U.S. prosecutors later identified the recipient as Gulnara Karimova, daughter of former Uzbek president Islam Karimov. The investigations also concerned VimpelCom's prior dealings with Takilant Ltd.

In February 2016, VimpelCom reached resolutions with the U.S. Securities and Exchange Commission, the United States Department of Justice and Dutch authorities over violations related to its business in Uzbekistan. VimpelCom paid approximately US$795 million in fines and disgorgement, while Unitel entered a guilty plea in the United States. The resolutions also required VimpelCom to retain an independent compliance monitor for three years to assess its compliance program, internal accounting controls, recordkeeping and financial reporting procedures.

VimpelCom reported revenue of US$9.78 billion in 2016, while its assets were reported at US$33.85 billion.

=== 2017–2022 ===
In February 2017, VimpelCom renamed itself VEON, after the messaging platform that it had developed. The company said the rebranding was part of a shift towards positioning itself as a technology company rather than solely a telecommunications firm. VEON began listing its shares on Euronext Amsterdam in April 2017. In July 2017, VEON launched a personal internet platform named VEON in Ukraine, Bangladesh, Pakistan, Italy and Georgia. Following a number of divestments and a business transformation, by mid-2017 VEON had around 200 million combined subscribers across 12 markets.

In March 2018, CEO Jean-Yves Charlier resigned, and CEO duties were temporarily assumed by VEON's chair, Ursula Burns. Burns was appointed CEO in December 2018 while remaining chair. In October 2019, VEON hired Sergi Herrero and former Turkcell CEO Kaan Terzioğlu as joint chief operating officers. They succeeded Burns as co-CEOs in February 2020, and in June 2020 Gennady Gazin succeeded Burns as chairman.

In 2020, VEON purchased the remaining 15% stake in Jazz from Abu Dhabi Group, giving it full ownership. The company also sold its Armenian operations to Team LLC in 2020. In July 2021, Terzioğlu became VEON's Group CEO, with oversight of VEON's executives and regional CEOs assigned to separate markets. The company sold its Georgia unit for US$45 million in June 2022. In August 2022, VEON completed the sale of its remaining stake in Djezzy to the government of Algeria for US$682 million.

Following Russia's full-scale invasion of Ukraine in February 2022, VEON announced the sale of its Russian operations in November 2022.

=== 2023–2025 ===
VEON completed the sale of its Russian operations on 9 October 2023, ending its presence in the Russian market. Following the sale, the company reduced the size of its board from 11 to seven members.

On 25 November 2024, VEON delisted its shares from Euronext Amsterdam, leaving Nasdaq as the company's sole public trading venue. In December 2024, the company moved its group headquarters from Amsterdam to the Dubai International Financial Centre in the United Arab Emirates.

In August 2025, VEON completed the sale of its 50.1% indirect stake in Sky Mobile, which operates under the Beeline brand in Kyrgyzstan, to state-owned Eldik Bank. On 15 August, shares of Kyivstar began trading on Nasdaq under the ticker symbol KYIV, making it the first Ukrainian company to list on a United States stock exchange.

For 2025, VEON reported total revenue of US$4.399 billion, compared with US$4.004 billion in 2024.

== Owners ==
VEON's major shareholders as of 1 March 2026 were:

- 45.46% of common shares held by LPE Middle East Limited, an affiliate of LetterOne
- 7.89% held by Stichting Administratiekantoor Mobile Telecommunications Investor
- 8.17% held by Lingotto Investment Management LLP
- 6.62% held by Shah Capital Management Inc.

== Subsidiaries ==
VEON operates telecommunications and digital-services businesses in five markets.

- Banglalink (Bangladesh) – VEON's telecommunications and digital-services operator in Bangladesh, with 35.0 million mobile subscribers in the second quarter of 2026.
- Beeline (Kazakhstan) – VEON's telecommunications and digital-services operator in Kazakhstan, with 11.7 million mobile subscribers in the second quarter of 2026.
- Jazz (Pakistan) – VEON's telecommunications and digital-services operator in Pakistan, with 75.4 million mobile subscribers in the second quarter of 2026. Jazz launched 5G services in March 2026.
- Kyivstar (Ukraine) – VEON's telecommunications and digital-services operator in Ukraine, with 21.8 million mobile subscribers in the second quarter of 2026. Kyivstar began trading on Nasdaq in August 2025, becoming the first Ukrainian company listed on a U.S. stock exchange.
- Beeline (Uzbekistan) – VEON's telecommunications and digital-services operator in Uzbekistan, with 7.7 million mobile subscribers in the second quarter of 2026.

== See also ==
- Telecommunications in Ukraine
- List of mobile network operators
- List of telecommunication companies in Pakistan
