= Telecommunications in Ukraine =

Telecommunications is one of the most modern, diverse and fast-growing sectors in the economy of Ukraine. Unlike the country's dominating export industries, telecommunications, as well as the related Internet sector, remain largely unaffected by the global economic crisis, ranking high in European and global rankings.

The industry also leads in demonopolisation of Ukraine's economy as Ukrtelekom (once the country's sole telephone provider) was successfully privatised, and is now losing its retail market share to independent, foreign-invested private providers.

The entire population of Ukraine now has telephone and/or mobile phone connection; (Note: Except for a few very remote and sparsely inhabited settlements.) Internet access is universally available in cities and main transport corridors, expanding into smaller settlements. In 2025 the communications sector recorded 16.5% revenue growth to UAH 178.6 billion despite wartime infrastructure damage and power outages.

Ukraine's telecommunication development plan emphasises further improving domestic trunk lines, international connections, and the mobile cellular system. The sector has shown resilience through satellite backhaul and direct-to-cell services.

During the Russian invasion of Ukraine, telecommunications were supported by the Starlink satellite service.

== Internet audience ==
As of January 2025 Ukraine had 31.5 million internet users, equating to 82.4% penetration of the population. Mobile broadband dominates access; fixed broadband subscriptions stood at 19.68 per 100 people in 2023. Usage remains high for social media, digital government services such as Diia, and e-commerce, even under wartime conditions and blackouts.

== International data network ==
Two new domestic trunk lines are a part of the fibre-optic Trans-Asia-Europe (TAE) system and three Ukrainian links have been installed in the fibre-optic Trans-European Lines (TEL) project that connects 18 countries; additional international service is provided by the Italy-Turkey-Ukraine-Russia (ITUR) fibre-optic submarine cable and by earth stations in the Intelsat, Inmarsat, and Intersputnik satellite systems.

Ukraine maintains multiple redundant fibre-optic routes to the European Union via Poland, Romania, Slovakia and Hungary. Since the 2022 invasion, Starlink satellite backhaul and, from November 2025, direct-to-cell integration have provided redundancy against attacks on terrestrial infrastructure.

== Fixed telephone network ==
Telephones - land lines in use: 1.43 million (2023)

Upon gaining independence from the USSR in 1991, Ukraine inherited an analogue PSTN telephone system that was antiquated, inefficient, and in many places in disrepair; meanwhile demand overwhelmed the supply with more than 3.5 million household applications for telephone lines pending. Telephone density has since risen and the domestic trunk system is being improved; about one-third of Ukraine's networks are digital, and the majority of regional centres now have digital switching stations. Improvements in local networks and local exchanges continue to lag.

Several independent fixed network providers established themselves in the country's retail market, although Ukrtelecom still dominates it. Fixed-line usage has collapsed as mobile and VoIP solutions prevail.

== Mobile phone networks ==
The mobile cellular telephone system's expansion has slowed, largely due to market saturation and the effects of the Russian invasion, including population displacement, loss of territory and infrastructure damage. Total active subscriptions stood at 47.5 million as of mid-2025, equal to about 119% of the estimated population and down from a pre-war peak of about 60.8 million.

Telephones - mobile cellular: 47.5 million (mid-2025)

=== Mobile phone operators ===
Rank	Operator	Technology	Subscribers (in millions)	Ownership	MCC / MNC
1	Kyivstar; Including previous Beeline Ukraine network	900/1800 MHz GSM (GPRS, EDGE); 2100 MHz UMTS, HSDPA, HSUPA, HSPA, HSPA+, DC-HSPA+ 900/1800/2100/2300/2600 MHz LTE, LTE-A; VoLTE	22.4 (mid-2025)	VEON (Nasdaq-listed)	25503 and 25502
2	Vodafone; Formerly MTS Ukraine	900/1800 MHz GSM (GPRS, EDGE); 2100 MHz UMTS, HSDPA, HSUPA, HSPA, HSPA+, DC-HSPA+ 900/1800/2100/2600 MHz LTE, LTE-A	15.4 (2025)	NEQSOL Holding	25501
3	Lifecell; Formerly Life	900/1800 MHz GSM (GPRS, EDGE); 2100 MHz UMTS, HSDPA, HSUPA, HSPA, HSPA+, DC-HSPA+, 3C-HSDPA; 900/1800/2100/2600 MHz LTE, LTE-A, LTE-A Pro	about 10 (2025 estimate)	DVL Group	25506
4	Intertelecom	800 MHz CDMA2000, CDMA2000 EV-DO rel.0, rev. A, rev. B The gradual shutdown of the network began in many regions in 2020.	less than 1 (2025 phase-out)	Odinaco Ltd (49%), Viktor Gushan (35.7%)	25504
5	TriMob	2100 MHz UMTS, HSDPA, HSUPA, HSPA; Own 3G network in Kyiv city centre only. Free 2G/3G roaming on Vodafone network available.	about 0.2 (2025)	Ukrtelecom	25507
6	PEOPLEnet	800 MHz CDMA2000, CDMA2000 EV-DO; Network in Dnipropetrovsk region only.	less than 0.1 (2025)	Telesystemy Ukrainy	25521

The subscriber base contracted from pre-2022 peaks due to the Russian invasion, emigration and loss of territory in occupied regions. Kyivstar held about 47% market share in mid-2025. In January 2026, Kyivstar launched Ukraine's first 5G pilot in Lviv; the company said a nationwide rollout remained contingent on the end of the war.

== Mobile phone manufacturers ==
The following companies in Ukraine are manufacturing mobile phones:

- Borton
- Impression Electronics

== Radio broadcast stations ==
Several hundred licensed FM and AM radio stations operate nationwide.

== Internet in Ukraine ==
- Country code - .ua
- Internet users: 31.5 million (January 2025)
- Internet penetration: 82.4% (January 2025)

== History ==
In 2004–2005 the Internet Association of Ukraine launched UA-VoIX, an IP-telephony traffic exchange point for Ukrainian providers; the software for the project was supplied by the Ukrainian company IXC.

=== Russian invasion of Ukraine ===
Ukraine's military and government rapidly became dependent on SpaceX's Starlink satellite services during Russia's invasion of Ukraine in 2022, as Russia attacked key infrastructure including telecommunications infrastructure, and Ukraine was experiencing significant problems with Internet access.

Satellite internet from SpaceX had key telecommunications role such as in the Siege of Azovstal (15 April–20 May), which helped Ukrainian defenders to resist Russian troops in Mariupol.

While military and government use of Starlink has been the most important aspect of opening Ukraine to low-altitude satellite internet services in early 2022, civilians are also heavily using the technology "to keep in touch with the outside world and tell loved ones that they are alive." During the war, Ukrainians can use Starlink terminals without paying the usual monthly subscription fee.

To pay for the cost of Starlink in Ukraine, SpaceX donated services valued at an estimated $100 million, while an unknown amount was secured by several European countries and the US government. In June 2023, The Pentagon communicated that the Department of Defense signed a contract with SpaceX's Starlink to buy those satellite services for Ukraine.

The use of Starlink in Russian-occupied territories in Ukraine was however restricted by SpaceX, according to Ukrainian officials.

In November 2025 Kyivstar became the first European mobile operator to launch Starlink direct-to-cell satellite service for 4G smartphones, initially enabling SMS with voice and data planned for 2026. By March 2026, Kyivstar said 5 million customers had connected to the Kyivstar-SpaceX network and more than 7 million SMS messages had been transmitted through the satellite network. More than 50,000 traditional Starlink terminals remain deployed in Ukraine.

== Telecommunications-related government bodies ==
- Ministry of Infrastructure of Ukraine (Official website (in Ukrainian))
- State Special Communications Service of Ukraine (Official website)
- National Commission for the State Regulation of Communications and Informatization of Ukraine (Official website)
- Ministry of Digital Transformation of Ukraine

== See also ==
- Internet in Ukraine
- Mobile phone industry in Ukraine
