= Mobile phone industry in Ukraine =

The Mobile phone industry in Ukraine started in 1993 in analog, and its digital industry showed rapid growth, although there have been ups and downs.

== Overview ==
Ukraine's first mobile phone service began with analog NMT in 1993, and digital GSM, using 900 MHz and 1800 MHz, since 1997 and 2000, respectively. The mobile phone market since developed rapidly, although there were ups and downs, till it reached 54,800,000 users by the end of 2021.

== Mobile phone carriers ==
There are now three large mobile phone carriers that serve throughout Ukraine: Kyivstar, Vodafone and lifecell. All these three use GSM, but there are CDMA carriers such as Intertelecom and PEOPLEnet.

=== Kyivstar ===
Kyivstar is Ukraine's largest mobile operator, claiming 48 percent of the market. The company is under VEON, a Netherlands company, whose major shareholder is VimpelCom of Russia.

=== Vodafone ===
Vodafone Ukraine is the second largest carrier with a 35 percent market share. The company was originally founded by Russia's Mobile Telesystems using Vodafone technology, but was sold to Bakcell under Azerbaijan's Neqsol Shareholding Company.

=== lifecell ===
lifecell with a 17 percent market share is under the Turkish mobile company, Turkcell.

== Devices ==
Various devices imported or manufactured in Ukraine have been used.

== 21st century wartime ==
The 2014 Annexation of Crimea by Russia and the 2022 Russian invasion of Ukraine have done limited damage on Ukraine's mobile phone infrastructure. Where damaged, the mobile network is in some cases supported by SpaceX's Starlink satellites.

== Gallery ==
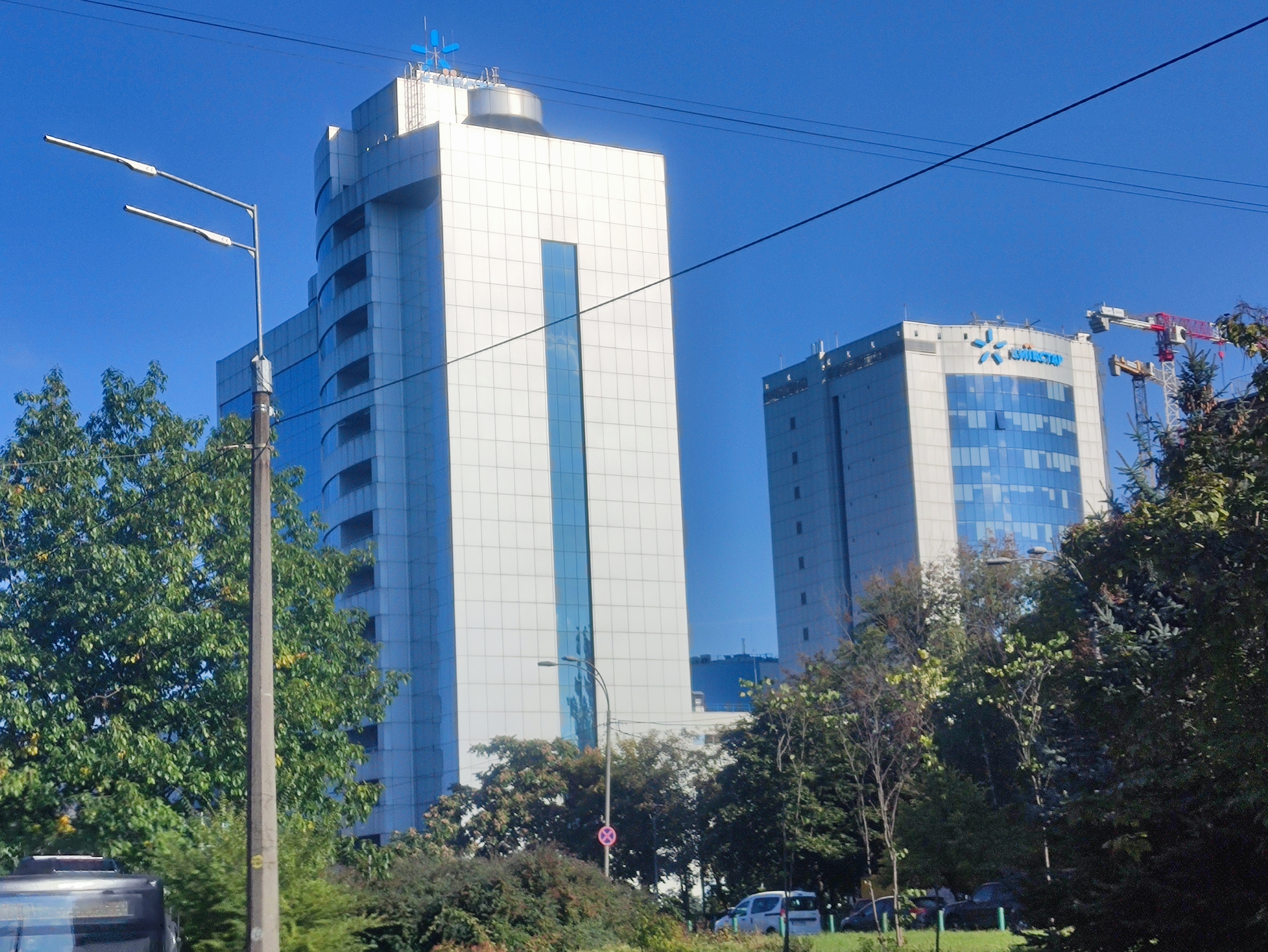
The headquarters of Kyivstar (in Kyiv)

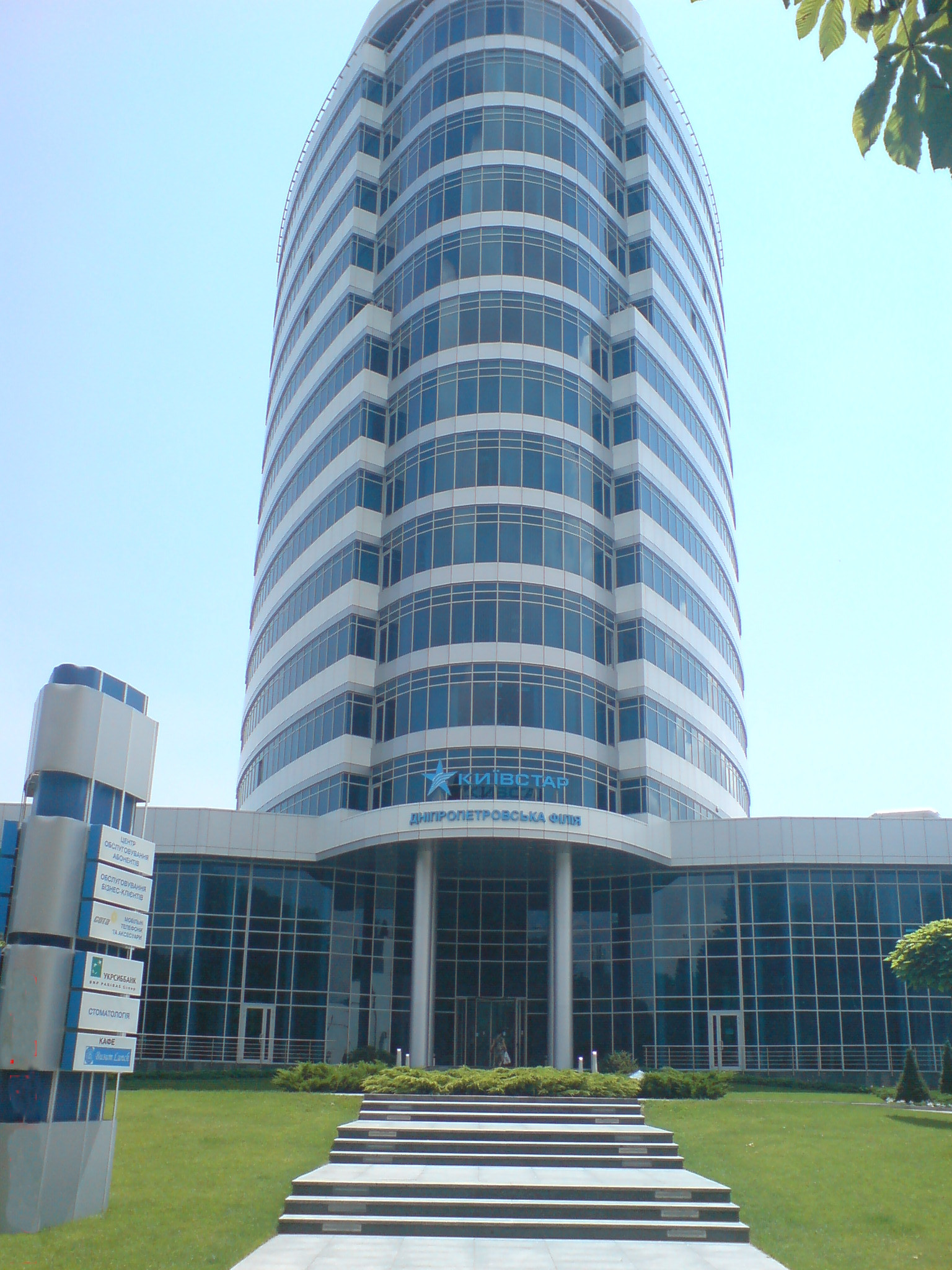
The regional branch of a mobile phone carrier (in Dnipro)

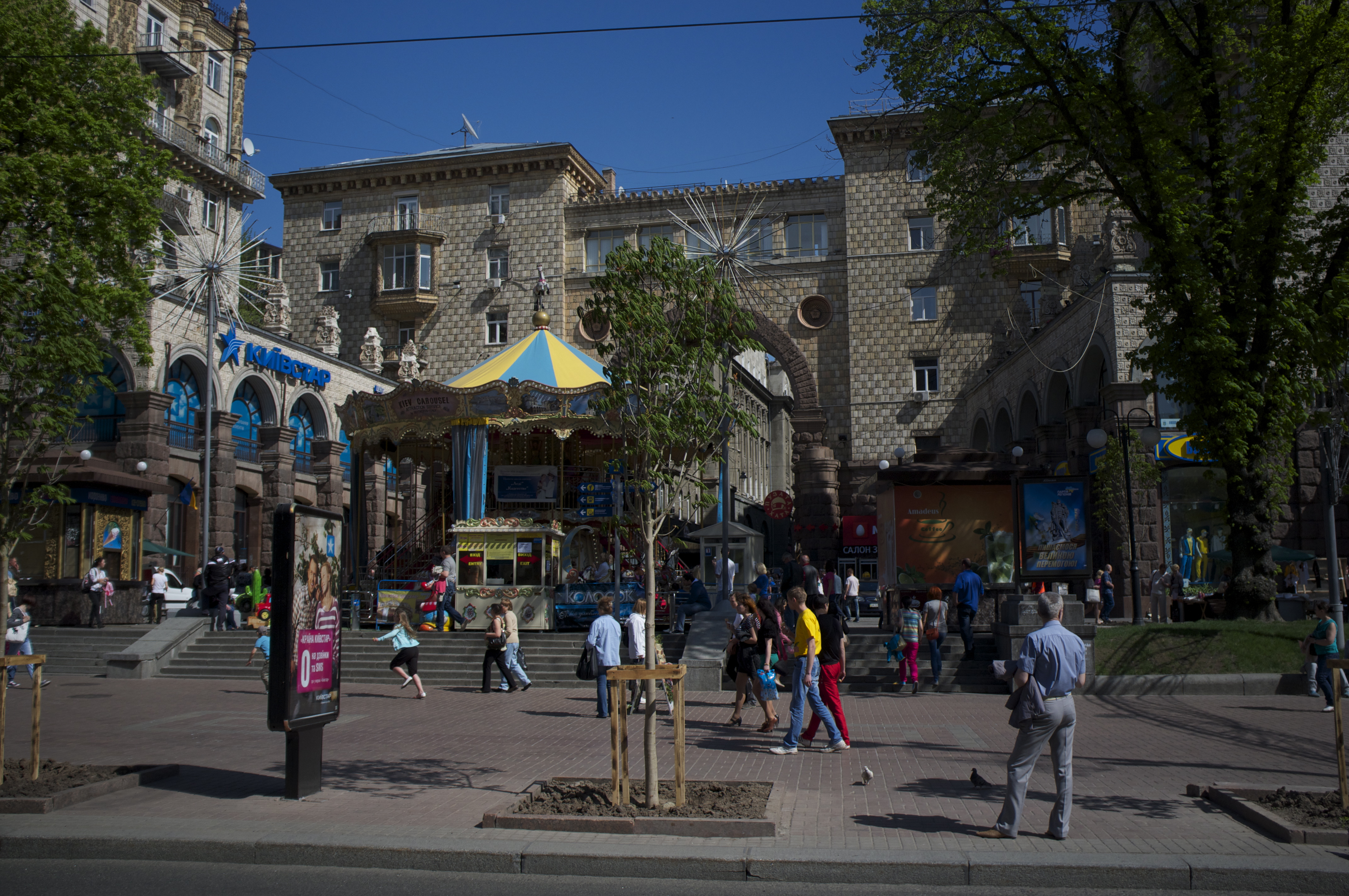
A mobile phone store on a square

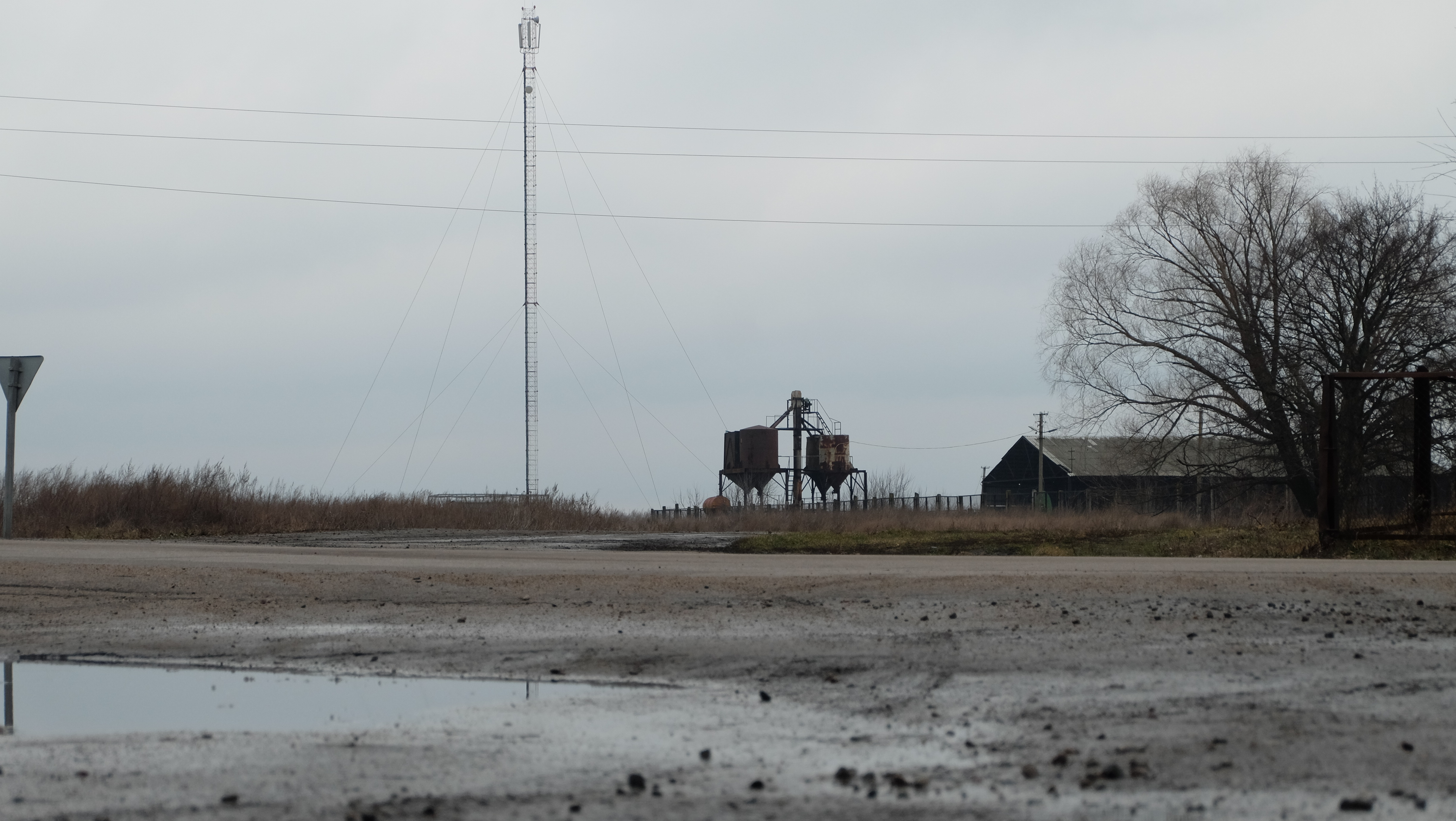
A mobile phone relay tower (in Stavi village)

== See also ==
- Mobile phone networks in Ukraine
- Mobile phone industry in Russia
