= 2022 drone attack on the Sevastopol Naval Base =

Attack during Russian invasion of Ukraine

- Part of the Crimea attacks of the Russo-Ukrainian war
- Date: October 29, 2022; 4:20 (UTC+3)
- Location: Sevastopol Naval Base, Crimea

On 29 October 2022, there was a large-scale attack by aerial drones and drone boats on the Black Sea Fleet in Sevastopol during the Russo-Ukrainian war.

== Course of events ==
On the morning of 29 October 2022, the Russian governor of Sevastopol in Russian-occupied Crimea, Mykhailo Razvozhaev, announced the attack by drones on the ships of the Black Sea Fleet of the Russian Federation, which are in the waters of the Sevastopol Bay. Rozvozhayev called this attack the largest since 24 February, the day Russia's invasion of Ukraine began. According to Razvozhaev, nine drones and seven autonomous marine unmanned vehicles participated in the operation.

According to the Russian TASS, at 4:20 a.m. on 29 October, a loud explosion was heard, after which several more "bangs" were heard. Telegram channels began to spread videos showing black smoke over Sevastopol and hearing explosions.

While it is unknown how the drones communicated in the attack, this operation used similar black naval drones to one found with a Starlink terminal on it. Ukraine also had later similar attacks carried out using the civilian Starlink network for communications to guide them to target.

== Outcome ==
The Ministry of Defense of Russia reported that as a result of the attack, the Natya-class minesweeper Ivan Golubets was damaged, as well as the barrage in Yuzhnaya Bay. The Russian Ministry of Defense stated that the attacked ships were "involved in ensuring the security of the grain corridor as part of the export of food from Ukrainian ports".

Ukrainian telegram channels reported that four Russian warships may have been damaged during the attack, including the frigate Admiral Makarov, from which Russian troops launched Kalibr missiles at targets on the territory of Ukraine. From this ship, in particular, an attack was made on Vinnytsia on July 14, 2022. Admiral Makarov was hit by one drone boat and was then fired on by Russian artillery until it identified itself.

GeoConfirmed analysts believe that between six and eight drones were involved in the attack on the Russian ships and that they hit at least three ships; two naval drones were most likely destroyed.

== Reaction ==
After the attacks, the Russian authorities decided to block the residents of Sevastopol from accessing broadcasts from the city's surveillance cameras, saying that they "give the enemy the opportunity to detect the city's defense systems."

Russia blamed Ukraine and the United Kingdom for the attack, Representatives of the Russian authorities said that the attack was carried out "under the leadership of British specialists located in the city of Ochakiv, Mykolaiv region of Ukraine." At the same time, the Russians stated that this same unit of "British specialists" was involved in the "terrorist act in the Baltic Sea" when the Nord Stream and Nord Stream 2 gas pipelines were blown up. Representatives of Great Britain called these statements "a lie of an epic scale".

In response to the attack, Russia announced the "suspension" of participation in the agreement on the export of Ukrainian grain through the Black Sea. Before these events, Ukraine warned about Russia's plans to withdraw from the "grain agreement".

== See also ==
- Crimea attacks
  - 2022 Saky air base attack
  - Crimean Bridge explosion
- Starlink satellite services in Ukraine, likely used for the attack
