= Internet in Ukraine =

The Internet in Ukraine is well developed and steadily growing.

As of 2011, Ukraine was ranked 9th in the "Top 10 Internet countries in Europe", with then 33.9% Internet penetration and 15.3 million users; growing to 36.8% in 2012. However, as of January 2021 about 30 million Ukrainians (85% of the country's population older than 15) were Internet users.

In 2011, online retailing turnover in Ukraine exceeded US$2 bn. For 2012, it was expected to reach US$4 bn. Online payments in the country in 2011 where estimated at US$400 million, 200% growth compared to 2010.

As of September 2020, Ukraine ranked 59th among the world's countries by the fixed broadband Internet access speed, with an average download speed of 59.13 mbit/s, and 80th by the mobile network Internet access speed with 25.63 mbit/s.

Freedom House concluded that the Internet in Ukraine is "Partly Free" in 2019 and 2020.

A Research & Branding Group February 2021 poll found that for the first time Ukrainians preferred the Internet as their primary news source instead of television (51% preferred the Internet and 41% TV).

During the Russian invasion of Ukraine, Internet was partly provided by the Starlink satellite service.

== Internet audience ==
According to GlobalLogic, 85% of Ukraine's population older than 15 have had access to Internet in January 2021.

Data from database: World Development Indicators Last Updated: 10/14/2016 indicates the data below

Year	Population	Penetration	Internet Users	Change from previous year
2000	49,175,848	0.72%	352,189	
2001	48,683,865	1.24%	603,076	71.2%
2002	48,202,500	1.87%	903,259	49.8%
2003	47,812,950	3.15%	1,505,213	66.6%
2004	47,451,600	3.49%	1,655,813	10.0%
2005	47,105,150	3.75%	1,766,332	6.7%
2006	46,787,750	4.51%	2,108,314	19.4%
2007	46,509,350	6.55%	3,046,362	44.5%
2008	46,258,200	11.00%	5,088,402	67.0%
2009	46,053,300	17.90%	8,243,541	62.0%
2010	45,870,700	23.30%	10,687,873	29.7%
2011	45,706,100	28.71%	13,121,427	22.8%
2012	45,593,300	35.27%	16,080,757	22.6%
2013	45,489,600	40.95%	18,629,869	15.9%
2014	45,362,900	46.24%	20,973,979	12.6%
2015	45,198,200	49.26%	22,264,633	6.2%
2016	44,194,413	52.5%	23,202,067	4.2%

== Internet services ==
In 2011, the number of subscribers to Internet service providers in Ukraine had increased compared to 2010 by 13.3% to 4,148,658. After the 3rd quarter of 2012, the number of broadband subscribers alone exceeded that figure, grown to 6,700,000. 2011 revenues from Internet service providing in Ukraine reached ₴4.75 billion (US$595 million). It is unclear whether these numbers include mobile Internet services which are provided by all of Ukraine's mobile phone operators.

=== Access technologies ===
All existing standards of Internet access are available in Ukraine, with broadband services mostly limited to cities.

Mobile GPRS access is available in vast majority of Ukraine's territory, including all urban areas and airports, most roads and railway lines, many coastal waters. 3G mobile access market is steadily developing. Public Wi-Fi hotspots are widespread throughout cities. There are plans and projects for providing mass wireless broadband access in urban open spaces, on Ukrzaliznytsia long-distance trains and in urban public transport vehicles. According to Ericsson ConsumerLab, 36% of Ukraine's urban population access the Internet via mobile phone or smartphone.

According to the iKS-Consulting, there were 6 700 000 broadband subscribers in Ukraine as of 3Q 2012; 5.97 million of them were households, which amounts to 34% broadband Internet penetration of all country's households. The consultancy estimated broadband providing revenues in the 3rd quarter of 2012 at ₴1.36 billion (US$167 million), which is the growth 13.7% compared to 3Q 2011 results.

Thousands of national, regional and local ISP operate in Ukraine, with as much 14 ISPs competing for every household client in the capital city Kyiv.

=== Major Internet service providers ===
According to Expert & Consulting (E&C), the top-10 Ukrainian fixed Broadband Internet service providers had about 3.36 million subscribers as of the 2nd quarter of 2012; as of the 3rd quarter, that figure rose to about 3,46 million subscribers. According to estimations of Expert & Consulting (E&C), there were 7,06 mln. subscribers of fixed Broadband Internet at the end of 1st half of 2013.

Ukrtelecom is the largest Internet access provider (as well as fixed telephone provider) and was the only UMTS 3G provider in Ukraine until 2015, when all three major operators (Vodafone, Kyivstar and Lifecell) have gained the licensing and set up their own 3G networks. In particular, it was serving over 1.4 million DSL/ISDN fixed access clients in June 2012. The second-largest provider Volia is a major player specializing in cable access combined with TV signal. Both MTS and Kyivstar (Ukraine's largest mobile phone operators) also offer fixed broadband access along with their mobile Internet services.

== Social networks ==
=== Facebook ===
There were 1,686,500 Facebook users in Ukraine in 2011 and over 3,000,000 in October 2013. According to the Internet Association of Ukraine 13 million Ukrainians used Facebook in 2019. In 2018, this number had increased by 3 million or 30%, and in the previous five years by 9.8 million or 306.2%. The Internet Association of Ukraine claimed in November 2019 that Facebook was the most popular social network of Ukraine.

=== Twitter ===
According to the Google Analytics, in 2012 the number of daily Twitter visitors from Ukraine reaches 120,000 while the "Yandex.Ukraine" estimated the number of Ukrainian users at 500,000, and GfK Ukraine, a market research company, found that a quarter of Ukrainian Twitter users ignore their accounts completely, while 28 percent check them only occasionally. Ukrainian politician Yulia Tymoshenko was the most followed Twitter user in Ukraine as of early 2012, with 91,547 followers.

A Research & Branding Group February 2021 poll found 6% of Ukrainians used Twitter.

=== Instagram ===
According to research by PlusOne Communications Group in March 2019 Ukraine had 11 million Instagram users. Ukrainians under the age of 30 used Instagram more than Facebook. According to the Internet Association of Ukraine 3.8 million people used the network in 2017, in 2018 this had been 7.3 million people.

=== Telegram ===
A Research & Branding Group February 2021 poll found 17% of Ukrainians used Telegram. According to the pollster the number of its users in Ukraine had tripled since 2018.

=== VK ===
According to Alexa Internet ranking, in 2013 VK was the most visited website in Ukraine. According to the company, in January 2012 VK had more than 20 million registered users from Ukraine (out of a total of 155 million users worldwide); 6.6 million of them visited the site daily. As of February 2013, VK's mean daily audience in Ukraine grew to 9.35 million (according to LiveInternet), which amounted to 20.2% of the network's mean daily global traffic.

On 16 May 2017, President Poroshenko signed a decree requiring providers to block access to VK, as it was claimed they participated in an information war against Ukraine.

According to the Internet Association of Ukraine the share of Ukrainian Internet users who visit VK daily had fallen from 54% to 10% from September 2016 to September 2019. For 2019 VK appeared as the most visited social network in Ukraine according to Alexa. The Internet Association of Ukraine claimed in November 2019 that Facebook was the most popular social network of Ukraine. A Research & Branding Group February 2021 poll found 5% of Ukrainians continued to use VK.

== Internet-based commerce and trade ==
=== Online retail ===
According to the 2013 TEMAX index by the GfK, Ukraine's online house appliances and consumer electronics market is the second fastest-growing in Europe (after the Turkish), with estimated 2012 size of ₴5,000,000,000. There were estimated 5,000–7,000 online shops in operation across the country, with about 1,300 of them working in the house appliances and consumer electronics sector.

=== Online ticketing ===
E-ticketing is rapidly growing in Ukraine, being recently boosted by the Ukrzaliznytsia national railway operator's implementation of its own online booking system, available in Ukrainian and English. Tickets for all regular airline flights and vast majority of the intercity bus services are also available for booking or purchase through independent online service providers.

=== Online banking ===
The vast majority of Ukraine's banks offer online banking (usually free of charge). Payments for vast and growing number of services are accepted online (both through the ATM card payments systems and the independent electronic money facilitators); all possible payments from a person are typically accepted online in big cities.

== Internet censorship and surveillance ==
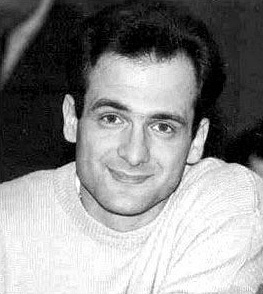
Georgiy Gongadze, Ukrainian journalist, founder of a popular Internet newspaper Ukrayinska Pravda, who was kidnapped and murdered in 2000.

In December 2010 the OpenNet Initiative found little evidence of Internet filtering in Ukraine in all four areas (political, social, conflict/security, and Internet tools) they tested.

In its Freedom on the Net report covering the period from May 2012 to April 2013, Freedom House found the internet in Ukraine to be "largely unhindered" and rated the internet in Ukraine as "Free" with an overall score of 28, on a scale from 0 (most free) to 100 (least free). The report said that "there is no practice of institutionalized blocking or filtering, or a regulatory framework for censorship of content online", but "there have been attempts at creating legislation which could censor or limit content" and would "present indirect threats to freedom of information online."

Access to the internet in Ukraine remains largely unfettered. Ukraine possesses relatively liberal legislation governing the Internet and access to information. The Law on Protection of Public Morals of 20 November 2003, prohibits the production and circulation of pornography; dissemination of products that propagandize war or spread national and religious intolerance; humiliation or insult to an individual or nation on the grounds of nationality, religion, or ignorance; and the propagation of "drug addiction, toxicology, alcoholism, smoking and other bad habits."

While there are no government restrictions on internet access, law enforcement bodies are known to using online monitoring, at times without permission. Bloggers and online publications have accused law enforcement agencies of interference.

The law provides for freedom of speech and press. However, the Ukrainian government does not always respect these rights in practice. Individuals can criticize the government. Libel is considered a civil offence, and the law limits the level of damages that may be claimed in libel lawsuits. The press is free to criticize express opinions, and public officials have fewer legal protections from criticism than other citizens. However, local media observers have expressed concern over high monetary damages demanded and awarded for alleged libel. The constitution prohibits arbitrary interference of privacy, family, home, or correspondence, but authorities generally do not respect these prohibitions. For example:

- On 17 August 2012, opposition politician Oleksandr Turchynov alleged that law enforcement officials monitored and tracked opposition activists without legal permission.
- On 20 August 2012, Serhiy Vlasenko, a lawyer for former prime minister Yulia Tymoshenko, alleged that authorities kept him under surveillance, tapped his telephones, and monitored his e-mail account.
- While, by law the Security Service of Ukraine (SBU) may not conduct surveillance or searches without a court-issued warrant, and citizens have the legal right to examine any dossier concerning them in the possession of the SBU and to recover losses resulting from an investigation, authorities generally do not respect these rights because implementing legislation has not been enacted, and many citizens are not aware of their rights or that authorities have violated their privacy.

A report from the Organization for Security and Co-operation in Europe (OSCE) found around 300 instances of violent attacks on the media in Ukraine from November 2013 to May 2014.

In 2014, amid increasing tensions with Russia, the Ukrainian government became more intolerant of the press. Under the impact of war and social polarization, the democratic credentials of the pro-European Kyiv government have been slipping as well. A crackdown on what authorities describe as “pro-separatist” points of view has triggered dismay among Western human rights monitors. For example, the September 11, 2014 shutdown of the independent Kyiv-based Vesti newspaper by the Ukrainian Security Service for “violating Ukraine's territorial integrity” brought condemnation from the international Committee to Protect Journalists and the Organization for Security and Cooperation in Europe.

The Ukrainian Security Service (SBU) broke into the office of a Kyiv-based digital newspaper “Vesti”, physically trapping reporters and ultimately shutting down the website.

Vesti News's editor-in-chief Igor Guzhva wrote on his Facebook page that the news outlet had been raided by SBU. The SBU reportedly took all servers, kept staffers in a "hot corridor" and shut down the website completely. Guzhva said that the purpose of the raid was "to block our work.". “Journalists are not being let into their office," Guzhva wrote. "Those who were already inside at the moment of the raid are being kept in the building and are not allowed to use cell phones.”

Guzhva said that this is the second time in just six months that the SBU has tried to "intimidate" its editors. He added that he is unsure of the reason for the raid, but suspects that it might have to do with a story the website published about the SBU chief's daughter.

On 16 May 2017, President Poroshenko signed a decree requiring providers to block access to a number of Russian websites, including four of the most popular websites in Ukraine: VKontakte, Odnoklassniki, Yandex and Mail.Ru. The president claimed they participated in an information war against Ukraine. Respondents in an online poll on the UNIAN site declared that 66% were “categorically against” the ban of Russian sites and another 11% said it would be easier to “ban the whole internet, like in North Korea”. The move was widely criticised as censorship, and Reporters Without Borders condemned the ban, calling it a "disproportionate measure that seriously undermines the Ukrainian people's right to information and freedom of expression."

== During the Russian invasion of Ukraine ==
=== Starlink ===
Ukraine's military and government rapidly became dependent on SpaceX's Starlink satellite services during Russian's invasion of Ukraine in 2022, as Russia attacked key infrastructures including telecommunication ones, and Ukraine was experiencing significant problems with Internet access.

While military and government use of the Starlink has been the most important aspect of opening Ukraine to low-altitude satellite internet services in early 2022, civilians are also heavily using the technology "to keep in touch with the outside world and tell loved ones that they are alive." During the war, Ukrainians can use Starlink terminals without paying the usual monthly subscription fee.

To pay for the cost of Starlink in Ukraine, SpaceX donated for an estimate of over $100 million, while an unknown amount was secured by several European countries and the US government. In June 2023, The Pentagon communicated that the Department of Defense signed a contract with SpaceX's Starlink to buy those satellite services for Ukraine.

The use of Starlink in Russian-occupied territories in Ukraine was however restricted by SpaceX, according to Ukrainian officials.

=== Russian Internet takeover in occupied territories ===
Public Internet access networks in occupied areas including Luhansk, Donetsk and Crimea have been taken over by Russian-backed providers including the Crimea-based Miranda Media. Access in the occupied territories is subject to Russian media restrictions and monitoring.

== See also ==
- Economy of Ukraine
- Telecommunications in Ukraine
