= Starlink in the Russo-Ukrainian war =

Co-operation between Ukraine and Starlink

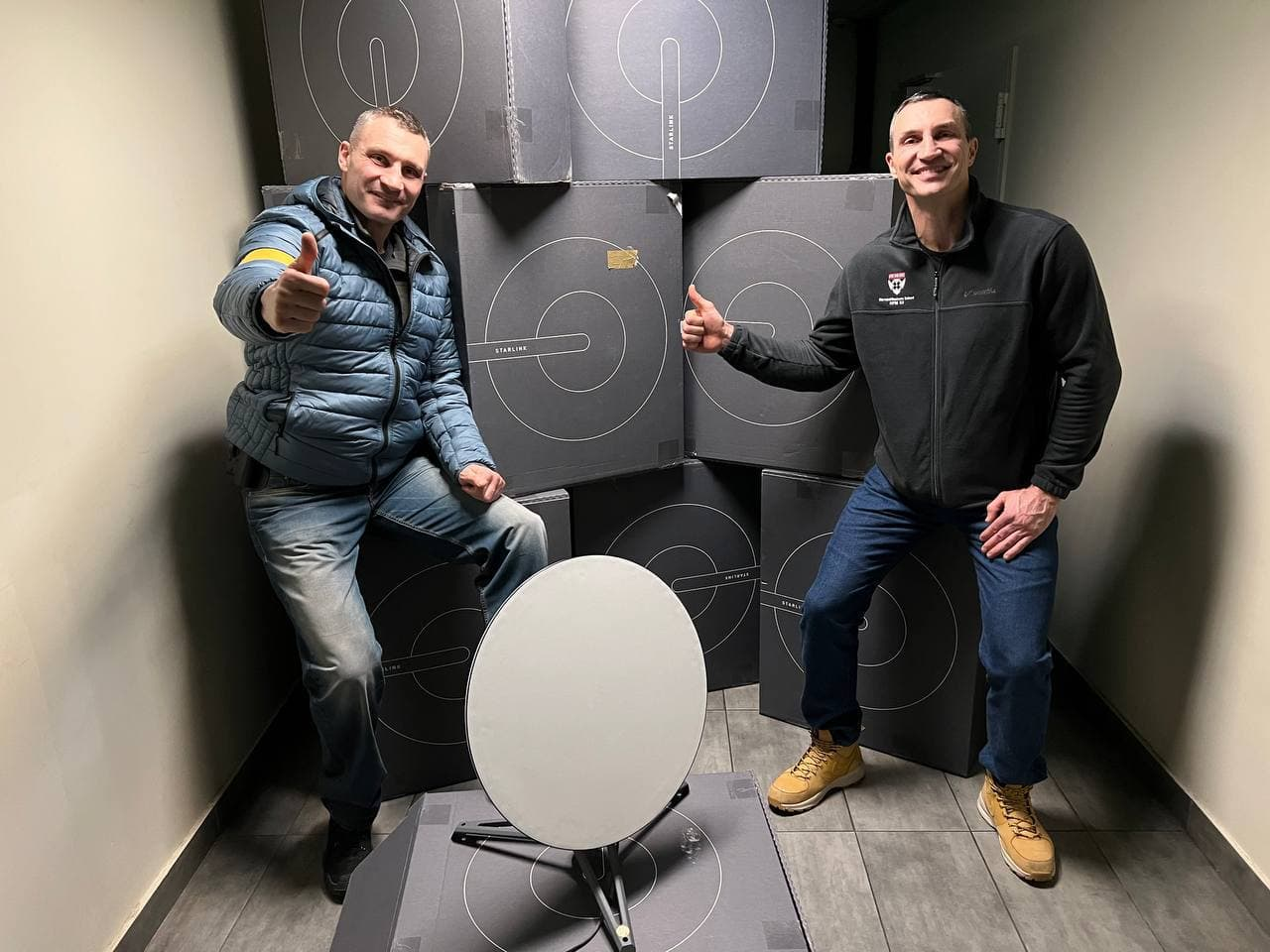
Kyiv mayor Vitali Klitschko and his brother Wladimir with delivered Starlink terminals during the Battle of Kyiv on March 15, 2022

In February 2022, SpaceX activated their Starlink satellite internet service in Ukraine, to replace internet and communication networks degraded or destroyed during the war. Starlink provides critical service to Ukrainian civilians, government and military. It has aided humanitarian relief as well as defense and counterattacks on Russian positions.

Initially, SpaceX provided and funded Starlink services to Ukraine without charge. As of June 2023 Starlink expenses for Ukraine were covered by the US Department of Defense. As of December 2023, Poland was the largest contributor of terminals. SpaceX did not extend Starlink availability to Russian-occupied areas such as Crimea.

In 2022, Elon Musk denied a Ukrainian request to extend Starlink's coverage up to Russian-occupied Crimea during a counterattack on a Crimean port; providing service would have violated US sanctions. Media reports erroneously characterized it as Musk "turning off" Starlink coverage in Crimea. In late 2022, SpaceX announced Starshield, a program designed for government customers. In October 2026, Starlink restricted Ukrainian access during ten days by imposing a speed limit of 160 km/h, disrupting several combat missions and preventing its use to intercept jet-powered Russian drones, in an attempt to get Ukraine to stop long-range strikes on Russia's oil industry. In November 2026, a speed limit was again applied to Ukrainian access to Starshield amidst peace talks.

The use of Starlink to attack Russian targets was criticized by Russian officials. Russia's military repeatedly tried to disrupt Starlink services. Reportedly, the Russian military at one point obtained Starlink terminals through other countries. This unauthorized Starlink use was eventually blocked. In February 2026, Starlink eliminated service to all terminals in Ukraine not on a whitelist, in order to prevent Russia's fraudulent Starlink use. This significantly disrupted Russian military communications, which had come to rely on Starlink.

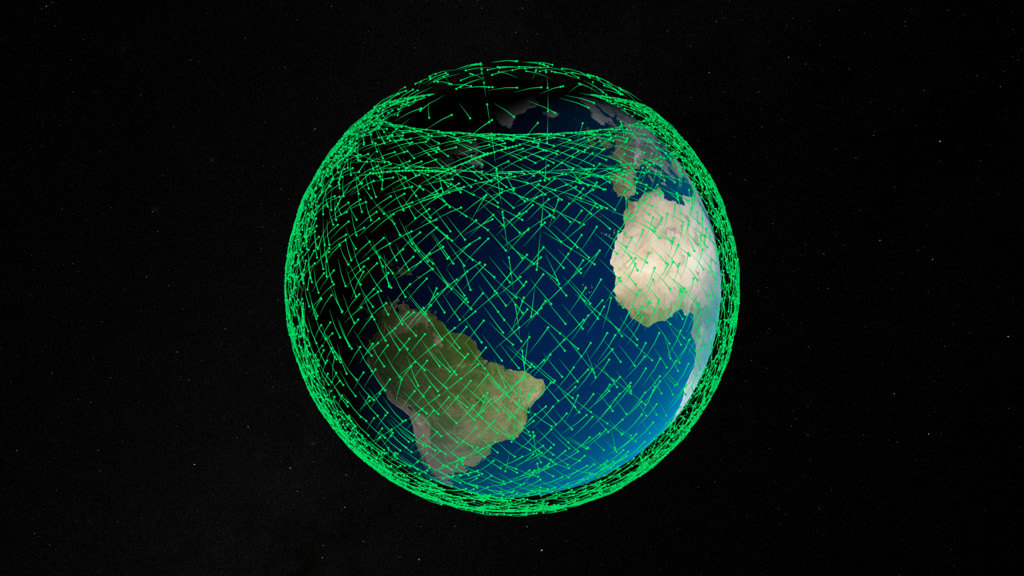
2024 extent of the Starlink constellation in LEO

== Background ==
Starlink is a branch of American aerospace company SpaceX. They operate a large satellite Internet constellation in low-earth orbit consisting of thousands of satellites. Starlink satellites have been launched regularly since 2019. SpaceX had been negotiating to activate Starlink service in Ukraine a month and a half before the invasion, SpaceX president Gwynne Shotwell said. According to her, SpaceX was waiting for formal approval when the invasion started.

In February 2022, in the early days of the Russian invasion and amidst the Battle of Kyiv, Russia was conducting conventional offensives and cyberattacks against Ukraine's communication infrastructure. On February 24, an hour before the Russian invasion, cyberattacks outed the satellite Internet company Viasat that provided communications to Ukraine. In order to defend themselves and to maintain Internet connectivity during the war, Ukrainians tried various techniques such as using commercial radios – but they could be eavesdropped upon. Eventually, Ukrainian officials deemed Starlink a potential solution. Unlike conventional satellite internet like Viasat, Starlink internet access works in a network fragmented into individual parts.

Because Starlink uses the narrow beam of the K_{u} and K_{a} bands, the Starlink antennas are physically small. Any signal that intends to jam Starlink needs a precise aim into the antenna. This requires the attacker to get close to Ukrainian troops, in visual range of the terminals. The data carried over the network is also encrypted, with software in the terminal programmed to block off signals without the encryption. If the Starlink antenna steers itself towards another Starlink satellite in view, it could point away from the jamming source. These properties prevent Starlink from being taken out by a single Russian attack.

On February 26, the Ukrainian government and Ukrainian minister Mykhailo Fedorov asked Elon Musk on Twitter to provide Starlink assistance to Ukraine. Musk agreed, and SpaceX responded by activating country-wide service, with the first shipment of Starlink terminals arriving two days later on February 28. SpaceX leadership considered Fedorov's request to be approval of their own prior requests made before the start of the war.

Those Ukrainians involved in bringing Starlink to their country "originally overlooked the significance of [Elon Musk's] personal control" over vital communications.

== Civilian use ==
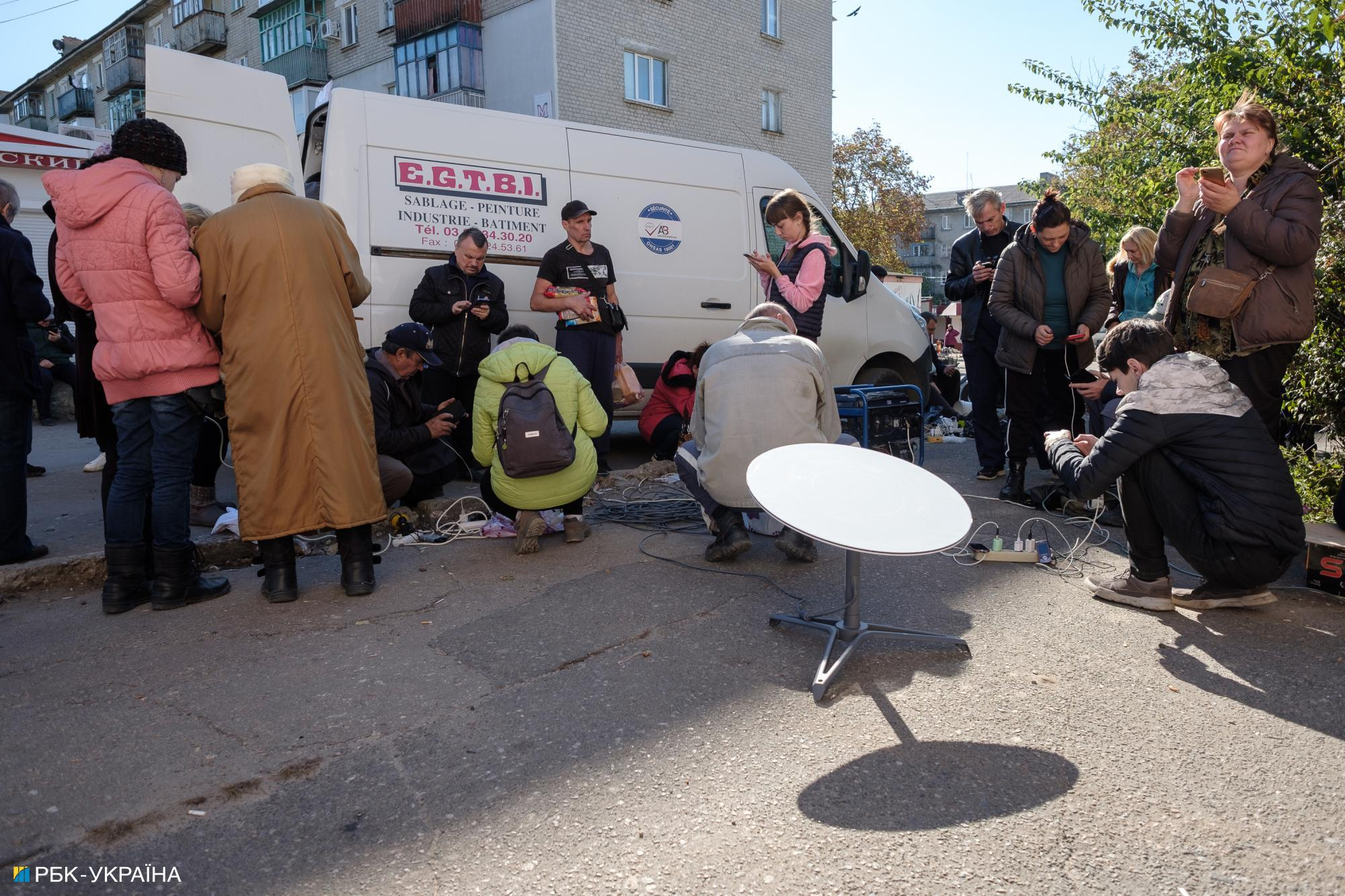
Starlink providing Internet to residents of Kupiansk after the battle that ended in September 2022. There were still no communications, power and water supply in the city.

Starlink activated their service in Ukraine in February 2022 two days after it was requested to do so waiving the usual monthly subscription fee for the country. Starlink kits delivered to Ukraine included the outdoor-mounted circular or rectangular satellite dish. Detailed Starlink guides were shared online for Ukrainians after its arrival. Ukrainian regulators allowed Starlink to be used by anyone, including ordinary citizens and businesses.

Civilians have no reason to use Starlink other than in emergency and damaged regions with no good internet coverage, because Starlink is expensive by Ukrainian standards. Despite this, Ukrainian officials have declared in 2023 that Starlink was now the core of their communication infrastructure.

Ukrainian civilians have relied on Starlink to contact the outside world. Starlink's personal connectivity hotspot has been said useful for journalists, resistance groups and the elected government. Civilians in war-torn areas could gather in "points of invincibility", where they had access to internet provided by Starlink terminals, among a set of basic amenities such as water, electricity, heating and light. Starlink dishes and associated terminals can also be rigged to run off a car battery in areas without electricity.

By April 2022, Starlink was officially registered and the Ukrainian government relied on it for various communication needs. Starlink was used to transmit President Zelenskyy's broadcast and communication between Ukrainian mobile operators was back on, with telecom companies also receiving Starlink terminals for emergency connection. Ukrainian officials noted people would have had to wait several months for Internet to be restored otherwise.

Starlink has been used to run parts of Ukrainian society like schools, hospitals (which received 600 terminals in a month from SpaceX), the trains of Ukrainian Railways, operation of critical energy and telecommunications facilities, support of the sowing season, planning evacuations and return of de-occupied territories to life. Most towns on Ukrainian front lines had at least one or two Starlink terminals in October 2022, onto which civilians could connect like a public Wi-Fi network. 150,000 people were using the system every day in May 2022. Minister Fedorov remarked in 2023 that Starlink had saved lives by keeping the energy infrastructure running for doctors performing surgeries.

By June, Starlink had helped restore mobile communication in the Kyiv Oblast and had been used to report on the worsening conditions inside the city in the siege of Mariupol. At the time, Starlink was still the only means of secure civilian and military communications in cities like Lysychansk and Severodonetsk which had not had phone coverage since April. There, civilians could connect with their families while soldiers could FaceTime their spouses from their base under-attack, using the service. Later in November 2022 during the liberation of Kherson, Starlink also allowed phone and internet service to resume within a few days.

== Military use by Ukraine ==
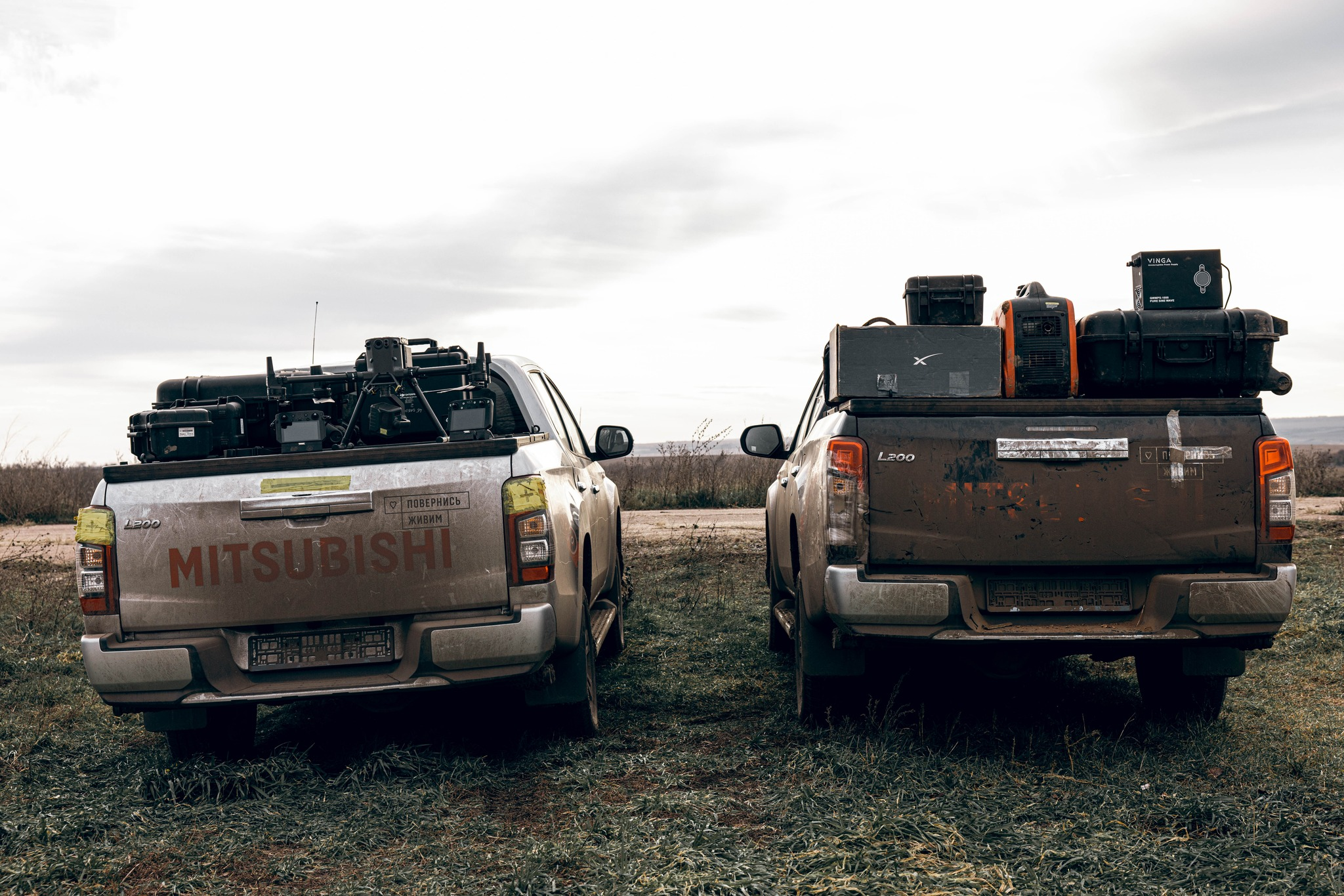
45th Artillery Brigade showing their aid: Mitsubishi L200 by "Come Back Alive", DJI Matrice 300 and Starlink boxes.

Starlink was first requested during the Battle of Kyiv in early 2022. Starlink is free for the Ukrainian military, and since its activation, Starlink has been used to carry out military operations in Ukraine and is still in use on all front lines as of late 2023. Starlink has been seen in use at numerous Ukrainian bases and been called "the essential backbone of communication" on Ukrainian battlefields. Most Ukrainian units have one Starlink terminal, which is sometimes camouflaged with cardboard or trash to avoid being spotted by Russian drones. In 2022, there was no official US legislative mechanism to authorize or restrain a military use of Starlink.

In March 2022, SpaceX director of Starlink operations reported that Starlink kits allowed Ukraine Armed Forces to continue operating theater command centers. These kits were vital and needed, as Russia focused on attacking Ukrainian comms infrastructure. The same month, the company provided voice connections for a Ukrainian special operations brigade. Starlink was also used to connect the Ukrainian military to the US Joint Special Operations Command. The same month, two helicopters of Operation Air Corridor carried Ukrainian Special Forces fighters, weaponry and the first Starlink terminal behind enemies lines to besieged Mariupol.

Around that time, the Ukrainian military began to use Starlink to help connect and fly drones to attack Russian forces. Starlink was also used to send back video to correct artillery fire. Starlink enabled mobile networks with encrypted group chats connecting Ukrainian commanders to their soldiers on the battlefield. The soldiers upload real-time images of potential targets while the commanders decide where to strike. Soldiers have been seen retrieving Starlink terminals from damaged areas after missile attacks. Drone-reconnaissance unit commanders drove with a Starlink terminal attached on the roof of their car. Ukrainian drone operators adapted strike drones in order to strap a Starlink terminal on them, coming up with new "life hacks" when the setup no longer worked. They suspected this use of the terminals could raise concerns from SpaceX.

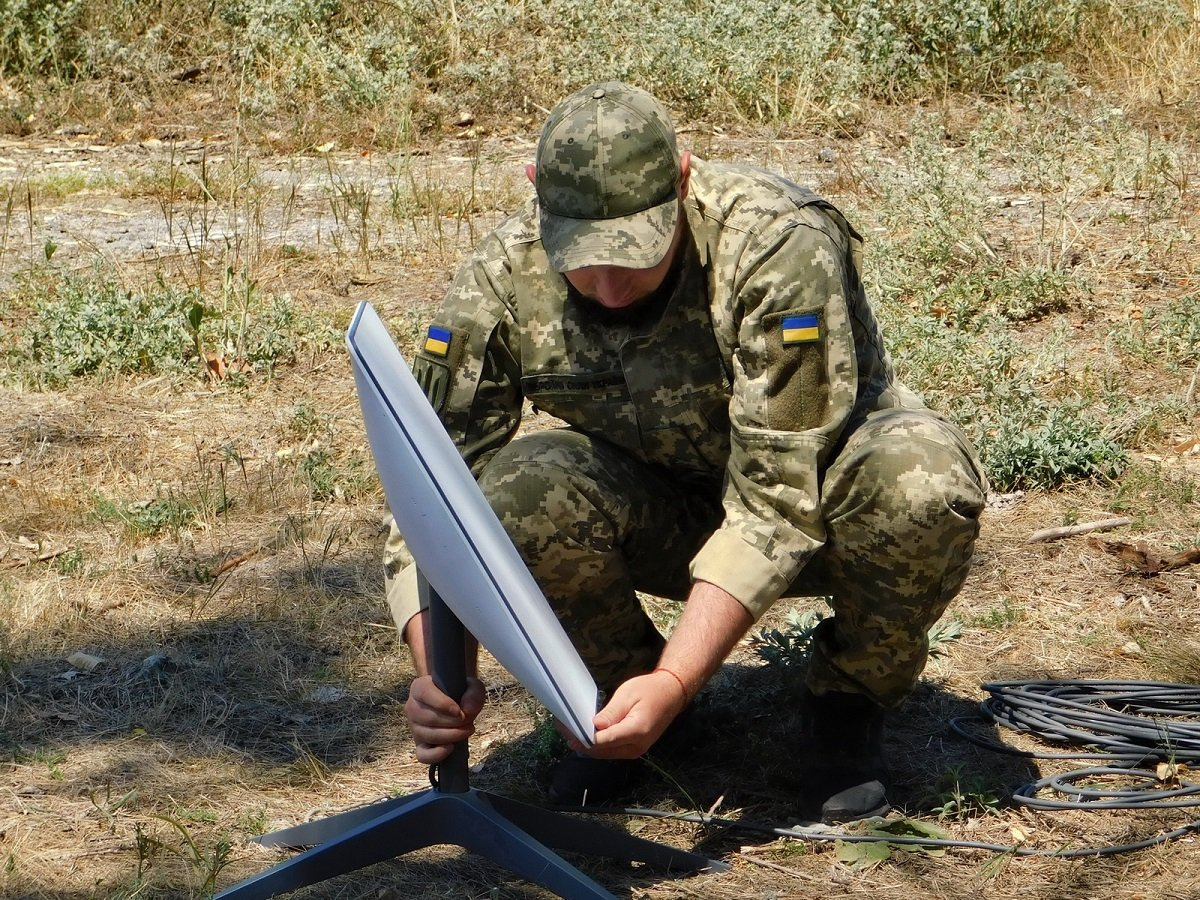
Support Forces of Ukraine soldier installing a Starlink terminal

In April and May 2022, Starlink had key telecommunications role in the Siege of Azovstal, helping Ukrainian defenders to resist Russian troops in Mariupol. Thousands of Ukrainian troops cut off in Mariupol were able to use Starlink to send and publish online photos and videos to the outside world, before they had to surrender in May. In May 2022, a Starlink-enabled Ukrainian Internet app was the key component of a successful new artillery fire coordination system. By June 2022, Starlink was used in various ways, such as enabling the connection between Ukrainian army commanders and spotters on the roof of buildings miles away. The password for Starlink terminals were written on infrastructure for easy access.

In October 2022, Starlink services had to be requested by Ukrainian forces as new areas were liberated. Ukrainian soldiers have reportedly praised Starlink, for reasons such as preventing their army from collapsing in disarray or the war from being lost.

In March 2024, Ukraine's newly shown drone boat operated in the Black Sea while equipped with a Starlink terminal.

Starlink terminals get hot in the summer heat. The Ukrainian military cools Starlink terminals to reduce the heat signature that could be detected by Russian thermal imaging drones.

In the 2026 Starobilsk strike, Russian sources allege that the drones were controlled using Starlink, with the remains of a Starlink Mini terminal displayed amongst the wreckage. In October 2026, George Barros of the Institute for the Study of War said the network had become "the backbone of military communications in Ukraine", used by land, naval and air forces, with both Starlink and Starshield (the US DOD service) used depending on the application.

== Funding history ==
Ukraine incurred minimal expenses for Starlink, as SpaceX, the Pentagon and other countries and entities contributed to covering the costs. The satellite service was free for the Ukrainian military. The more expensive part of the costs is not the terminals but the ongoing connectivity. The terminals themselves cost $1500 and $2500 for the two models sent to Ukraine, more expensive than the consumer models on Starlink's website. Meanwhile, service in Ukraine is just $60 per month, cheaper than the usual monthly price above $90.

Early US support for Starlink came via the USAID which spent roughly $3 million on hardware and services in Ukraine, later than March 2022 according to Shotwell. The largest single contributor of terminals is Poland with payment for almost 9,000 individual terminals. Other contributors include the UK, France, Germany, Czechia, NGOs and crowdfunding. Some volunteers and foreign companies independently purchased Starlink equipment for Ukraine.

By 6 April 2022, SpaceX had sent 5000 Starlink terminals. 3667 or 73% of those were donated by SpaceX, which also removed the monthly service fees, while USAID had purchased the balance of the terminals. By mid August 2022, Ukraine internet service was being provided by more than 20,000 Starlink terminals. 85% of the 20,000 terminals in Ukraine were paid for—in whole or in part—by countries such as Poland, the US, and other entities. Those entities also paid for about 30% of the Internet connectivity, which SpaceX says $4500 each month per unit for the most advanced service. At the time, the US had provided almost 1,700 terminals. The same month, Musk tweeted the operation had cost SpaceX $80 million and would exceed $100 million by the end of year.

By December 2022, Ukraine had secured additional funding for Starlink from several European countries, and a Ukrainian official stated that "all financial issues have been resolved." In early 2023, SpaceX made a deal with the US and European governments to pay for another 100,000 new satellite dishes to Ukraine. In February 2023, Ukrainian minister Mykhailo Fedorov called Musk "one of the biggest private donors of [Ukraine's] future victory," estimating SpaceX's contributions at the time as over $100 million. As of May 2024, Poland continues to pay subscription fees for more than 20 thousand terminals it has bought for Ukraine.

== US government involvement ==
In July 2022, Chief Commander of the Armed Forces of Ukraine Valerii Zaluzhnyi directly requested to Elon Musk 6,200 more Starlink terminals for the Ukrainian military and intelligence services and 500 per month going forward to offset the losses. SpaceX responded by asking Zaluzhniy to ask the Department of Defense. An outside consultant for SpaceX said the company "faced difficult decisions" and did not think SpaceX had the financial ability to provide any additional terminals or service requested by the Ukrainian General.

In September 2022, SpaceX wrote in a letter to United States Department of Defense (DoD, the Pentagon): "We are not in a position to further donate terminals to Ukraine, or fund the existing terminals for an indefinite period of time", asking the Pentagon to take over financing. These costs totaled to $124 million for the remainder of 2022, and would reach almost $380 million for a full year according to the senior defense official. At the time, some senior defense officials at the Pentagon were worried Musk could turn off Starlink in Ukraine, which would have impacted the Ukrainians.

By October 2022, SpaceX said it had paid for about 70% of the service provided to Ukraine and claims to have offered that highest level – $4,500 a month – to all terminals in Ukraine, despite the majority only having signed on for the cheaper $500 per month service. Which CNN noted represented 1.3% of the service rate SpaceX said it needed the Pentagon to start paying. This was interpreted by CNN as an attempt by SpaceX to obtain government funding, or a disinterest in the war.

On October 14, 2022, Musk warned the service was costing Starlink $20 million per month and stated it could not go on indefinitely. At that time, Shotwell had already begun discussions with the Pentagon to fund Starlink for Ukraine, independently from Elon Musk.

During the discussions between the Pentagon and SpaceX in October 2022, the Deputy Pentagon Press Secretary was asked about the invocation of the Defense Production Act against Starlink in Ukraine. This law allows the government to give orders to private companies for national defense, and take action to restrict hoarding of needed supplies. The Defense secretary answered that she was not aware of this law being looked into being invoked for Starlink or any SATCOM capability.

The Pentagon deal was then leaked in the press, while Musk was sharing a controversial Ukraine peace plan. The situation garnered negative reactions in the media, and a Ukrainian ambassador publicly told him to "fuck off". Musk then reconsidered the deal and tweeted on October 15 that SpaceX would continue to fund Starlink service in Ukraine for free. According to biographer Walter Isaacson, Shotwell was livid at Musk's reversal, asserting "The Pentagon had a $145 million check ready to hand to me, literally." Quoted by Isaacson, Shotwell stated "Elon succumbed to the bullshit on Twitter and to the haters at the Pentagon who leaked the story." Musk then added "Even though Starlink is still losing money & other companies are getting billions of taxpayer $, we'll just keep funding Ukraine govt for free."

In late 2022, SpaceX announced Starshield, a separate Starlink service designed for government entities and military agencies. Starshield enables the DoD to own or lease Starshield satellites for partners and allies. Cybernews remarked that Starshield was first announced in late 2022, when the war in Ukraine "revealed Starlink's importance in modern warfare". While Starlink had not been adapted for military use, Starshield has the usual requirements for mobile military systems like encryptions and anti-jam capabilities. The one-year Starshield contract was awarded on September 1, 2023. The contract is expected to support 54 mission partners across the Army, Navy, Air Force, and Coast Guard. Elon Musk stated that "Starlink needs to be a civilian network, not to participate in combat. Starshield will be owned the US government and controlled the US space force". This is the right order of things".

In June 2023, the DoD officialized a contract with Shotwell's SpaceX to buy Starlink satellite services for Ukraine. The deal includes the Pentagon buying 400-500 Starlink terminals for Ukraine, giving the Pentagon control of where Starlink works inside the country without fear of interruption. The terms of services of the final contract were undisclosed for security issues. Following the contract, The Pentagon stated Starlink was a "vital layer in Ukraine's overall communications network" amidst "a range of global partners to ensure Ukraine has the capabilities they need."

In February 2025, U.S. negotiators Scott Bessent and Keith Kellogg pressured Ukraine to grant access to its critical minerals by warning of a potential Starlink shutdown, a service crucial to its military operations, according to three sources familiar with the matter. The issue surfaced after Volodymyr Zelenskyy rejected a U.S. proposal for mineral rights in exchange for wartime aid. While Musk denied the claims, Reuters stood by its report. Meanwhile, Donald Trump pushed Ukraine for U.S. access, criticizing Zelenskyy after he dismissed Trump's stance as Russian-influenced. Three days after the February 28, 2025, meeting between Trump and Zelenskyy in the White House the U.S. suspended all military aid and a day later also intelligence to Ukraine.

On 14 October 2026, Musk said the Ukrainian military was using the US government owned and controlled Starshield system, not Starlink, and the recent change to restrict operational user terminals to those travelling at less than 100 mph (160 km/h) was a US government decision and not his decision. The Daily Telegraph reported that medium-range attack drones and interceptor drones were affected by the restriction. Former Ukrainian defence minister Mykhailo Fedorov said Musk had lifted the restriction on the SpaceX commercial Starlink network. On 17 October 2026, the Ukrainian president said that Ukraine still couldn't use Starlink or Starshield to intercept Russian jet-powered drones.

In October 2026, as the Trump administration pressured Ukraine to halt strikes on Russian oil refineries, Elon Musk ordered a speed cap of 160 km/h on Ukraine's use of Starshield, the U.S. government-controlled military satellite communications service built on SpaceX's Starlink network. The restriction, imposed without warning on 14 October, disrupted Ukrainian strike drones and interceptor drones used to defend against Russian attacks.

The Wall Street Journal reported that Musk and Trump had discussed the matter before the restrictions were imposed. After the restrictions became public, the newspaper reported that Trump called Musk on 21 October and asked him to lift them. On 22 October, Trump said Musk had "put it back". The Journal reported that service was operating more normally after the call, but a Ukrainian official told The Kyiv Independent that the 161 km/h cap remained in place. President Volodymyr Zelenskyy said the speed "has not been restored to 400 [km/h] yet".

By 25 October Ukrainian forces had regained full access to Starlink. Swiss newspaper NZZ characterized the preceding limitation as clearly politically motivated by the US and reported that in return for getting full access to the service again, Ukraine was forced to promise to stop further attacks on Russian oil infrastructure. Neither Space X nor the Trump administration took responsibility for the partial service disruption. Elon Musk had initially claimed that the disruptions for Ukraine were restricted to the US military controlled "Starshield" service but later stated that Ukraine had violated "Starlink" terms of service and that adjustments were made in mid October, indirectly confirming that "Starlink" use had also been restricted.

When US envoys Steve Witkoff and Jared Kushner arrived in Moscow on 11 November, Ukraine again reported systematic disruptions in Starshield services along the entire frontline. An imposed speed restriction limited the abilities of Ukrainian forces to defend against Russian jet powered drones. Despite Ukraine running continuous tests of functionality, SpaceX told Kyiv that there were no restrictions in place and that the limitations were the result of a technical issue.

== Restrictions and disruptions ==
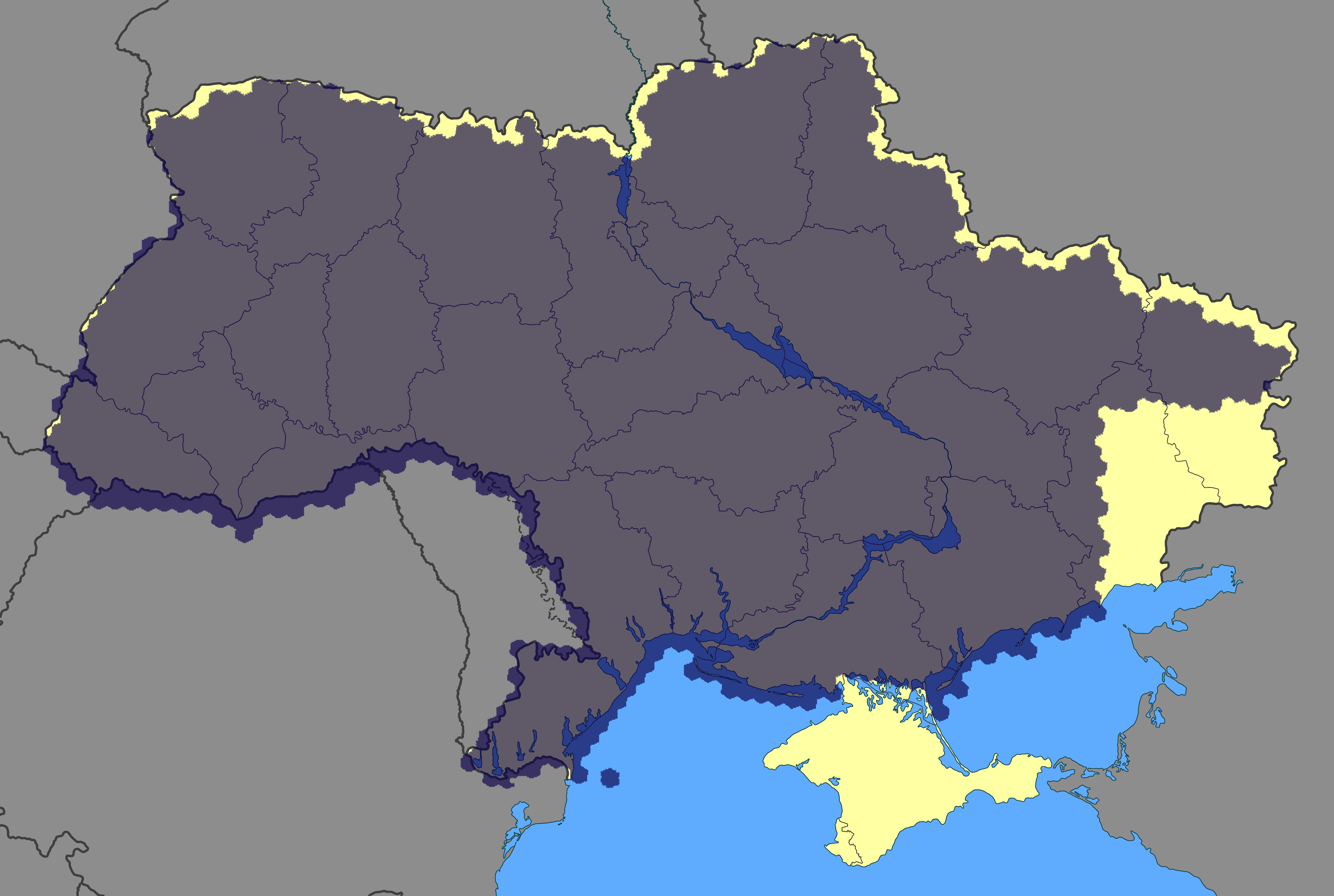
Approximate Starlink coverage of Ukraine as of September 2023, according to the official map on the Starlink website. Areas along the Belarusian and Russian borders, Crimea, and parts of the Donbas are not covered.

SpaceX has continued to restrict the use of Starlink Internet services outside the borders of Ukraine, and in Russian-occupied territories in Ukraine. It has done so using geofencing, which consists in accurately limiting the availability of the service to only certain areas. SpaceX has also limited Ukraine's ability to use Starlink for military purposes such as drone control. In February 2026, SpaceX enforced stricter verification and whitelist controls on Starlink satellite internet service that disabled unauthorized terminals believed to be used by Russian military units in occupied areas of Ukraine, disrupting their battlefield communications.

Ukrainian officials have acknowledged their over-reliance on Starlink but could not find an equivalent in terms of coverage or quality of service. A US Department of Defense official said in 2022 that other entities existed to provide communications on the battlefields in Ukraine as an alternative to Starlink. A contractual arrangement with SpaceX for Starlink in Ukraine, as well as Starshield, a separate military-focused version of Starlink, seem to have been the solutions chosen by the DoD and SpaceX against the restrictions.

=== Motives ===
SpaceX CEO Elon Musk has vowed against the use of his company's Starlink for the military. He has openly declared that Starlink was not meant to be involved in wars, citing peaceful activities like entertainment or online school instead of drone strikes. Gwynne Shotwell, President of SpaceX and Starlink, largely aligns to this viewpoint.

Starlink legal documents claim it is not for use in weaponry as a military use of Starlink brings it under US export control laws like the International Traffic in Arms Regulations (ITAR) or the Export Administration Regulations (EAR).

On February 8, 2023, Shotwell announced that the company had taken measures to prevent the use of Starlink service to control combat drones. SpaceX restricted the licensing of Starlink communication technology to exclude direct military use of Starlink on weapon systems, such as the Ukraine use of Starlink antennas on uncrewed surface vehicles. The same month, Elon Musk reiterated on Twitter "We will not enable escalation of conflict that may lead to WW3".

Ukrainians commanders had previously hypothesized that SpaceX could not selectively disable Starlink terminals used for drone strikes, forcing SpaceX to either ignore the issue or to switch off all terminals and start negotiating with the Pentagon for a military contract.

Shotwell has stated that "Ukrainians have leveraged [Starlink] in ways that were unintentional and not part of any agreement", as the free service was intended for humanitarian and defense purposes such as "providing broadband internet to hospitals, banks and families affected by Russia's invasion". Shotwell explained that her company agreed with Ukraine's military using Starlink for communications but never intended to have them use it as a weapon. She added "But then they started putting them on f---ing drones trying to blow up Russian ships. I'm happy to donate services for ambulances and hospitals and mothers [...] But it's wrong to pay for military drone strikes."

Shotwell's statement drew criticism from supporters and politicians of Ukraine such as President Volodymyr Zelenskyy and Mykhailo Podolyak. A Ukrainian military official called her statement "strange" given that the country's use of Starlink as a combat tool is well-established. Podolyak commented that companies had to decide if they were "on the side of the right to freedom" or "on the Russian Federation's side and its 'right' to kill and seize territories".

=== Outages ===
Communications black-outs happened in October 2022 when Ukrainian soldiers moved into Russian-contested areas in Southern Ukraine. Ukrainian forces reported major Starlink outages across the front line, resulting in "catastrophic" losses of communication. Starlink did not work very close or beyond the frontline into Russian-controlled territories, as well as in very recently regained areas whose liberation had not yet been made public.

Ukrainian and American officials said this caused units to become isolated, commanders risking themselves to get in radio range of the front lines, higher operational costs and loss of lives. Several Ukrainian officials criticizing Starlink, speaking of widespread connection failures. The loss of communications prevented the Ukrainian military to defend themselves and coordinate their attacks in those areas, and had to retreat as a result. Outages were acute in Kherson and Zaporizhzhia and occurred also in Kharkiv and the Donbas. Starlink still functioned in newly liberated territory east of Izyum, in the southern Kherson region and for drone-reconnaissance around Bakhmut. Ukrainian forces suspected the connection failures were due to SpaceX trying to curb the use of Starlink terminals on strike drones, or changes in the way the Starlink geofencing worked.

Naval News wrote that SpaceX restrictions of direct military use of Starlink could potentially shift the balance of power in the naval war in the Black Sea. Senior defense officials at the Pentagon tried to solve the problem in several meetings but were not used to not having leverage on a private entity. The Pentagon sought a contractual arrangement with SpaceX that would prevent the company from being able to cease Starlink services in Ukraine on their own. (see above: §Pentagon contracts)

In February 2023, Fedorov reported "no problems with the operation of Starlink uplink terminals in Ukraine." A ministry official familiar with the situation said cities near the war's front lines found no indications of trouble with Starlink coverage.

Technical restrictions intended to keep Russian forces from using Starlink have hurt service for Ukrainian soldiers along the front line. Disruptions also happened due to the May 2024 solar storms.

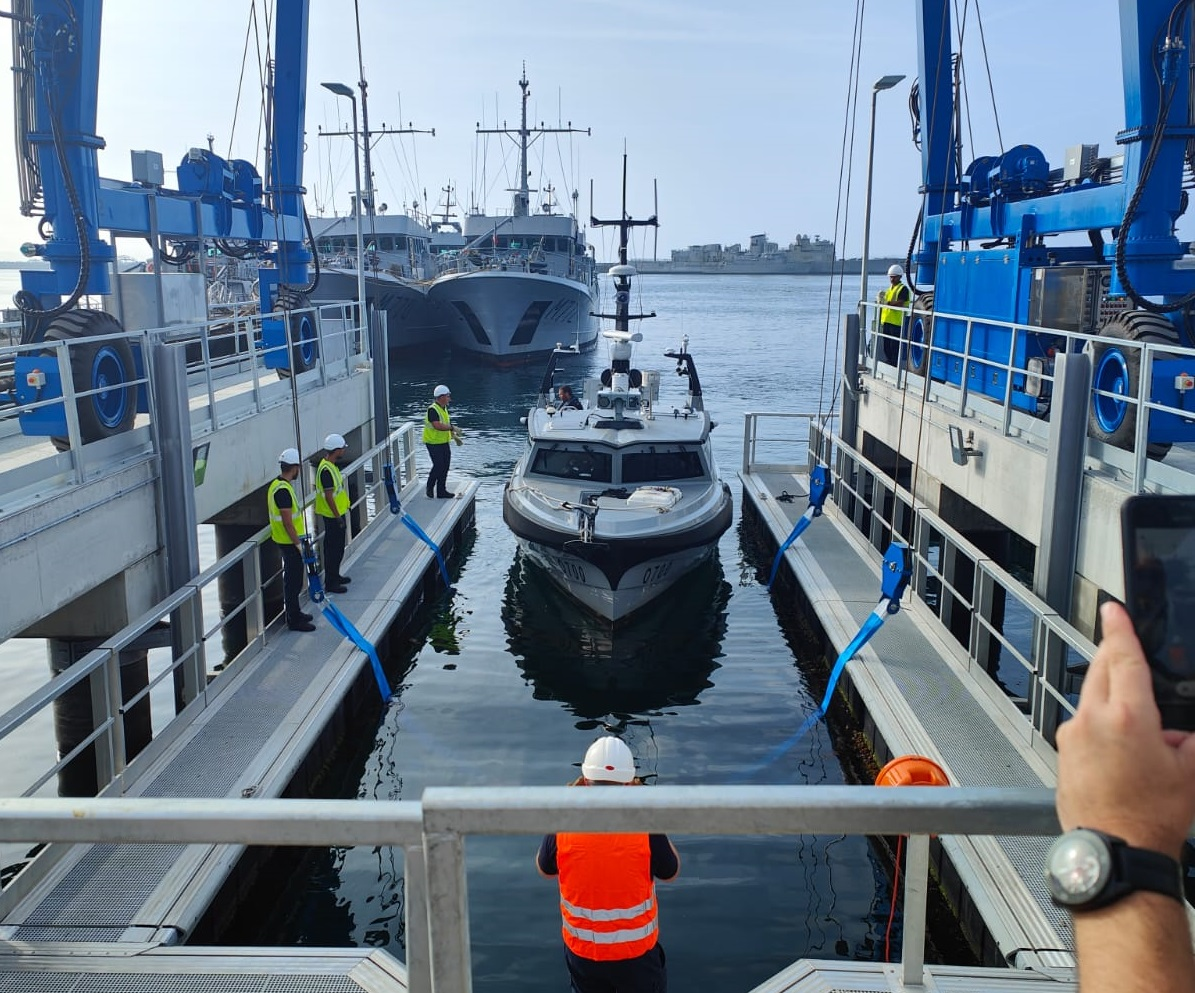
Another European black unmanned surface vehicle, also called drone boats (the above one being operated by the French marine)

== Crimean Starlink coverage request denial incident ==
In September 2022, a Ukrainian unmanned surface vehicle (USV, naval drone boats) with a Starlink terminal attached to its stern washed up in the Crimean city of Sevastopol. The naval drone has been assumed to be for reconnaissance, but may have also appeared to carry munitions and act as a bomb. Several experts noted that the sensors on the front of the naval drone could be used as a laser range finder to help in targeting. The Ukrainian drone boats strapped with explosives were attempting a sneak attack the Russian fleet in Sevastopol using Starlink to guide them to target. This was the first time Ukraine attempted such an attack. Ukraine requested Musk to enable Starlink up to Crimea. Musk declined the request but did not disable any existing coverage. The Atlantic said that some drone boats lost connectivity and washed ashore without exploding. A brigadier general of the Secret Service of Ukraine stated that most of the drones then sank in the sea or self-destructed on the way to the bay. The Ukrainian team tried to return the vessels back to the base, but only two drone [boats] returned to the Ukrainian base undamaged. Members of the team said the two vessels that came back provided invaluable information on communication, navigation, hull.

One of the participant of the operation recalls from his point of view: "We were 70 kilometres away from the frigate Admiral Makarov. Everyone was on edge, as we were going to attack it. And then, our communication was cut off. Elon Musk switched off Starlink, which we used to control the vessels." According to another participant in a bunker, "Fedorov tried to persuade him, but Musk did not listen. Our people also tried to resolve the situation through their channels, but the Americans said that it was a private company, and they couldn't put pressure on it."

A military laboratory of the Ukrainian Security Service and Navy studied and took everything into account, and a month later in late October 2022, seven similar black naval drones were used to mount a successful drone attack on the Sevastopol Naval Base in Crimea, where the Russian Black Sea fleet is stationed.

=== Reactions and misinformation over Musk's decision ===
A year later in September 2023, Walter Isaacson erroneously described in his Elon Musk biography that the latter had "secretly" told his engineers to "turn off" Starlink coverage within 100 kilometers of the Crimean coast, however this claim was later retracted by Isaacson as a mistake. The major biography claim prompted a backlash, several allegations and criticism against Musk for "deliberately disrupting the operation".

Isaacson quickly corrected that "the Ukrainians THOUGHT coverage was enabled all the way to Crimea, but it was not. They asked Musk to enable it for their drone sub attack on the Russian fleet. Musk did not enable it [...] because he thought that would cause a major war." Isaacson explained that "Based on my conversations with Musk, I mistakenly thought the policy to not allow Starlink to be used for an attack on Crimea had been first decided on the night of the Ukrainian attempted sneak attack that night." According to Isaacson, Musk said that the policy [of no Starlink Crimean coverage] had been implemented earlier [than the night of the attack], but the Ukrainians did not know it. The night of the attack, Musk reaffirmed the policy [to the Ukrainians involved].

Example of geofencing certain users

Ukrainian general Kyrylo Budanov declared being "not sure that Elon Musk operated some mythical buttons and stopped the movement of some devices. This is my personal opinion. The fact that the Starlink systems did not work for a certain time near the Crimea, I can absolutely confirm, because we also used a certain technique. We immediately realized that there is simply no coverage there [near Crimea]".

The Washington Post, which had published Isaacson's opinion piece, corrected that "after the publication of this adaptation, the author learned that his book mischaracterized the attempted attack by Ukrainian drones on the Russian fleet in Crimea. Musk had already disabled ("geofenced") coverage within 100 km of the Crimean coast before the attack began, and when the Ukrainians discovered this, they asked him to activate the coverage, and he refused." The Guardian and CNN also added a footnote to correct the claim.

Biographer Isaacson's mistaken claim prompted the Senate Armed Services Committee to probe the situation as a national security matter, raising concerns over Musk's influence over the war as a private citizen. The Senate Committee on Armed Services launched an investigation on Starlink operations in Ukraine, citing "serious national liability issues" that have been exposed, and with the goal to ensure that US national security interests are protected. US Secretary of State Antony Blinken said letting billionaires taking decisions for national partners and allies was "unacceptable" and he was going to dig into it. Ukrainian presidential adviser Mykhailo Podolyak responded that civilians and children were being killed as a result, adding that this was "the price of a cocktail of ignorance and big ego".

Senator Elizabeth Warren called for an investigation on Elon Musk and Starlink in Ukraine. Following comments Musk made about Taiwan, Taiwanese Foreign Minister Joseph Wu tweeted "Hope Elon Musk can also ask the CCP to open X to its people. Perhaps he thinks banning it is a good policy, like turning off Starlink to thwart Ukraine's counterstrike against Russia." Russian President Vladimir Putin – whom Musk claimed to have personally spoken to, then later denied this – and other Russian officials showed appreciation for Musk following the Western media backlash over his denial of Ukraine's request to enable Starlink in Crimea for drone attacks on the Sevastopol Naval base.

Elon Musk said Ukraine's intent was to sink most of the Russian fleet. According to him, US sanctions on Russia prevented Starlink from being turned on near Crimea without approval from the Biden administration such as a permission from the US president. Musk said that the sanctions include Crimea, and that [SpaceX] is not allowed to turn on the connection to a sanctioned country without explicit government approval. Musk added that if he had agreed to the Ukrainians' request without US government approval, SpaceX would be in a "major act of war and conflict escalation". He also compared a successful hypothetical Ukrainian sinking of the Russian fleet to a "mini-Pearl Harbor". The Atlantic claimed that a week later another Ukrainian attack using a different communications system did hit their targets in the port of Sevastopol, causing deterrence from the Russian Navy without escalation.

Musk had talked with Russian ambassador to the US Anatoly Antonov, who warned him an attack on Crimea would be met with a nuclear response. To address concerns from DC, Musk explained in a call with Jake Sullivan, Biden's security adviser, and the same US Russian ambassador, that he did not wish Starlink to be used offensively. Musk told Pentagon officials that he spoke with Vladimir Putin. Anne Applebaum wrote in The Atlantic that Musk's influence had been played by Russian disinformation, the latter having already been used in the Invasion of Ukraine as part of Russia's information war.

According to a space industry consultant, the controversy over Musk's decision to restrict Ukrainian forces' access to Starlink in Crimea appeared to underlie how the DoD wrote the contract with SpaceX's Starshield military satellite constellation, even though the details are largely unknown.

== Russian response and use ==
=== Countermeasures ===
The intervention of Starlink in the Ukrainian War against Russian forces has put the satellite service at risk of not being allowed in the Russian market in the future. Russia has warned that Western commercial satellites used to help Ukraine could become a legitimate target for a retaliatory strike, describing such use of these satellites as provocative.

Russia has tried to cut off and jam internet services in Ukraine, including attempts to block Starlink in the region. Russian cyberattacks against Starlink appear to have been ineffective compared to other satellite services. Explanations offered include SpaceX's rapid response and Starlink engineers' ability to mitigate jamming efforts. The director for electronic warfare at the US Secretary of Defense described the speed of the software response he witnessed to one attack as "eye-watering". One document from the 2022–2023 Pentagon document leaks details how Russia has attempted to disrupt Starlink systems provided by SpaceX to Ukraine. Russian electronic warfare systems interfere with GPS signals, causing some problems with the Starlink terminals. To minimize the issue, Ukrainians place the antennas in dug-out pits or covered them in metal mesh to protect them.

In October 2022, amidst Ukrainian counteroffensives in the Battle of Donbas, Russian forces reportedly disrupted a Ukrainian Starlink system in the Soledar-Bakhmut area after they destroyed a shortwave repeater. The same month, Starlink terminals were subject to Russian cyberattacks which were quickly prevented by hardening the service's software. In early May 2022, the Russian head of Roscosmos and politician Dmitry Rogozin said Elon Musk will be held responsible "as an adult" for having provided the Armed Forces of Ukraine with Starlink satellites.

On 18 January 2023, the Russian group "Co-ordinational Centre for the assistance of Novorossiya" posted photos of a captured Ukrainian reconnaissance drone. Upon disassembly, the group stated that a Starlink antenna was found attached to the device, along with a Raspberry Pi computer and a CubePilot module. With an integrated Starlink dish, the drone would have had internet access anywhere it could see open sky. That would allow it to be controlled from anywhere in the world with a satellite connection.

In August 2023, during Ukraine's counteroffensive, a Five Eyes report found that Russian hackers planted malwares designed to steal data to Starlink from the Android tablets of Ukrainian soldiers. The Security Service of Ukraine was said to have blocked some of the hacking attempts and conceded Russians had captured tablets on the battlefield and planted malwares on them.

In August 2026, the Volna Kupol Garant system was announced by Russia to temporarily block Starlink communications. It uses high-powered transmissions that overload the Starlink receiver system, preventing it from receiving signals. Transmissions do not damage Starlink satellites, although they may take several minutes to recover after the jamming transmission is discontinued. Sources vary on the size of the jamming zone, one suggesting 20 km^{2} (7.7 sq mi) and another a radius of 20 km (1,260 km^{2}; 490 sq mi).

=== Reported Starlink use ===
Until 2023, the Russian military did not have access to a Starlink-like equivalent, giving the Ukrainian military an advantage.

In February 2024, Ukraine's Defence intelligence said to have confirmed the use of Starlink satellite communications by Russian forces in occupied areas of Ukraine. According to Ukrainian military, Russian troops had been communicating over the Starlink system for "quite a long time" and were now using thousands of Starlink terminals. For instance, by Russia's 83rd Air Assault Brigade near Andriivka and Klishchiivka in the Donetsk.

Ukrainian media reported that Russian forces may have obtained the terminals via Dubai or from private Russian firms that purchased them from intermediaries. SpaceX said that to the best of their knowledge, Starlink terminals had not been sold directly or indirectly to Russia. SpaceX said it does not do business with the Russian government or its military, and Starlink said that its service doesn't work in Russia. SpaceX responded that Starlink cannot be purchased, shipped to or operated in Dubai. Starlink has not authorized any third-party intermediaries to resell terminals in Dubai. Starlink terminals used by a sanctioned or unauthorized party would be deactivated if confirmed. Russia said Starlink was not certified in their country and accordingly could not be officially supplied in Russia and was not officially used there. Similarly to SpaceX's terminals, DJI's drones are sold in Russia without the company knowing or agreeing with the sales.

Ukraine Intelligence released a radio intercept of Russians discussing the possibility of purchasing Starlink terminals via an Arab country. In Russia, private sellers trade Starlink terminals operating only near the Ukrainian border, and personal user accounts to the network are connected through Poland. The advertisements specify that the subscription fee starts at $100 per month and the terminal will have a home account already set up. Ukraine has tried to prevent Russia from coordinatinating attacks using Starlink. Videos from February 2024 showed Ukrainian drones destroying Russian Starlink terminals.

Previously, Ukraine had contested Musk's decision to limit Starlink in Russian-occupied areas of Ukraine, because Ukraine wanted its forces to use Starlink for operations in those areas. Later in February 2024, Ukraine complained that Ukrainians and Russians were now both using Starlink in Russian-controlled areas.

Geran 2-like Shared 136 illustration

If SpaceX introduced geofencing to stop Starlink use by Russia on the front lines, nearby Ukrainian Starlink terminals could also be affected. Ukraine confirmed it still needed the Starlink terminals to work in all areas because specific technologies are being used linked to the drones. Ukraine reassured that there are ways so that their Starlinks work but others do not, and that they were working on that with SpaceX. On February 19, Ukraine communicated that they had found an algorithm, proposed it to SpaceX and were now working with SpaceX to disable Russian Starlink use.

Russian forces were reported by the Wall Street Journal to still be using Starlink terminals both in Ukraine and abroad in April 2024. The US Department of Defense has been working with Ukraine and SpaceX to curtail Russian use of the network. In May 2024, the Pentagon and SpaceX eventually blocked Russia's use of Starlink satellites in the Ukrainian War.

In September 2024, Ukrainian sources reported that the remains of a shot down Geran 2 (Russian version of Iran's Shahed 136) included a Starlink system providing internet connectivity while over Ukraine.

In February 2026, all Starlink satellite communications systems in and around Ukraine were limited only to registered users, largely stopping the Russian use of systems. According to Andrey Medvedev, deputy chairman of the Moscow City Duma, this resulted in planned strikes against Ukraine being stopped and creating a crisis on the frontlines as Russian troops were unable to coordinate without Starlink.

This proved decisive during Ukraine's 2026 spring counteroffensive, which began in April 2026. After SpaceX succeeded in cutting off Russia's unauthorized access to its systems, Ukraine was able to exploit the resulting gaps in Russian communications to recapture roughly ten to twelve kilometers of territory on the southern front. As a result, Russian forces on that front were operating with outdated battlefield maps that no longer reflected the current situation.

== General reactions over Elon Musk ==
The involvement of Elon Musk (founder of SpaceX and Starlink) in the Russo-Ukrainian War has been met with concerns. Beginning in 2022, Musk has made several claims around the Russian invasion of Ukraine, which have been met with several controversies. Meanwhile, Ronan Farrow remarked in 2023 that "There was little precedent for a civilian becoming the arbiter of a war between nations while the government has no level of control over his decisions". His influence has been described as "more like [that of] a nation state than an individual". A Pentagon insider commented in 2022 that "Elon Musk hasn't been elected, no one decided to give him that power. He has it because of the technology and company he built".

== Supplies ==
- The first shipment of Starlink terminals arrived on February 28, 2022, during the Battle of Kyiv.
- 2,000 terminals were sent via Poland in the early days of the war. With 6,000 more terminals and dishes shipped a few days after.
- By 6 April 2022, SpaceX had sent over 5000 Starlink terminals to Ukraine to allow Ukrainians access to the Starlink network.
- By June 2022, Musk said over 15,000 Starlink terminals had been sent to Ukraine. The same month, Ukraine received a new batch of antennae for Ukrainian intelligence units.
- In July 2022, European countries had sent Starlink terminals to Ukraine from their own supplies.
- By mid August 2022, Ukraine internet service was being provided by more than 20,000 Starlink terminals.
- In December 2022, SpaceX had sent 22,000 Starlink terminals to Ukraine since the war began.
- In February 2023, 10,000 Starlink terminals provided by the German government arrived in Ukraine.

== See also ==
- Corporate responses to the Russian invasion of Ukraine – Part of sanctions against Russia
- List of military aid to Ukraine during the Russo-Ukrainian War
- List of Starlink and Starshield launches – Satellite Internet constellation
- Rocket Cargo – Other SpaceX military contract
- Russo-Ukrainian cyberwarfare – Informatic component of the confrontation between Russia and Ukraine
- Space warfare – Combat that takes place in outer space
