= 2026 Starobilsk strike =

2026 drone strike in Russian-occupied Ukraine

2026 Starobilsk dormitory strike
- Part of the Russo-Ukrainian war
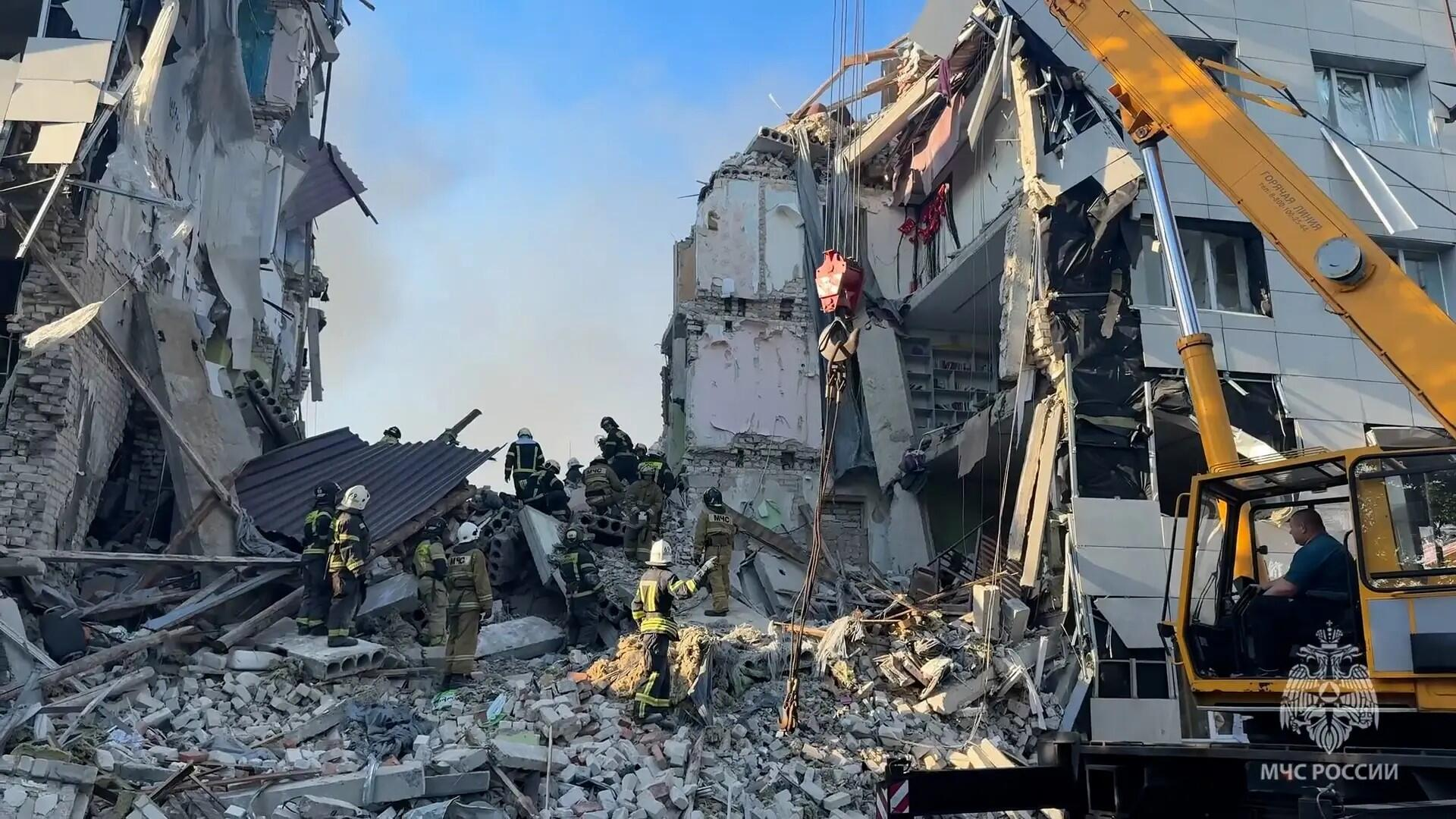
- Starobilsk after attack in 22 May 2026
- Location: 49.2786°N 38.9106°E; Starobilsk Professional College and Starobilsk Pedagogical College, Starobilsk, Luhansk Oblast, Ukraine
- Date: 21–22 May 2026; 22:00 – 02:00
- Attack type: Drone strike
- Deaths: 21 (per the Ministry of Emergency Situations of Russia)
- Injuries: 42 (per the Ministry of Emergency Situations of Russia)
- Perpetrator: Ukrainian Armed Forces (per BBC News Russian)

On 22 May 2026, during the Russo-Ukrainian war, a drone hit a student dormitory and educational buildings in Starobilsk, a city in the Russian-occupied part of Luhansk Oblast, Ukraine. The Russian Emergency Situations Ministry reported that 21 people were killed and 42 others injured. Neither Reuters, the United Nations, or other western countries were able to independently verify any claims about the incident.

At Russia's request following the strike, the United Nations Security Council held an emergency meeting, with Russia accusing Ukraine of war crimes and, which Ukraine rejected. Several UN members requested access to the area for verification, which was not provided, and Russia's call for an emergency meeting despite its own attacks on Ukrainian civilians was also questioned by several nations.

== Background ==
Starobilsk is located in the occupied territory of Luhansk Oblast in eastern Ukraine. Since 2022, as a result of the Russo-Ukrainian war, the city has been under the de facto control of the Luhansk People's Republic, which was later annexed into the Russian Federation, a move largely unrecognized internationally. In the period since incorporation, Russia has pursued a policy of closer economic, social and infrastructure integration of the territories.

The attack took place during a period of intensified cross-border and long-range strikes. In the days preceding the incident, Ukraine had carried out large-scale drone attacks on targets in Russia and Russian-occupied territories, while Russia continued missile and drone attacks on Ukrainian cities.

== Strike ==
Starobilsk College of Luhansk Pedagogical University after strike, 22 May 2026

According to Russian officials, drones struck the dormitory and nearby educational buildings of the Starobilsk College of Luhansk State Pedagogical University during the night of 21–22 May 2026. It is claimed that strikes occurred, beginning at 22:00, in three waves, with 16 Fire Point FP-1/2 one-way attack drones striking the site close to the city center. Russian sources allege that the drones were controlled using Starlink, with the remains of a Starlink Mini terminal displayed amongst the wreckage. Yana Lantratova, a Russian Commissioner for Human Rights, said that 86 teenagers aged between 14 and 18 were asleep in the dormitory at the time of the strike.

Leonid Pasechnik, the Russian-installed head of the Luhansk People's Republic, said that two people had been pulled from the rubble. Meduza, citing local officials, reported that the strike hit a college building and dormitory, and that photographs circulated online showed a heavily damaged building bearing the inscription "Starobilsk Professional College".

Russia's Foreign Affairs Ministry said that the upper three floors of the five-storey dormitory had been destroyed and claimed that there were no military facilities nearby. Reuters and Sky News reported that photographs and video released by Russian authorities showed rescue workers at the scene, damaged buildings, fires and people being carried from the rubble.

Journalist Olena Fetisova clarified, that there were two buildings described as "Starobilsk College" at Gogol Square that were damaged by the strikes – one was Starobilsk Professional College, occupying a historic brown building, and the other was Starobilsk College of Luhansk Pedagogical University, occupying a modern multi-storey building.

== Casualties and damage ==
Initially, on 22 May, Russian authorities reported that six children had died. Russian authorities said four people were killed and 35 children injured. Russian President Vladimir Putin claimed that six people had been killed and 39 injured, with 15 people missing. The Russian Emergency Situations Ministry said on 23 May that 12 people were killed, 48 were injured and nine remained trapped under rubble.

Russian state news agency TASS reported on 23 May that the death toll of "children killed in the Ukrainian drone strike" had risen to 18, with three people believed to be remaining trapped under the rubble.

By 24 May, EMERCOM reported that search and rescue operations had been completed. A total of 21 people had been identified as killed, with 42 injuries.

On 27 May, Meduza listed 21 dead and cited Russian website Bereg which interviewed various friends and family of the dead. Meduza stated that drones struck the Starobilsk Pedagogical College, which shared a building with its dormitory, and the Starobilsk Professional College.

The final list of killed as reported by the Russian Foreign Ministry and Reuters listed 21 dead, aged 18–22. The youngest victim killed had just turned 18.

== Reactions ==
=== Russia ===
The Kremlin condemned the strike. Kremlin spokesman Dmitry Peskov called it a "monstrous crime" and said that those responsible should be punished. Putin accused Ukraine of carrying out a terrorist attack and said that he had asked the Russian defence ministry to prepare options for retaliation.

Later, after a Russian drone struck an apartment building in the city of Galați in Romania, injuring two people, on 29 May, Russian Foreign Affairs Ministry spokeswoman Maria Zakharova stated that the "noise" around this incident was being used by "Westerners" to divert attention from "the killing of children in Starobilsk by Zelensky", which was "committed with EU money and with EU support".

=== Ukraine ===
On 22 May, the General Staff of the Ukrainian Armed Forces said that it had struck a headquarters of the Center for Advanced Unmanned Technologies "Rubicon" in Starobilsk. The Ukrainian General Staff denied that a civilian site had been struck, stating that they "are striking enemy infrastructure in strict compliance with international humanitarian law and the laws of war".

=== United Nations ===
At Russia's request, the United Nations Security Council held an emergency meeting on 22 May following reports of the strike in Starobilsk. The United Nations (UN) said it was alarmed by reports of an overnight attack on a professional school and dormitory in Starobilsk, but noted that it had no access to the Russian-occupied area and could not verify the details of the reported strike.

At the meeting, Russia accused Ukraine of war crimes, while Ukraine rejected the accusation and said it had struck military targets in the area; several countries called for access to the site. Ukraine's ambassador to the UN, Andriy Melnyk, described Russia's accusations as a propaganda show and said Ukrainian operations had targeted Russian military infrastructure, including oil facilities, ammunition depots, air defence assets and command centres.

Kommersant reported that, after Latvia's Permanent Representative to the UN, Sanita Pavļuta-Deslandes, questioned the veracity of Russia's account of the incident, the Russian Foreign Ministry invited foreign correspondents in Russia to visit Starobilsk. Zakharova said the ministry had received many requests from journalists and was forming a press pool for the trip. BBC and CNN correspondents have received invitations but declined to go. Latvia said that while Ukraine provides unimpeded access to verify casualties, Russia denies it in occupied territory, hindering UN verification. Other countries also requesting unfettered access to verify the attack included Liberia and Greece.

The United Kingdom said that the incident had not been objectively or independently verified, and said that due to Russia's refusal of allowing such verification, that may remain the case. The UK also said it "deplores any loss of civilian life or injury, particularly to children", while saying that Russia's invasion of Ukraine is the result of civilian deaths, adding that Russia had killed at least 170 Ukrainian civilians thus far during May 2026 at the time of the meeting.

France called for an independent investigation while saying that the deaths of children are "always unacceptable", also adding that Russia called for the meeting despite "daily bombarding major Ukrainian cities with utter disregard for civilian lives".

UN Special Representative for Children and Armed Conflict Vanessa Frazier stated that the UN is monitoring reports of the strike with concern. She noted that the UN does not have access to the area and cannot confirm the details of the incident.

== Analysis ==
On 24 May, a media trip was organized by the Ministry of Foreign Affairs of Russia. Reuters noted it was not able to independently verify the claims of Russia or Ukraine regarding the strike. Journalists were shown one of the college buildings, but not allowed to see the other destroyed buildings.

Ruslan Leviev did not visit the site, but said that based on open-source intelligence such as obituaries of the deceased, photos and videos from the scene, it can be concluded that the strike hit a pedagogical college building. He stated that within the first 24 hours of the attack, he had not found signs of a military facility (such as a Rubicon headquarters) at the site, and that the dead and injured were college students.

Meduza reported that a foreign journalist taken to the site by Russian authorities saw students' belongings in the destroyed dormitory and no visible signs of a military presence, although journalists were not allowed to inspect other damaged college buildings in the area. The outlet noted inconsistencies in Ukrainian claims and in a purported document circulated online about housing Russian soldiers in a college dormitory, concluding that the available evidence suggested the strike may have resulted from an intelligence error.

According to Defence Matters, casualty data published by occupation authorities appeared to complicate the initial Russian narrative, as the list of reportedly 21 victims contained the names of mostly young adults, not children. Out of the two institutions that were targeted on 22 May, the Starobilsk College of Luhansk Pedagogical University residing in the modern building on Gogol Square 1 was active on social media and this is where journalists were inspecting the debris following the attack. The Starobilsk Professional College stopped posting social media updates in September 2025, and no journalists were allowed to the impact site following the attack. According to The Insider, posts on the college's VKontakte page suggest that at least some in-person classes may still have been held. The Insider also said that the presence of a parallel drone program was difficult to determine, not being officially indicated, but the practice being "generally common" in Russia, adding that if the Ukrainian version is true, one of the two buildings sharing the same address would be a legitimate military target, with the destruction of the second with students being a "tragic mistake".

As of 29 May, there was no evidence confirming that the Russian side had used the professional college building for military purposes as stated by BBC News Russian.

== See also ==
- Attacks in Russia during the Russian invasion of Ukraine
- Russian-occupied territories of Ukraine
- Starlink in the Russo-Ukrainian war
- War crimes in the Russian invasion of Ukraine
