= TriMob =

Ukrainian telecommunications company

TriMob ТОВ "ТриМоб"
- Type: TOV
- Industry: Telecommunications; Mobile communications
- Founded: 1992
- Headquarters: Kyiv, Ukraine
- Products: Mobile phone services 3G: UMTS-2100
- Brands: Utel
- Parent: Ukrtelecom
- Website: 3mob.ua

TriMob LLC (Ukrainian: ТОВ "ТриМоб") d/b/a 3Mob, formerly Ukrtelecom (Ukrainian: (ОГО! мобільний) "Укртелеком"), formerly Utel (Ukrainian: Ютел) is a telecommunications company in Ukraine. It is a subsidiary of Ukrtelecom, formerly government-owned fixed phone operator.

== History ==
Utel was created in January 1992 by a joint venture of AT&T (19.5%), Deutsche Telekom (19.5%), PTT Telecom (10%); the remaining 51% belonged to thirteen Ukrainian state telecommunications operators, which were later consolidated into Ukrtelecom. The company launched Ukraine's first commercial 3G cellular network based on the UMTS/HSDPA standard on November 1, 2007.

Utel logo in 2009

Until 2015, 3Mob was the only network in Ukraine that provided UMTS 2100 service (other providers provided data services on EDGE and CDMA technology). Its 3G coverage exists only in Kyiv, while free 2G/3G roaming is available in Vodafone-Ukraine network.

== Network ==
The network is built on the W-CDMA technology under the UMTS standard and operates at the frequency of 2100 MHz (two FDD bands: 1935—1950 MHz and 2125—2140 MHz). It also supports the HSDPA protocol, which theoretically allows achieving a download speed of 14.4 Mbps. Until 2010, services were provided at a download speed of up to 3.6 Mbps, from 2010 a speed of up to 7.2 Mbps was available.

The core of the network consists of data transmission switches SGSN and GGSN, a switch for voice and video calls MSS and six voice traffic gateways MGW, which are located in the six largest cities of the country.

As of 2011, the 3G network was available in more than 100 cities of Ukraine, where about 35% of the country's population lives, including all regional and the largest industrial and administrative centers of Ukraine. From September 29, 2014, the operator's services became unavailable in Sevastopol. The 2G network (services GSM and GPRS in national roaming mode) has been unavailable in the territory of Crimean Peninsula since September 22, 2014 On the night of February 9 to 10, 2015, due to the seizure of the company's assets, communication services were discontinued throughout the territory of the AR Crimea.

As of August 1, 2017, the network had the least coverage, not being updated since 2015.

On July 11, 2017, LLC «TriMob» received from NCCIR a copy of its own license to provide mobile communication services with the right to technical maintenance and operation of the telecommunications network and granting frequencies to LLC «Lycamobile Ukraine» throughout the territory of Ukraine, based on which on July 24 the operator «Lycamobile Ukraine» began its operation.

At the same time, «Ukrtelecom» announced its intention to invest $2 million in the network owned by «TriMob», primarily to improve the reliability of Lycamobile's connection in Ukraine.

In December 2019, «Ukrtelecom» announced its intention to leave the frequency resource for «TriMob» only within the city of Kyiv, and outside its limits to use the resource licensed to Lycamobile.

As of January 2020, TriMob discontinued support for its own UMTS network, except for the city of Kyiv, switching subscribers to national roaming.
