= Ukrtelecom =

Ukrainian telecommunications company

JSC Ukrtelecom Укртелеком
- Type: Joint stock company
- Traded as: PFTS: UTLM
- Industry: Telecommunications
- Founded: 19 August 1991
- Headquarters: Kyiv, Ukraine
- Key people: Alexander Barinov (Chairman); Yuri Kurmaz (Director)
- Revenue: 4,160,377,000 hryvnia (2025)
- Operating income: ▲ ₴6.8 billion (2015)
- Net income: ▼ ₴6.7 billion (2010)
- Total assets: 13,024,296,000 hryvnia (2025)
- Number of employees: 123,102 (2006)
- Parent: System Capital Management
- Subsidiaries: Utel
- Website: ukrtelecom.ua

Ukrtelecom JSC (Ukrainian: Укртелеком) (PFTS: UTLM) is Ukraine's monopolist telephone company, also active in the ISP and mobile markets. The company was governed by the Ministry of Transportation and Communications of Ukraine with 92.9% shares belonging to the government until 2011, when Austrian investment firm EPIC bought a 92.79 percent stake from the Ukrainian government for $1.3 billion. This stake was resold to System Capital Management of Ukrainian oligarch Rinat Akhmetov.

Ukrtelecom participates in ITUR, TEL/ТАЕ, and BSFOCS international cable systems. Until 1994 the company was known as Ukrelectrozvyazok (Ukrainian: Укрелектрозв'язок).

== History ==
Ukrtelecom's first and previous logo, 19 August 1991 – 31 August 2009

The company was created from the Soviet network of communication only in 1993, however, the network itself came under the jurisdiction of the Ministry of Communications in 1991 after the dissolution of the Soviet Union. According to the company's history, the phone-telegraph communication network in Ukraine before 1991 was only sixth within the Soviet Union and was noticeably backward. All communications outside the Soviet Union was conducted through the Moscow's headquarters. In 1991 there were 7,630 thousands numbers listed, averaging 14.6 numbers for 100 residents.

In 1993 the government confirmed the complex program for creation of the single national system of communication in Ukraine. For the purpose of more effective managing of the industry, it was fully reorganized. Based on the government enterprises two main industrial unions were created: Ukrposhta and Ukrelektrozviazok. The latter was changed in 1994 to Ukrtelekom.

Ukrtelekom upon its creation consisted of seven enterprises and organizations: Ukrtek (Ukrainian enterprise of international and intercity communication and television), Kyiv telegraph, Kyiv city radio broadcasting network, Center of informational technologies, State Institutes "Ukrzviazokproekt", "Dniprozviazok", "Zakarpattelekom".

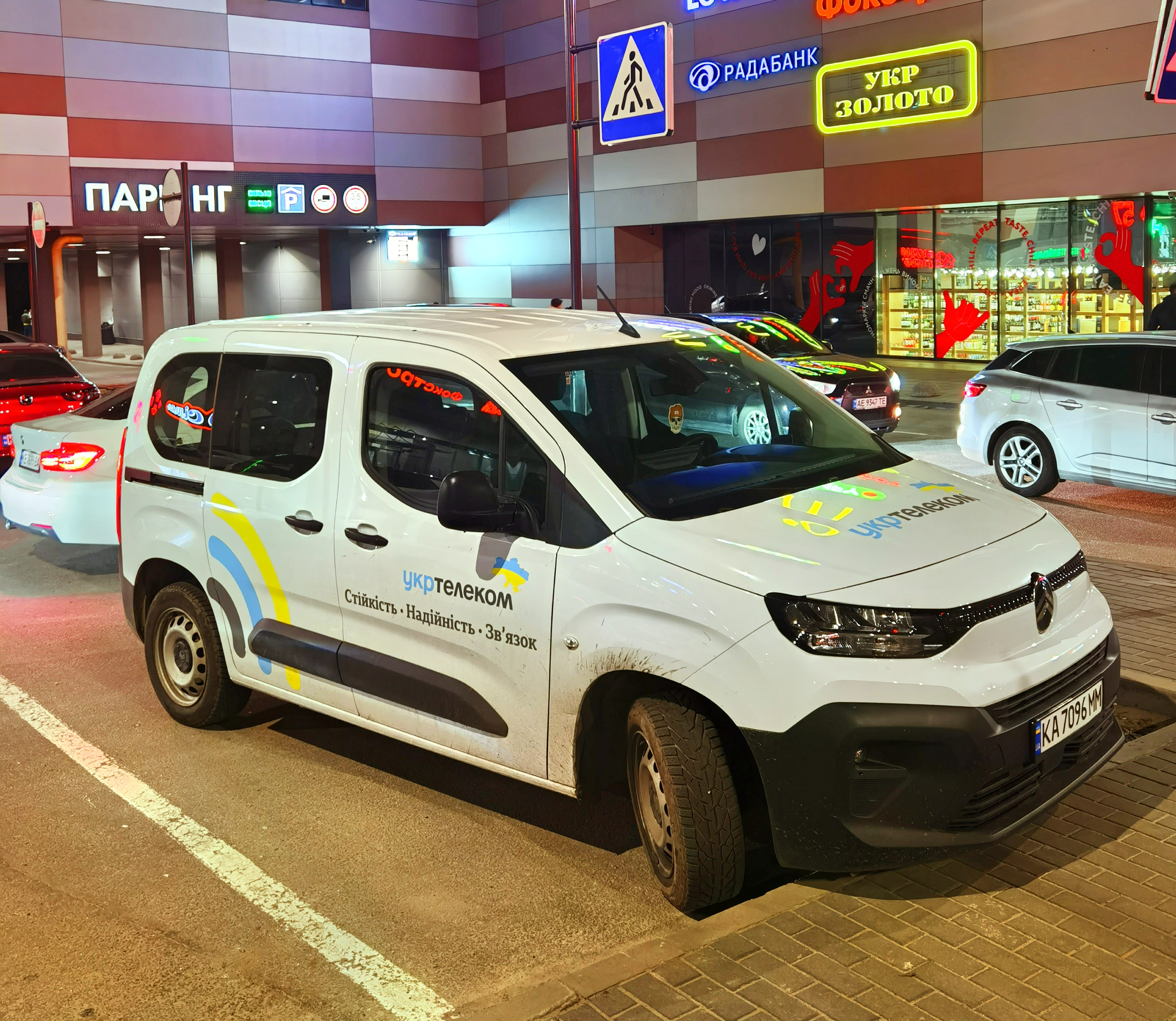
Ukrtelecom car in Dnipro, Ukraine.

In January 1995 to Ukrtelekom were merged other 22 oblast networks as well as the Crimean republican and Sevastopol city communication enterprises. And by the end of the year "Ukrzviazoksuputnyk" was also added to the union. By January 1996 the union absorbed the last enterprise "Dniportelekom".

The union, however, was not as effective as it was thought it should have been and in 1998 Ukrtelekom was restructured to form a single entity out of the union of some 35 state enterprises. By the end of 1999 all the enterprises were reformed into stock associates of the Ukrtelekom company.

In 2009, Ukrtelecom introduced a new logo for the first time in 18 years since 1991, and were at the same time changing its corporate identity. It was reported that the rebranding cost an estimated $100,000 and was ordered in Britain.

The Ukrainian government planned to privatize the company as early as March 2009. On 12 October 2010, the first Azarov government announced the date and starting price for selling Ukrtelecom. Bidding took place on 28 December 2010, with the starting price of all government shares at ₴10.5 billion. Companies with over 25% of shares owned by government or government establishment were announced not eligible for the bidding. Also, the companies whose market share in communications in the country exceeds 25% were announced non-eligible either. The sole bidder at the auction was Ukrainian-registered ESU, a cellular network builder and subsidiary of EPIC Invest, an Austrian-based investment company, which offered to pay the starting price of ₴10.5 billion. ESU then sold this 92.79% stake in Ukrtelecom to System Capital Management of Ukrainian oligarch Rinat Akhmetov.

== Post-privatisation ==
At their first annual general meeting, held on 14 June 2011, the new owners granted the board the right to sell Utel, Ukrtelecom's mobile division, within a half-year. The shareholders also reshuffled the supervisory board, installing their representatives, and increased board responsibilities.

== Operations ==
Public Joint Stock Company Ukrtelecom is one of the largest telecom operators in Ukraine, offering customers in every region virtually the full range of modern telecommunications services. As an infrastructure provider, Ukrtelecom concentrates on expanding its high-speed fiber-optic internet network and, in recent years, has been replacing copper lines with fiber. By early 2021 the company's broadband network covered 3,322 settlements and more than 2,000 local communities, with medical and educational institutions connected to its fiber backbone.

Ukrtelecom is also among the sector's biggest taxpayers and employers.

In 2023, the company maintained network operations in approximately 90 percent of the settlements served prior to the full-scale Russian invasion. It also restored connectivity in de-occupied areas, expanded fiber infrastructure, and delivered several infrastructure projects to support the Ukrainian Armed Forces, government bodies, businesses, and the general public.

In 2024, Ukrtelecom continued to provide telecommunications services to the Armed Forces of Ukraine, government agencies, businesses, social infrastructure facilities, and the general public across the country. Before the full-scale Russian invasion, the corporation maintained internet service availability in 90% of the communities covered by its network, despite the difficult circumstances. Ukrtelecom made timely tax payments, made significant investments in the expansion of the optical network, improved cybersecurity, and supported the Ukrainian Defense Forces.

== Services ==
PJSC Ukrtelecom provides a full range of telecommunications services for both corporate and private clients.

In particular, the company offers converged telecommunications services using the TriMob operator's 3G network and its roaming partner (see TriMob for details), which covers 98% of the country's territory.

Ukrtelecom delivers internet access via both copper and fibre technologies to residential and corporate customers alike. Ukrtelecom broadcasts interactive TV.

Ukrtelecom is the national leader in telephony services, including home phones provided over traditional landlines as well as internet telephony, and various voice solutions for business clients.

During 2023 UAH 20 million was spent on infrastructure restoration, enabling the repair of almost 430 km of fibre-optic lines and 16 km of copper lines, and the reactivation of 10 regional communication hubs.

Ukrtelecom's internet services are available in 90% of the settlements in Ukraine that were covered by the operator's network at the start of the full-scale Russian invasion.

Over the course of 2023 nearly 5.3 thousand kilometres of fibre-optic cable were laid.

In total more than 1,250 medical and almost 1,700 educational institutions now have high-speed fibre access internet.

Ukrtelecom continues to invest systematically in expanding its optical telecommunications infrastructure, ensuring customers have access to modern, reliable, and high-speed connectivity. The company is actively expanding the FTTH/P optical network using GPON technology, which, in addition to numerous advantages, also offers consumers a more energy-independent internet.

In 2024 Ukrtelecom installed nearly 7,000 kilometers of fiber-optic cable, enabling 3 million households nationwide (Homepass) to connect to modern digital services.

Overall, more than 70% of Ukrtelecom's internet users are already using optical access technology, including over 1,300 medical institutions and about 1,780 educational institutions.

The number of connections to the optical network continues to grow across all segments. Over the past year, Ukrtelecom connected 230 additional medical and educational institutions to its optical infrastructure. The total number of new connections to the optical network rose by 22%.

== Financial Highlights ==
According to the results for 2023, PJSC "Ukrtelecom" recorded total revenue of more than UAH 5 billion, 10% lower than in the previous year. EBITDA exceeded UAH 1 billion, with an EBITDA margin of 21.1%. Capital investments in 2023 amounted to almost UAH 500 million. As the largest taxpayer among fixed-line operators and providers in Ukraine, Ukrtelecom paid over UAH 1.35 billion in taxes and fees to budgets at all levels in 2023.

According to the 2024 statistics (2024 data based on unaudited financial filings), JSC "Ukrtelecom" made around 5.3 billion UAH in total revenue, a 4.6% increase over the previous year. The EBITDA margin was 20.0%, and the total sum was over 970 million UAH. Over 750 million UAH was invested in capital projects, a 60% increase over the previous year. Total investments in the company's development exceeded 900 million UAH.

Ukrtelecom remains one of the largest taxpayers in Ukraine's telecommunications sector. During 2024, the business sent more than 1.33 billion UAH in taxes and fees to all levels of budgets.

Despite the difficult conditions of wartime, Ukrtelecom is carrying out emergency repair work wherever possible, including in frontline and de-occupied settlements. In 2024, the company's specialists repaired telecommunications networks almost 3,000 times. Two regional communication hubs were restored. UAH 8.3 million was spent on restoring infrastructure damaged by military operations.

== 2022 Russian invasion ==
On 28 March 2022, during initial stage of the invasion of Ukraine, Ukrtelecom lost an estimated 87% of its nationwide internet connectivity, due to Russian cyberattacks. Ukrtelecom engineers regained control, and full service was restored 15 hours later. A smaller Ukrainian ISP, Triolan, had been attacked earlier in the month.

== See also ==
- Internet in Ukraine
- Ukrposhta
