= Pivdenna Bay =

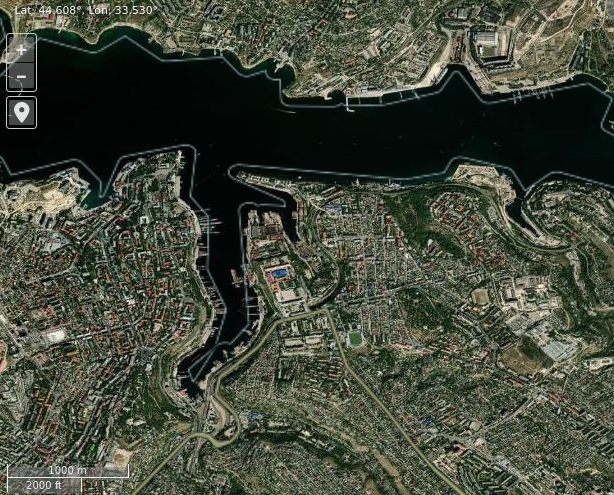
- Satellite imagery of Pivdenna Bay

- Location within Sevastopol
- Location: Black Sea
- Coordinates: 44°36′26.05″N 33°31′52.29″E
- Ocean/sea sources: Atlantic Ocean
- Salinity: 18 ‰
- Settlements: Sevastopol

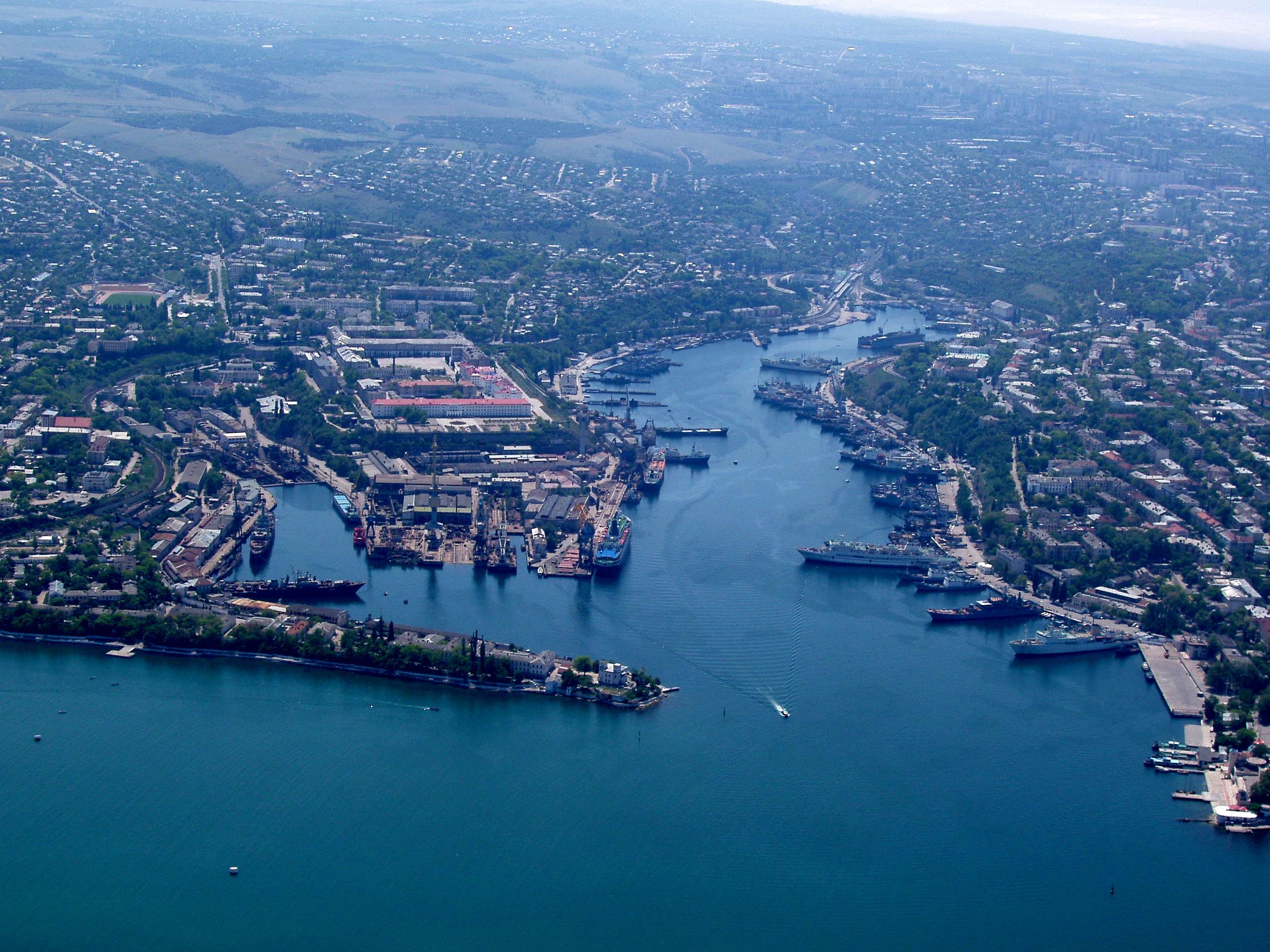
Aerial view looking south into Pivdenna Bay

Pivdenna Bay or Yuzhnaya Bay is one of the harbour bays in Sevastopol.

On March 22, 2014, during the 2014 Russian military intervention in Ukraine, Russian forces captured the only Ukrainian submarine, known as the Zaporizhya, and took it to Pivdenna Bay, according to Vladislav Seleznyov, a spokesman for the Ukrainian military.
