= Lifecell =

Ukrainian mobile operator

lifecell
- Type: Public
- Industry: Telecommunications
- Founded: 2005; 21 years ago
- Headquarters: Kyiv, Ukraine
- Key people: Mykhaylo Shelemba (CEO)
- Products: Mobile phone services, mobile phone related goods
- Revenue: ▲11.712 billion ₴ (2023)
- Net income: ▲2.567 billion ₴ (2023)
- Total assets: 19,949,706,000 hryvnia (2025)
- Parent: NJJ Holding (85%), Horizon Capital (10%), Mikhaylo Shelemba (5%)
- Website: lifecell.ua/en

Logo in 2005–2016

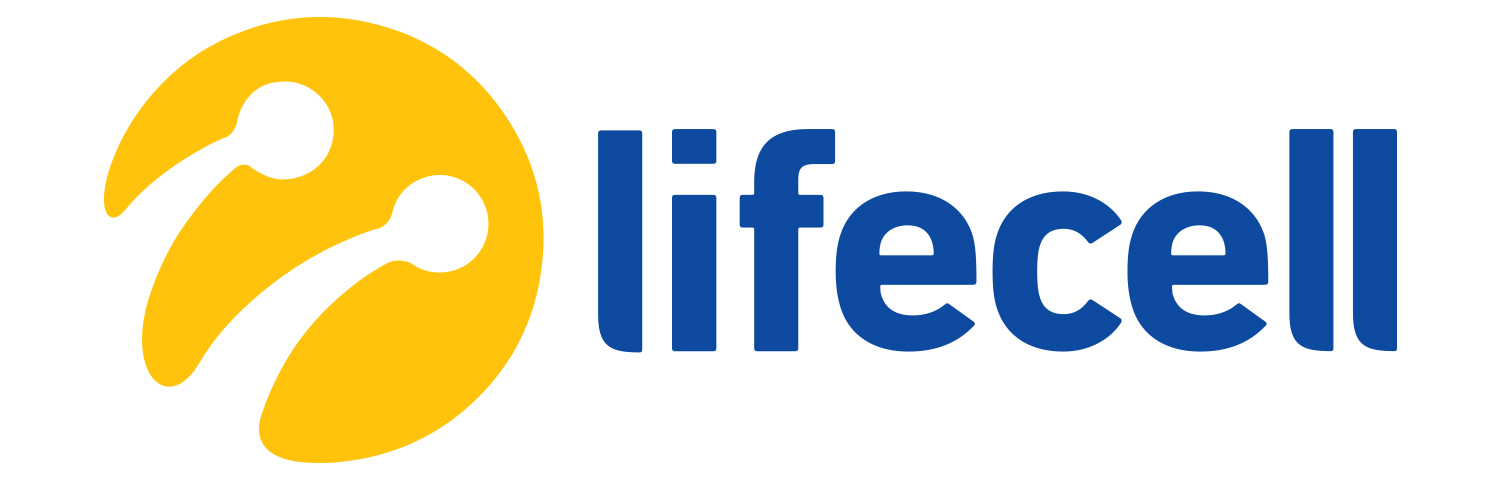
Logo in 2016-2025

lifecell (formerly DCC, and later life:)) is a Ukrainian telecommunications company based in Kyiv. It is the third largest Ukrainian mobile telephone network operator, (after Kyivstar and Vodafone Ukraine) covering 98.82% of Ukrainian inhabited territory. KKR is the parent company of Lifecell. Lifecell's dialing prefixes are +38063, +38093 and +38073.

As of the end of Q3 of 2014, Ukrainian GSM operator life:) serves 13.6 million subscribers of prepaid, contract and corporate subscription. Company provides roaming opportunities in 184 countries via more than 456 roaming partners. The operator was the first mobile network operator in Ukraine to introduce EDGE technology that offers high speed data transfer. Now the technology is enabled in 100% life:) network.

As of today, six lifecell customer service centers and 193 exclusive shops operate in 103 cities of Ukraine. In addition, life:) subscribers can order life:) services through 153 branded points of sale and 49 487 GSM and non-GSM sales points throughout Ukraine.

== History ==
In January 2005, Astelit launched GSM-1800 service under the life:) brand, and has attracted 7.6 million contract and prepaid subscribers by December 2007.

In June 2011, it was reported that Russian conglomerate Alfa Group was negotiating a deal to purchase the 45% share in Astelit.

In July 2015, Turkcell completed the acquisition of a 44.96% stake in the company owned by Rinat Akhmetov's SCM Holdings.

In 2017, the company ended its operations in Ukraine's Russian-occupied territories Donetsk People's Republic and Luhansk People's Republic.

In 2018, the operator received licenses for 4G LTE in the ranges of 2600 MHz and 1800 MHz. On March 30, 2018, lifecell launched LTE Advanced Pro standard in about 20 cities of Ukraine. First and foremost, Kyiv, Lviv, Kharkiv, Odesa and Dnipro. The company launched its 4G network on 1 July 2018. It is planned that by the end of 2018 the new standard will be available in 1500 cities, covering up to 50% of the total population of Ukraine.

In January 2025, dual stack IPv6/IPv4 network was made available to mobile customers.

== Corporate social responsibility ==
In 2007, lifecell joined the UN Global Compact, as an initiative to encourage CSR (corporate social responsibility) practices by example including the 10 basic principles of human rights, labor standards, environmental protection and anti-corruption measures.
