= Pirogovo =

Pirogovo (Russian: Пирогово) is the name of several rural localities in Russia.

== Modern localities ==
=== Arkhangelsk Oblast ===
As of 2012, one rural locality in Arkhangelsk Oblast bears this name:

- Pirogovo, Arkhangelsk Oblast, a village in Ilyinsky Selsoviet of Vilegodsky District

=== Belgorod Oblast ===
As of 2012, one rural locality in Belgorod Oblast bears this name:

- Pirogovo, Belgorod Oblast, a selo in Alexeyevsky District

=== Ivanovo Oblast ===
As of 2012, two rural localities in Ivanovo Oblast bear this name:

- Pirogovo, Ivanovsky District, Ivanovo Oblast, a village in Ivanovsky District
- Pirogovo, Lukhsky District, Ivanovo Oblast, a village in Lukhsky District

=== Kaliningrad Oblast ===
As of 2012, one rural locality in Kaliningrad Oblast bears this name:

- Pirogovo, Kaliningrad Oblast, a settlement in Khrabrovsky Rural Okrug of Guryevsky District

=== Kaluga Oblast ===
As of 2012, one rural locality in Kaluga Oblast bears this name:

- Pirogovo, Kaluga Oblast, a village in Maloyaroslavetsky District

=== Kirov Oblast ===
As of 2012, two rural localities in Kirov Oblast bear this name:

- Pirogovo, Lebyazhsky District, Kirov Oblast, a village in Lazhsky Rural Okrug of Lebyazhsky District
- Pirogovo, Sovetsky District, Kirov Oblast, a village in Rodyginsky Rural Okrug of Sovetsky District

=== Kostroma Oblast ===
As of 2012, four rural localities in Kostroma Oblast bear this name:

- Pirogovo, Buysky District, Kostroma Oblast, a village in Tsentralnoye Settlement of Buysky District
- Pirogovo, Volzhskoye Settlement, Nerekhtsky District, Kostroma Oblast, a village in Volzhskoye Settlement of Nerekhtsky District
- Pirogovo, Voskresenskoye Settlement, Nerekhtsky District, Kostroma Oblast, a village in Voskresenskoye Settlement of Nerekhtsky District
- Pirogovo, Yemsnenskoye Settlement, Nerekhtsky District, Kostroma Oblast, a selo in Yemsnenskoye Settlement of Nerekhtsky District

=== Mari El Republic ===
As of 2012, one rural locality in the Mari El Republic bears this name:

- Pirogovo, Mari El Republic, a village in Serdezhsky Rural Okrug of Sernursky District

=== Moscow Oblast ===
As of 2012, three rural localities in Moscow Oblast bear this name:

- Pirogovo, Istrinsky District, Moscow Oblast, a village in Kostrovskoye Rural Settlement of Istrinsky District
- Pirogovo (settlement), Mytishchinsky District, Moscow Oblast, a settlement under the administrative jurisdiction of Pirogovsky Work Settlement in Mytishchinsky District
- Pirogovo (village), Mytishchinsky District, Moscow Oblast, a village under the administrative jurisdiction of Pirogovsky Work Settlement in Mytishchinsky District

=== Nizhny Novgorod Oblast ===
As of 2012, one rural locality in Nizhny Novgorod Oblast bears this name:

- Pirogovo, Nizhny Novgorod Oblast, a village in Lindovsky Selsoviet under the administrative jurisdiction of the town of oblast significance of Bor

=== Novgorod Oblast ===
As of 2012, two rural localities in Novgorod Oblast bear this name:

- Pirogovo, Pestovsky District, Novgorod Oblast, a village in Bogoslovskoye Settlement of Pestovsky District
- Pirogovo, Soletsky District, Novgorod Oblast, a village in Dubrovskoye Settlement of Soletsky District

=== Perm Krai ===
As of 2012, one rural locality in Perm Krai bears this name:

- Pirogovo, Perm Krai, a village in Karagaysky District

=== Pskov Oblast ===
As of 2012, one rural locality in Pskov Oblast bears this name:

- Pirogovo, Pskov Oblast, a village in Velikoluksky District

=== Smolensk Oblast ===
As of 2012, one rural locality in Smolensk Oblast bears this name:

- Pirogovo, Smolensk Oblast, a village in Vadinskoye Rural Settlement of Safonovsky District

=== Sverdlovsk Oblast ===
As of 2012, one rural locality in Sverdlovsk Oblast bears this name:

- Pirogovo, Sverdlovsk Oblast, a selo in Kamensky District

=== Tula Oblast ===
As of 2012, two rural localities in Tula Oblast bear this name:

- Pirogovo, Venyovsky District, Tula Oblast, a village in Aksinyinsky Rural Okrug of Venyovsky District
- Pirogovo, Zaoksky District, Tula Oblast, a village in Gatnitsky Rural Okrug of Zaoksky District

=== Tver Oblast ===
As of 2012, two rural localities in Tver Oblast bear this name:

- Pirogovo, Kalininsky District, Tver Oblast, a village in Verkhnevolzhskoye Rural Settlement of Kalininsky District
- Pirogovo, Torzhoksky District, Tver Oblast, a village in Pirogovskoye Rural Settlement of Torzhoksky District

=== Udmurt Republic ===
As of 2012, two rural localities in the Udmurt Republic bear this name:

- Pirogovo, Alnashsky District, Udmurt Republic, a village in Bayteryakovsky Selsoviet of Alnashsky District
- Pirogovo, Zavyalovsky District, Udmurt Republic, a village in Pirogovsky Selsoviet of Zavyalovsky District

=== Vladimir Oblast ===
As of 2012, one rural locality in Vladimir Oblast bears this name:

- Pirogovo, Vladimir Oblast, a village in Kameshkovsky District

=== Vologda Oblast ===
As of 2012, six rural localities in Vologda Oblast bear this name:

- Pirogovo, Gryazovetsky District, Vologda Oblast, a village in Pertsevsky Selsoviet of Gryazovetsky District
- Pirogovo, Kadnikovsky Selsoviet, Sokolsky District, Vologda Oblast, a village in Kadnikovsky Selsoviet of Sokolsky District
- Pirogovo, Vorobyevsky Selsoviet, Sokolsky District, Vologda Oblast, a village in Vorobyevsky Selsoviet of Sokolsky District
- Pirogovo, Syamzhensky District, Vologda Oblast, a village in Goluzinsky Selsoviet of Syamzhensky District
- Pirogovo, Vologodsky District, Vologda Oblast, a village in Sosnovsky Selsoviet of Vologodsky District
- Pirogovo, Vytegorsky District, Vologda Oblast, a village in Andomsky Selsoviet of Vytegorsky District

=== Voronezh Oblast ===
As of 2012, one rural locality in Voronezh Oblast bears this name:

- Pirogovo, Voronezh Oblast, a selo in Semenovskoye Rural Settlement of Kalacheyevsky District

=== Yaroslavl Oblast ===
As of 2012, three rural localities in Yaroslavl Oblast bear this name:

- Pirogovo, Lyubimsky District, Yaroslavl Oblast, a village in Pokrovsky Rural Okrug of Lyubimsky District
- Pirogovo, Nekrasovsky District, Yaroslavl Oblast, a village in Klimovsky Rural Okrug of Nekrasovsky District
- Pirogovo, Rybinsky District, Yaroslavl Oblast, a village in Shashkovsky Rural Okrug of Rybinsky District

== Alternative names ==
- Pirogovo, alternative name of Pirogovka, a selo in Pirogovka Selsoviet of Akhtubinsky District in Astrakhan Oblast; 47°53′N 46°38′E
- Pirogovo, alternative name of Pyrohiv, a historic location in the outskirts of Kiev, Ukraine, that houses an open-air museum;
