= Pestovo =

Pestovo (Russian: Пестово) is the name of several inhabited localities in Russia.

== Arkhangelsk Oblast ==
As of 2010, two rural localities in Arkhangelsk Oblast bear this name:

- Pestovo, Ustyansky District, Arkhangelsk Oblast, a village in Bestuzhevsky Selsoviet of Ustyansky District
- Pestovo, Vilegodsky District, Arkhangelsk Oblast, a village in Ilyinsky Selsoviet of Vilegodsky District

== Ivanovo Oblast ==
As of 2010, three rural localities in Ivanovo Oblast bear this name:

- Pestovo, Lukhsky District, Ivanovo Oblast, a village in Lukhsky District
- Pestovo (Ramenskoye Rural Settlement), Palekhsky District, Ivanovo Oblast, a village in Palekhsky District; municipally, a part of Ramenskoye Rural Settlement of that district
- Pestovo (Panovskoye Rural Settlement), Palekhsky District, Ivanovo Oblast, a village in Palekhsky District; municipally, a part of Panovskoye Rural Settlement of that district

== Kirov Oblast ==
As of 2010, one rural locality in Kirov Oblast bears this name:

- Pestovo, Kirov Oblast, a village under the administrative jurisdiction of the urban-type settlement of Lalsk, Luzsky District

== Kostroma Oblast ==
As of 2010, three rural localities in Kostroma Oblast bear this name:

- Pestovo, Antropovsky District, Kostroma Oblast, a village in Kurnovskoye Settlement of Antropovsky District
- Pestovo, Dmitriyevskoye Settlement, Galichsky District, Kostroma Oblast, a village in Dmitriyevskoye Settlement of Galichsky District
- Pestovo, Stepanovskoye Settlement, Galichsky District, Kostroma Oblast, a village in Stepanovskoye Settlement of Galichsky District

== Kurgan Oblast ==
As of 2010, one rural locality in Kurgan Oblast bears this name:

- Pestovo, Kurgan Oblast, a village in Vvedensky Selsoviet of Mishkinsky District

== Moscow Oblast ==
As of 2010, five rural localities in Moscow Oblast bear this name:

- Pestovo, Balashikha, Moscow Oblast, a village under the administrative jurisdiction of the Balashikha City Under Oblast Jurisdiction
- Pestovo, Domodedovo, Moscow Oblast, a village under the administrative jurisdiction of the Domodedovo Town Under Oblast Jurisdiction
- Pestovo, Mytishchinsky District, Moscow Oblast, a settlement under the administrative jurisdiction of the work settlement of Pirogovsky, Mytishchinsky District
- Pestovo, Odintsovsky District, Moscow Oblast, a village in Nikolskoye Rural Settlement of Odintsovsky District
- Pestovo, Pavlovo-Posadsky District, Moscow Oblast, a village in Averkiyevskoye Rural Settlement of Pavlovo-Posadsky District

== Nizhny Novgorod Oblast ==
As of 2010, four rural localities in Nizhny Novgorod Oblast bear this name:

- Pestovo, Kumokhinsky Selsoviet, Gorodetsky District, Nizhny Novgorod Oblast, a village in Kumokhinsky Selsoviet of Gorodetsky District
- Pestovo, Zinyakovsky Selsoviet, Gorodetsky District, Nizhny Novgorod Oblast, a village in Zinyakovsky Selsoviet of Gorodetsky District
- Pestovo, Sharangsky District, Nizhny Novgorod Oblast, a village in Bolsherudkinsky Selsoviet of Sharangsky District
- Pestovo, Sokolsky District, Nizhny Novgorod Oblast, a village in Loyminsky Selsoviet of Sokolsky District

== Novgorod Oblast ==
As of 2010, eight inhabited localities in Novgorod Oblast bear this name.

Urban localities

- Pestovo, Pestovsky District, Novgorod Oblast, a town in Pestovsky District; administratively incorporated as a town of district significance

Rural localities

- Pestovo, Demyansky District, Novgorod Oblast, a village in Pesotskoye Settlement of Demyansky District
- Pestovo, Moshenskoy District, Novgorod Oblast, a village in Kirovskoye Settlement of Moshenskoy District
- Pestovo, Borovenkovskoye Settlement, Okulovsky District, Novgorod Oblast, a village in Borovenkovskoye Settlement of Okulovsky District
- Pestovo, Kulotino, Okulovsky District, Novgorod Oblast, a village under the administrative jurisdiction of the urban-type settlement of Kulotino, Okulovsky District
- Pestovo, Nagovskoye Settlement, Starorussky District, Novgorod Oblast, a village in Nagovskoye Settlement of Starorussky District
- Pestovo, Velikoselskoye Settlement, Starorussky District, Novgorod Oblast, a village in Velikoselskoye Settlement of Starorussky District
- Pestovo, Valdaysky District, Novgorod Oblast, a village in Yazhelbitskoye Settlement of Valdaysky District

== Pskov Oblast ==
As of 2010, six rural localities in Pskov Oblast bear this name:

- Pestovo, Novorzhevsky District, Pskov Oblast, a village in Novorzhevsky District
- Pestovo, Novosokolnichesky District, Pskov Oblast, a village in Novosokolnichesky District
- Pestovo, Palkinsky District, Pskov Oblast, a village in Palkinsky District
- Pestovo, Porkhovsky District, Pskov Oblast, a village in Porkhovsky District
- Pestovo, Pushkinogorsky District, Pskov Oblast, a village in Pushkinogorsky District
- Pestovo, Velikoluksky District, Pskov Oblast, a village in Velikoluksky District

== Tula Oblast ==
As of 2010, one rural locality in Tula Oblast bears this name:

- Pestovo, Tula Oblast, a village in Kondukovskaya Rural Administration of Uzlovsky District

== Tver Oblast ==
As of 2010, ten rural localities in Tver Oblast bear this name:

- Pestovo (Lugovskoye Rural Settlement), Andreapolsky District, Tver Oblast, a village in Andreapolsky District; municipally, a part of Lugovskoye Rural Settlement of that district
- Pestovo (Aksenovskoye Rural Settlement), Andreapolsky District, Tver Oblast, a village in Andreapolsky District; municipally, a part of Aksenovskoye Rural Settlement of that district
- Pestovo, Kalininsky District, Tver Oblast, a village in Kalininsky District
- Pestovo, Kimrsky District, Tver Oblast, a village in Kimrsky District
- Pestovo, Lesnoy District, Tver Oblast, a village in Lesnoy District
- Pestovo, Spirovsky District, Tver Oblast, a village in Spirovsky District
- Pestovo, Torzhoksky District, Tver Oblast, a village in Torzhoksky District
- Pestovo, Vyshnevolotsky District, Tver Oblast, a village in Vyshnevolotsky District
- Pestovo, Zapadnodvinsky District, Tver Oblast, a village in Zapadnodvinsky District
- Pestovo, Zubtsovsky District, Tver Oblast, a village in Zubtsovsky District

== Tyumen Oblast ==
As of 2010, one rural locality in Tyumen Oblast bears this name:

- Pestovo, Tyumen Oblast, a selo in Balagansky Rural Okrug of Vikulovsky District

== Vladimir Oblast ==
As of 2010, one rural locality in Vladimir Oblast bears this name:

- Pestovo, Vladimir Oblast, a village in Kovrovsky District

== Vologda Oblast ==
As of 2010, six rural localities in Vologda Oblast bear this name:

- Pestovo, Churovsky Selsoviet, Sheksninsky District, Vologda Oblast, a village in Churovsky Selsoviet of Sheksninsky District
- Pestovo, Domshinsky Selsoviet, Sheksninsky District, Vologda Oblast, a village in Domshinsky Selsoviet of Sheksninsky District
- Pestovo, Nizhneshardengsky Selsoviet, Velikoustyugsky District, Vologda Oblast, a village in Nizhneshardengsky Selsoviet of Velikoustyugsky District
- Pestovo, Teplogorsky Selsoviet, Velikoustyugsky District, Vologda Oblast, a village in Teplogorsky Selsoviet of Velikoustyugsky District
- Pestovo, Tregubovsky Selsoviet, Velikoustyugsky District, Vologda Oblast, a village in Tregubovsky Selsoviet of Velikoustyugsky District
- Pestovo, Vologodsky District, Vologda Oblast, a village in Oktyabrsky Selsoviet of Vologodsky District

== Yaroslavl Oblast ==
As of 2010, three rural localities in Yaroslavl Oblast bear this name:

- Pestovo, Bolsheselsky District, Yaroslavl Oblast, a village in Novoselsky Rural Okrug of Bolsheselsky District
- Pestovo, Borisoglebsky District, Yaroslavl Oblast, a village in Krasnooktyabrsky Rural Okrug of Borisoglebsky District
- Pestovo, Yaroslavsky District, Yaroslavl Oblast, a village in Bekrenevsky Rural Okrug of Yaroslavsky District
