= Volodymyr Lavrenchuk =

Ukrainian banker

- Володимир Лавренчук
- Born: September 17, 1957 (age 69); Kyiv, Ukrainian SSR, Soviet Union
- Honours: Decoration of Honour for Services to the Republic of Austria

Vladymyr Lavrenchuk (September 17, 1957) is a Ukrainian banker and top manager. Regional director of NEQSOL Holding Ukraine (2021–present), CEO of Raiffeisen Bank Ukraine (2005–2019), CEO of Ukrinbank (1997–2002).

== Biography ==
Born in Kyiv, Ukraine, in 1957, Lavrenchuk graduated from the Department of Finance and Economics of the Kyiv Institute of National Economy (now the Vadym Hetman Kyiv National Economic University) with a degree in economics in 1982 and started working in the banking sector.

In 1982–1988, he worked as an economist at the Ukrainian Republican Office of the State Bank.

In 1988–1997, he worked at the State Savings Bank of Ukraine as the Chief Economist and later as Deputy Chair of the Board.

In 1997–2002, he held the position of Chair of the Board of Ukrinbank.

In 2002, he became a member of the Management Board of Raiffeisen Bank Ukraine.

From October 2005 to October 2019, he served as a Chair of the Board of Raiffeisen Bank Aval Ukraine (after the acquisition of Bank Aval by the Austrian Raiffeisen Bank International). Under Lavrenchuk’s leadership, Raiffeisen Bank Aval successfully integrated and developed in the international group Raiffeisen Bank International, and was consistently recognized in the ratings of Ukrainian and international media, such as Euromoney, EMEA Finance, Business New Europe, Global Finance, The Banker, NV.ua, Focus, Minfin, mind, Financial Club, Korrespondent, and others.

In August 2020, he joined NEQSOL Holding as an independent member of the Supervisory Board of Vodafone Ukraine. Since March 1, 2021, he has run the NEQSOL Holding office in Ukraine with a focus on investment activities and asset portfolio management.

Lavrenchuk is a member of the supervisory board of the GLOBSEC think tank, the supervisory board of the VoxUkraine think tank, The Senate (Supervisory Council) of the Ukrainian Catholic University, and a member of the supervisory board of Vodafone Ukraine.

Volodymyr Lavrenchuk co-founded and was the first president of the Forum for Leading International Financial Institutions (FLIFI), created in 2015 with the involvement of the International Monetary Fund (IMF) to help the Ukrainian banking sector emerge from the financial crisis.

In 2017, after the resignation of Valeria Hontareva, Volodymyr Lavrenchuk was one of the main candidates for the post of the Governor of the National Bank of Ukraine.

== Honors and awards ==
In 2015, Volodymyr Lavrenchuk took first place in the nomination Banker of the Year in the financial rating of the newspaper Business and topped the rating of the best bankers in Ukraine by the DELO business portal.

He received the highest award of the Republic of Austria, Decoration of Honour for Services to the Republic of Austria, for implementing high standards of business and corporate culture in a transition economy.

== Personal life ==
Volodymyr Lavrenchuk created the rock musical Got To Be Free, which was directed by Serhii Proskurnia at several venues in Ukraine and Canada. In 2019-2020, it was included in the repertoire of the Theater on Podil (directed by Vitaliy Malakhov). In 2022, a movie version of the rock musical Got To Be Free was filmed (directed by Oles Sanin).
