= Azerconnect Group =

Azerbaijani telecommunications company

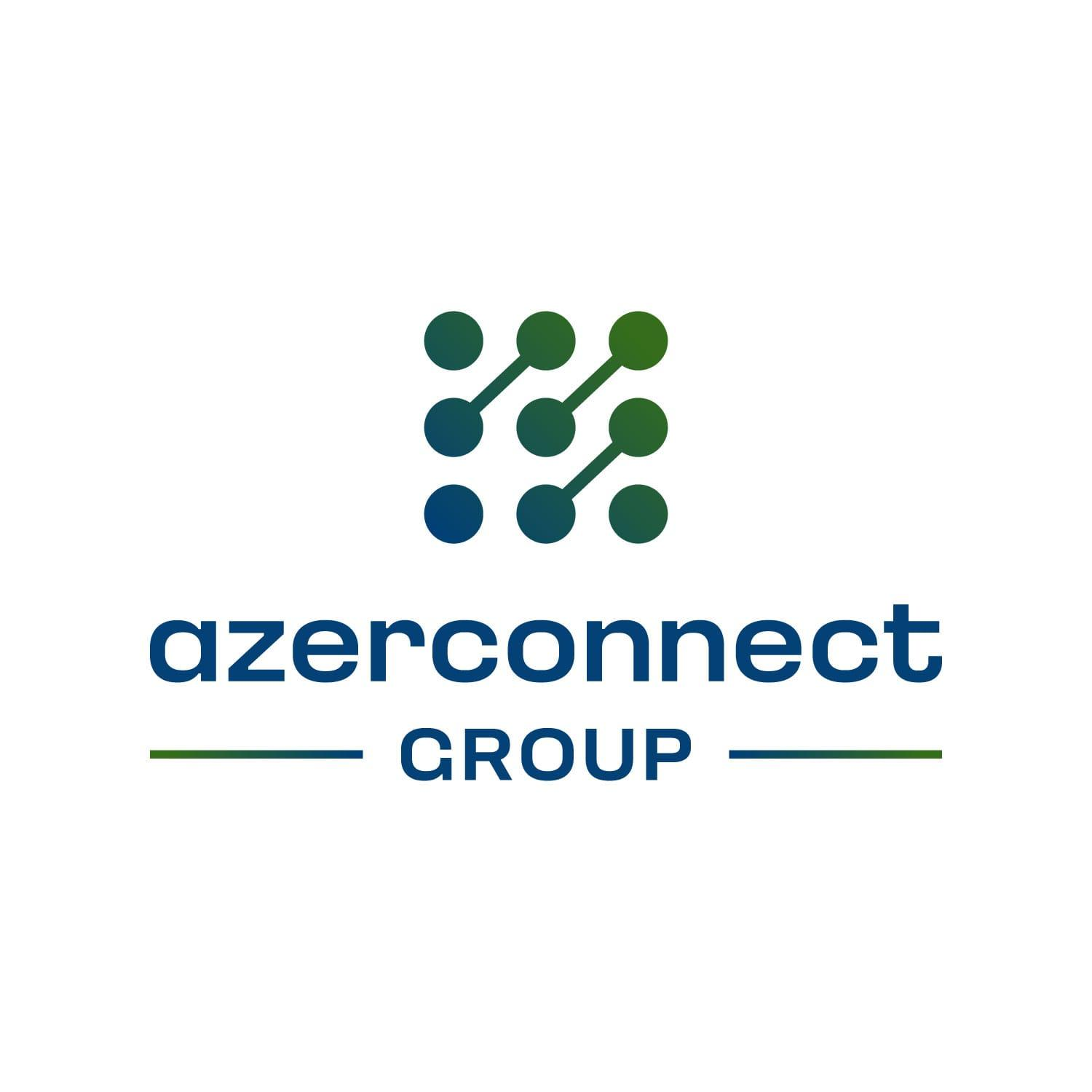
- Industry: Telecommunications, Information and communication technology
- Founded: 2013
- Headquarters: Baku, Azerbaijan
- Key people: Emil Masimov (CEO)
- Number of employees: 4,000+
- Website: azerconnect.az

Azerconnect Group is an Azerbaijani information and communication technology (ICT) and telecommunications company founded in 2013 and headquartered in Baku, Azerbaijan. The company delivers mobile and internet services, international leased line connectivity, and digital services in FinTech, AdTech, and Media/TV. Azerconnect Group is part of NEQSOL Holding, an international group of companies operating in various countries across the energy, telecommunications, hi-tech, and construction industries.

== History ==
Azerconnect Group was founded in 2013 in Baku, Azerbaijan, and operates in the ICT and high-technology sectors. The company is led by CEO Emil Masimov. It provides services in mobile communications, internet access, and international leased line provisioning, as well as digital services in FinTech, AdTech, and Media/TV. In May 2021, Azerconnect Group launched the FLEXcellence programme, introducing flexible and hybrid working arrangements for its employees. In 2024, Azerconnect Group joined the United Nations Global Compact, aligning its activities with the initiative's principles on environmental, social, and corporate governance and with the UN Sustainable Development Goals.

== Vodafone partnership ==
In June 2024, Azerconnect Group entered into a partnership with Vodafone Group, focusing on digitisation, network technologies, security operations, and commercial services. Signed by Azerconnect Group CEO Emil Masimov and Vodafone executive Johannes Hummer, the agreement covers the deployment of advanced network technologies, Security Operations Centres (SOC), and accelerated digitization. The partnership enables Azerconnect Group to use Vodafone's technical expertise and global presence to optimize costs, improve mobile, fixed-line, and international services in fintech, adtech, TV and media sectors.

== Activities ==
Digital Silk Way is an international telecommunications project creating a high-capacity digital corridor connecting Europe and Asia. The project was initiated by NEQSOL Holding and is being implemented by AzerTelecom, part of Azerconnect Group. The route is planned to pass through several countries, including Azerbaijan, Georgia, Türkiye, Kazakhstan, and Turkmenistan, providing high-speed data transmission with minimal latency. The project aims to enhance internet capacity and connectivity in the region, meet growing traffic demand, improve service quality, and support economic stability and regional cooperation.

The company also collaborates with a range of local and international partners, including Bakcell, AzerTelecom, Pasa Construction, Nokia, Microsoft, Oracle, Huawei, Xalq Bank, Xalq Sigorta, BBTV, Ultel, and Nar, among others.

== Community and media initiatives ==
Azerconnect Group has participated in the 4Sİ Academy – National Program and supported international conferences on cyber diplomacy in Azerbaijan. In 2025, the company, in collaboration with the Media Development Agency, organized a media forum for young journalists titled “The Media of the Future: Following the Footsteps of Akinchi”, celebrating the 150th anniversary of the Azerbaijani national press. Azerconnect Group was also featured in TIME magazine, highlighting its activities and initiatives in the ICT sector.

The company's human capital development strategy, including its efforts to promote diversity, equity, inclusion, and belonging (DEIB) principles, was extensively covered in the World Bank report “Removing Barriers to Women’s Employment in Azerbaijan.”'

== Memberships ==
Azerconnect Group is a participant in the United Nations Global Compact, a member of the American Chamber of Commerce in Azerbaijan (AmCham Azerbaijan), and a member of the Azerbaijan Cybersecurity Organizations Association (AKTA).

== Awards ==
In 2023, 2024, and 2025, Azerconnect Group was certified as a Top Employer in Azerbaijan by the Top Employers Institute. In 2024, the company was awarded the “Gender Inclusive Workplace” distinction by the United Nations Development Programme (UNDP) in Azerbaijan.

Azerconnect Group was also recognized in 2024 as a winner of the “Best Managed Companies Azerbaijan” award, established by the international audit firm Deloitte. The company received multiple Brandon Hall Group HCM Excellence Awards for its human resources management initiatives: six awards in 2024 and three awards in 2023 across various categories.

Additionally, the company was awarded international Stevie Awards in 2023 and 2024 in three categories for its innovative projects.
