= Rinat Akhmetov Foundation =

Ukrainian non-profit organization

The Rinat Akhmetov Foundation (former Foundation for Development of Ukraine) is a non-profit organization established on July 15, 2005 by Rinat Leonidovich Akhmetov, a Ukrainian businessman. The previous name of the organization was Foundation for the "Development of Ukraine". Mission of the Foundation is: "Work for people by eliminating the causes of burning social problems; implementing the best practices of Ukraine and other countries, developing unique system solutions; obtaining the optimal result with every project and action". Foundation has two offices functioning in Kyiv and Donetsk, Ukraine.

== History ==
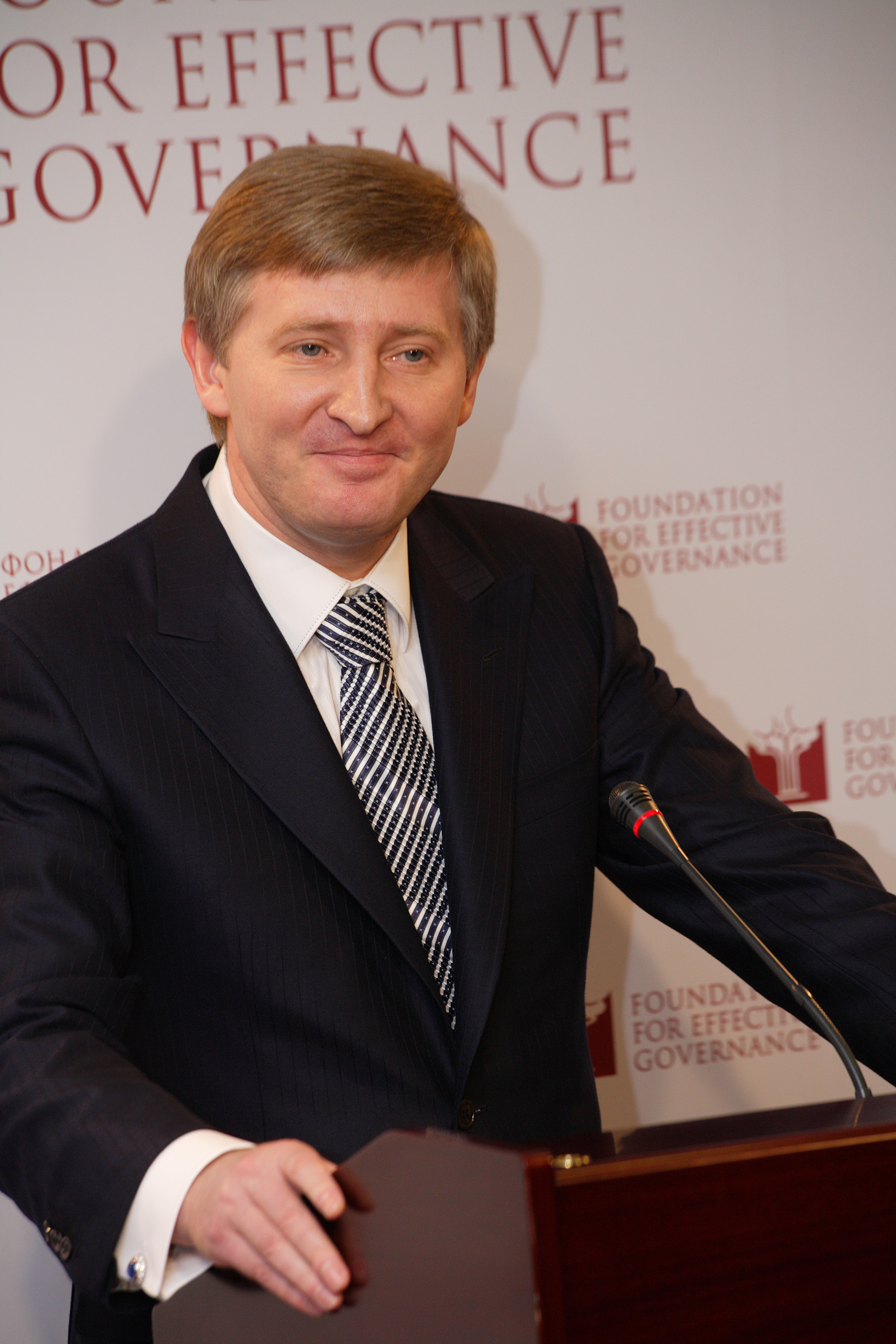
Rinat Akhmetov, 2007

The Foundation was created by SCM Holdings as part of the implementation of its corporate social responsibility policy. Before March 2008, the Foundation for Development of Ukraine functioned as SCM Group's corporate charitable foundation. Since March 19, 2008, the Foundation for Development of Ukraine has been operating as a private charity of Rinat Akhmetov, the main shareholder of SCM Group, while remaining SCM's permanent partner in the implementation of various projects in the field of charity.

In 2014, the Foundation initiated its largest program, Rinat Akhmetov Humanitarian Center, to assist residents of Donbas who suffered from the armed conflict. During six years, the Foundation focused all of its resources on helping Donbass civilians affected by the armed conflict. Over 16 years of its work, the Foundation helped eight million people survive, three and a half million of them received help in Donbas in the framework of the program Rinat Akhmetov Humanitarian Center. In March 2021, the Foundation teamed up with British experts and made a survey of the social impact from the project Food Assistance to Population. The social value of the Rinat Akhmetov Foundation's help to beneficiaries is worth more than $1 billion.

In 2017, the Rinat Akhmetov Foundation ranked the first among the Top 5 private charitable foundations of Ukraine. In addition, for many years, the Foundation has remained the best-known charitable organization in Ukraine and a leader in providing humanitarian aid. According to a survey by Kyiv International Institute of Sociology (KIIS), this is the opinion the majority of Ukrainians expressed – 95% of population. During the KIIS survey, almost half of the country's citizens named the Rinat Akhmetov Foundation the largest charitable organization in Ukraine.

In February 2022, with the beginning of a new phase of the war between Russia and Ukraine, the Foundation focused its efforts on humanitarian aid to Ukraine and Ukrainians. This included food assistance packages for population and medicines for public hospitals. From the outbreak of the full-scale Russian invasion of Ukraine, the Foundation provided more than 500,000 units of medicines to the Ministry of Health of Ukraine.

=== Mission of the Rinat Akhmetov Foundation ===
The mission of the Rinat Akhmetov Foundation is to help people in Ukraine and create opportunities to become better and live better using the Foundation's own achievements and global experience of philanthropy. For the sake of the future.

== Key activity areas and projects ==
=== Program Rinat Akhmetov – Saving Lives ===
Within the framework of the program Rinat Akhmetov – Saving Lives, for many years, the Foundation has been implementing large-scale projects aiming to provide systematic support to public healthcare.

=== Fighting COVID-19 in Ukraine ===
In February 2020, in the framework of the program Rinat Akhmetov – Saving Lives, the Foundation created a project Fighting COVID-19 in Ukraine. Rinat Akhmetov spent ₴500 million to fight the coronavirus. This is the largest contribution of one philanthropist to the public healthcare sector of Ukraine over the time of the country's independence.

=== #ThankDoctors ===
In the midst of the COVID-19 pandemic, the Foundation together with Ukraine TV channel launched a special national project #ThankDoctors. Its main goal is to tell the public about the daily feats of doctors fighting for the lives of their patients affected by COVID-19.

=== 200 Ambulances for Ukraine ===
In early July 2019, on the personal decision of Rinat Akhmetov, the Foundation began the implementation of a large-scale project 200 Ambulances for Ukraine. Within the project's framework, public healthcare facilities in all the regions of the country received specially configured vehicles. Their fleet included vehicles of three configurations: ambulances for adult patients, resuscitation vehi-cles for new-borns and off-road or cross-country ambulance vehicles designed to run in moun-tainous areas and hard-to-reach settlements. These 200 special-purpose vehicles will enable doctors to save more than one million people annually.

=== #RAKNEVYROK ===
In early October 2021, the Foundation together with VOGUE magazine and with the support from TSUM Kyiv shopping centre launched a project #RAKNEVYROK. Its main task is to show, using the example of real-life stories of its heroines, that life after the di-agnosis is possible and cancer can definitely be defeated. #RAKNEVYROK became a continua-tion of the program CANCER CAN BE CURED that the Foundation launched in 2008. It became the first and largest program in Ukraine to provide help to adult cancer patients. In particular, this help included the purchase of some diagnostic equipment for cancer clinics in Ukraine, the purchase of equipment for complex surgical operations, the launch of a mobile women's health consultation, and much more. In the framework of the program, the Foundation helped to save one million lives of Ukrainians. Almost one-fourth of all Ukrainian citizens have access to modern diagnostic equipment the Foundation provided to public healthcare institutions in the country

=== Mobile Women's Health Consultation ===
In 2012, the Rinat Akhmetov Foundation purchased and equipped accordingly a mobile health diagnostics complex unique for Ukraine. The Mobile Women's Health Consultation for the National Cancer Institute is a specially configured 18-meter long vehicle built according to a European model to be used for comprehensive examination of women's reproductive system organs. This mobile clinic has two specialized rooms – a gynaecology room (with an ultrasonic diagnostics de-vice, a colposcope, and equipment for collecting cytological material) and a mammology room where women undergo mammography (breast X-ray examination). On February 4, 2022, the Foundation and the National Cancer Institute signed a Memorandum of Cooperation to join their efforts for higher level of cancer prevention and diagnostics in Ukraine.

=== Target Assistance ===
This first systematic program of the Foundation became operational in January 2006 and aimed at supporting people who found themselves in difficult life circumstances and in need of urgent medical treatment. Often such help to a particular person grew into broader assistance to entire institutions. Many of the Foundation's activity areas have grown out of this program. They then developed into separate projects and are now part of the program Rinat Akhmetov for Children. These are the projects Rehabilitation of Injured Children, Medications for Children, Healthy Heart, and I Can Hear Now.

=== Program Rinat Akhmetov – Here to Help ===
The Foundation's largest program Rinat Akhmetov – Here to Help was launched in 2014. Its aim is to help civilians from Donbas affected by the armed conflict. According to a survey of the Foundation's social impact conducted by the British company Envoy Partnership, this program helped three and a half million people survive and prevented the humanitarian catastrophe in Donbas.

=== The Museum of Civilian Voices ===
In July 2021, the Foundation opened the first and only Museum of Civilian Voices in Ukraine to date (web site: civilvoicesmuseum.org). It is an unprecedented online project documenting the fate of ordinary people affected by the armed conflict in Donbas. Its goal is to document accounts or stories of the armed conflict's eyewitnesses as fully and impartially as possible. For now, the Museum has collected 13,000 personal stories. The goal is to collect and preserve 100,000 such stories by 2025.

=== Program Rinat Akhmetov for Children ===
On November 16, 2001, Rinat Akhmetov visited pupils of boarding schools and orphanages for the first time. This date is considered the starting date of the annual Campaign Rinat Akhmetov for Children. Since 2008, the Foundation has been consistently working on the prevention of orphanhood and has become a leader in national child adoption. Overall, more than five million children received support under the program Rinat Akhmetov for Children.

=== Healthy Heart ===
Since 2013, the Foundation has been helping children diagnosed with heart disease, and in 2017, this area developed into a separate project Rinat Akhmetov for Children. Healthy Heart. The Foundation cooperates with the country's leading clinics. Doctors remedy the disease by means of a special implant – an occluder. This is the most modern and non-traumatic method of treatment after which a young patient can be released home in a few days. In addition, the project itself enabled doctors to master modern methods of heart disease treatment. To date, 126 operations have been performed.

=== I Can Hear Now ===
The Foundation has been helping children with hearing impairments since 2007. The project Rinat Akhmetov for Children. I Can Hear Now has been active since 2018. Thanks to the project, more than 200 boys and girls received high-sensitivity hearing aids (earphones) adaptable to children's individual needs. These devices allow them to develop in a full-fledged manner and be on par with their healthy peers.

=== Rehabilitation of Injured Children ===
In March 2016, the Foundation launched a project Rehabilitation of Injured Children. Thanks to it, children with severe injuries were able to undergo rehabilitation in the best sanatoriums of Ukraine: to rest and recover physically and psychologically according to individually picked rehabilitation methods. For some children, this process takes several years, and for many of them, recovery after an injury is a lifelong challenge. The Foundation arranged 139 courses of rehabilitative treatment for children that received injuries.

=== Peaceful Summer ===
The Foundation also provides psychological support for children from Donbas. In 2015, it launched a project Rinat Akhmetov for Children. Peaceful Summer. Within its framework, almost 4,500 children from Donetsk and Luhansk regions underwent health recovery and recuperation courses in summer camps. The emphasis in the children's program was on psychological rehabilitation. Boys and girls participating in the program were taught to deal with their fears and mitigate anxiety

=== Your Superpower ===
The project Your Superpower is a series of motivational meetings between famous and successful people and boarding schoolers or orphanage pupils. The goal of the project is to help children left without parental care discover their talents that would allow them to be successful and happy. Since December 2018, 10 ambassadors of the Rinat Akhmetov Foundation have held 41 motivational meetings in nine boarding schools of the Donetsk region. More than 1,000 children attended the meetings. In December 2021, the Foundation conducted a motivational online lesson Your Superprofession. More than 5,000 viewers watched the lesson broadcast. Thus, the motivational online lesson attracted the largest number of viewers and set the national record of Ukraine. In January 2022, the Foundation released the second season of its educational series Your Superprofession. This series is a new online format of the project that is primarily targeted at teenagers who need to invest a lot of effort in this life to realize their potential in a professional domain.

=== No to Orphanhood! ===
The program No to Orphanhood! began its activities on June 1, 2008. In its framework, the national child adoption portal Rinat Akhmetov for Children. No to Orphanhood! has been operating for more than a decade now.(website: sirotstvy.net) The Foundation helped create 41 family-type orphanages that have adopted more than 400 children across the country. Thanks to the program and the portal, more than 10,000 children from boarding schools and orphanages have found happiness in new families.

=== Campaign Rinat Akhmetov for Children ===
The Foundation's longest-running and large-scale New Year's charity tradition began on November 16, 2001. Back then, Rinat Akhmetov visited boarding schoolers and pupils of children's orphanages for the first time. About one million children received gifts in the last 14 years.

== Online projects ==
=== Communication Without Barriers ===
In 2019, the Foundation launched an online project Communication Without Barriers. It is aimed primarily at people without any hearing problems and will teach them not to be afraid of or ashamed to communicate with people who have hearing impairments.

=== Ask Dad ===
In 2020, the Foundation together with Ukraine TVchannel presenter Maksym Sikora launched a digital project Ask Dad. It is a video blog for orphaned boys and children raised without a father. Children receive answers to questions that are of interest for everyone, as well as advice that dads in two-parent families give to their children.

=== Quarantine: Online Services for Teachers ===
The Foundation and the Ministry of Digital Transformation of Ukraine have created a joint special-purpose project for Ukrainian teachers – an educational series Quarantine: Online Services for Teachers. The project is a series of video courses helping teachers to master some advanced tools of distance learning based on online services, such as Google Classroom, Microsoft Teams, Cisco Webex, Zoom, Class Dojo and Classtime. These tools open up a whole range of opportunities that make teaching and learning online as modern, convenient and comprehensible as possible.

=== Educational Series Digital Physical Education for Schoolchildren with the Participation of Sports Stars ===
Jointly with the Ministry of Digital Transformation of Ukraine and Shakhtar Football Club, the Foundation presented an educational series Digital Physical Education for Schoolchildren with the Participation of Sports Stars. The purpose of the educational series was to motivate schoolchildren isolated from their schoolmates due to the COVID lockdown to do sports individually and follow a healthy lifestyle. The educational series consists of 12 physical education lessons that will be conducted by famous football players. The lessons are conducted by the players of Shakhtar football club – the team's captain Andriy Pyatov and centre-back player Serhiy Kryvtsov. The performers of the comedy TV project Mamahohotala Show Oleh Maslyuk and Yevhen Yanovych also took part in the series.

In 2021, the Foundation received a number of prestigious awards. In particular, the educational project Digital Physical Education, which is part of the project Fighting COVID-19 in Ukraine, won in two categories of a prestigious international award IPRA Golden World Awards. It also received three gold awards and two silver awards in the reputable European Digital Impact Awards, as well as became a finalist in the international Corporate Engagement Awards.

=== COVID-19: What You Need to Know About the Work of Ventilators ===
Together with the Ministry of Digital Transformation of Ukraine and the Association of Anaesthesiologists of Ukraine, the Foundation created a series COVID-19: What You Need to Know About the Work of Ventilators. This general overview series in the format of a mini-interview explains how lung ventilators work, describes the functionality of this equipment's modern models, and gives an idea of how a person feels when connected to the device, as well as what doctors do with a patient and why.

== Completed projects and programs ==
Since 2005, the Rinat Akhmetov Foundation has been implementing national-level projects aimed at addressing social challenges of the Ukrainian society. The Foundation has a pool of about 70 projects and programs in the field of healthcare, education and culture. Most of the Foundation's projects are permanent or long-run initiatives. They are based on the experience the Foundation gained during the implementation of

== More projects ==
=== Health of the Nation ===
- STOP TB Project. Stop TB in Ukraine program with the financial support of the Global Fund (2007–2009); project mission was to introduce changes in the regulatory framework of Ukraine to create conditions and mechanisms for TB doctors to provide high-quality diagnostics and treatment. A five-year regional program "Fighting TB Epidemic in Donetsk Region in 2007 – 2011" was launched within the framework of the national project Stop TB on May 31, 2007. The program was initiated by the Foundation for Development of Ukraine, Donetsk Region Council and Donetsk Regional State Administration with the goal to reduce TB morbidity and mortality in Donetsk region. In 2010 the Foundation became the main recipient of the Global Fund aimed to reduce the burden of tuberculosis in Ukraine.
  Information campaign has the goal to increase the awareness of population re tuberculosis diagnostics and preventive measures. The telephone hotline has been set up to provide the population with answers to all tuberculosis-related questions. The information campaign also included different voluntary actions, seminars-trainings and journalistic publication contests, visits to penitentiary institutions.
- Cancer can be cured. Timely cancer diagnostics and treatment in Ukraine. The project Cancer Can Be Cured. Timely Cancer Diagnostics and Treatment was initiated by the President of Foundation for Development of Ukraine on July 10, 2008. The goal is to introduce the global standards in cancer diagnostics and treatment in Ukraine, specifically for cancer patients in eight oblasts of Western Ukraine.
- UNIAN -Zdorovye. The project was launched in May 2007. The goal of the project was to provide access to the latest news in health and medicine; unite doctors seeking self-education and self-organization, and promote a careful attitude to health. The project includes an information web page at the UNIAN website, as well as an e-version disseminated free of charge. The sections of the source cover international, Ukrainian and regional medical news, statistics, research results, issue-related columns, useful information, links, recommendations and announcements. The information is updated on a real-time basis. The newsletter is issued daily; the average visit statistics are over 6,000 people per day.

=== Contemporary education ===
- Digital Future of Journalism, was launched in 2007 with the timeline 2007–2014 and is being implemented in partnership with the National University of Kyiv-Mohyla Academy. The Project Goal is to train journalists ready to adopt the digital culture and develop their editorial offices to match international media trends.
- PhD Program in Mass Communications, launched on October 1, 2008, with the timeline 2008–2012. The program targets to train scientific and educational staff with the highest education degree following the pattern of the third cycle of European Higher Education Area based on so-called Salzburg Principles.
- Foster care promotion and family building, launched on June 1, 2008, to promote national adoption and to support foster families and family-type orphanages, including granting material aid; cooperates with orphanage schools to prevent social orphanhood. The first national portal on adoption Say No to Orphanhood (Sirotstvy.net)
- Large families. The project was launched in 2008 with the goal to provide housing to all registered large families in the Autonomy Republic of Crimea; Donetsk, Zakarpattye, and Luhansk oblasts with over 10 underage children by January 1, 2009, and to establish a social partnership between the government, the businesses, and the family.

=== Cultural Heritage ===
- Reconstruction of the Metropolitan's House in the National Sanctuary "Sophia of Kyiv", 2008 with the goal to accomplish full-scale reconstruction of the Metropolitan's House, and to help Sophia of Kyiv to establish contacts with world museums to carry out joint cultural events in the Metropolitan's House.
- Reconstruction Museum in Pirogovo Village. In 2008 the Fund of Rinat Akhmetov "Development of Ukraine" allocated funds to develop infrastructure of the Museum of Folk Architecture and Life Pyrohiv and the restoration of individual museum exhibits.
- Grant Programme I³ (idea – impulse – innovation). The grants were awarded in the following cultural areas: visual art, theatre art, literature, museum business, cultural education(involving participants from different regions of the country in the project).

=== Other projects ===
- E-health (telemedicine)
- Journalism of the Digital Future
- Project in support of museums Dynamic Museum
- Target Assistance
- Help in Emergency
- Mongrel Dog
- INVATAXI: Specialized Taxi Service for the Disabled
- Insulin Project
- First Aid Kits
- Expectant Mothers’ Sets
- Mobile Distribution Teams
- Stories of Civilians
- Supporting Donetsk Regional Medical Clinical Association
- Supporting Donetsk Regional Tumor Treatment Center
- War Through the Eyes of Children
- Children Food Packages
- Mentorship
- Donbas and Civilians Photo Book
- Medications for Children
- Ukrainian Families with Many Children
- Preserving the Family for a Child
- Mural
- A Family for a Child
- Evacuation and Settlement
- Installation of Gas Service in the Village of Vilne

== Rinat Akhmetov Humanitarian Center ==
Read more: Rinat Akhmetov Humanitarian Center.

== Work during the conflict in Donbas ==
With the outbreak of the war in Donbas in 2014, the Humanitarian Center was established on the basis of the Rinat Akhmetov Foundation to help civilians affected by the war. The Center evacuated people from trouble spots, distributed humanitarian food packages and helped treat and rehabilitate the injured. As of May 2017, more than a million Donbas residents received assistance from the Humanitarian Center.

=== The Foundation's activity during the Russian invasion of Ukraine ===
On February 26, the Foundation's Founder Rinat Akhmetov donated UAH 150 million for help: “Ukraine is in trouble and each of us is doing everything we can in order to help our country. I helped, I am helping and will continue to help the people of Ukraine”.

Later, in early March, he said that Russia is the aggressor and Putin is a war criminal. In addition, he stressed that the Foundation will be helping people survive by supplying food and medicines, and SCM businesses will be helping the Ukrainian Army defend the country's sovereignty.

From February 24 to June 1, 2022, it was reported that the Foundation, Rinat Akhmetov's businesses and FC Shakhtar donated UAH 2.4 billion to help Ukraine.

=== The Foundation's help during the Russian invasion ===
As of June 3, 2022, the Foundation provided more than 600,000 units of medicines, more than 60,000 blood transfusion bags and over 187,000 food packages for Ukrainian people. Since the beginning of the full-scale war, the Foundation has also rendered psychological support to internally displaced persons from zones of military hostilities. Its emergency psychological support points operate in Zaporizhzhia, Lviv and Uzhhorod. Since February 24, 2022, more than 1,480 people have received the psychological assistance.

== Targeted Assistance and Assistance in Emergencies ==
The Project was established to cover expensive and complex treatment courses, including treatment of children, which cannot be totally funded by the state and the national budget. Assistance in emergencies project is to provide help to those who suffered from natural and manmade disasters. Support was rendered to victims and people whose relatives died in the blasts in Dnipropetrovsk, at Zasyadko, Krasnolimanskaya, Karl Marx, Duvannaya coal mines.
