= Museum of Civilian Voices =

Museum in Kyiv, Ukraine

- Established: June 6, 2014; 12 years ago
- Location: Kyiv, Ukraine
- Type: Historical museum
- Website: https://civilvoicesmuseum.org

Museum of Civilian Voices is the world's largest archive of personal stories and a source of truth about the war in Ukraine directly from eyewitnesses. The Museum collects, preserves, and documents the stories of people who have experienced the consequences of war from 2014 to the present day.

The project concept was developed with the participation of renowned Ukrainian and international museum experts. The Museum was created according to the manifesto of the famous Turkish writer, winner of the Nobel Prize in Literature, Orhan Pamuk. The writer proclaims that the task of museums of the present and the future is to tell stories not about the state, but about the individual.

The Museum aims to preserve the memory of the war in Ukraine and document Russian war crimes for future trials against the aggressor country to establish justice. For several years, the Museum only operated online. At civilvoicesmuseum.org, the stories of civilians were available in the form of video, audio recordings, and text. By the end of 2025, the archive of the Museum of Civilian Voices by the Rinat Akhmetov Foundation already contains over 140 thousand firsthand stories.

== History ==
The idea of establishing the Museum of Civilian Voices arose in response to the 2014 Russian occupation of Crimea and the military operations in Eastern Ukraine. While providing humanitarian aid to those affected by the conflict, the Rinat Akhmetov Foundation collected thousands of personal accounts which later formed the basis for the creation of a digital archive.

In 2020, the Museum collected testimonies from civilians affected by the fighting in the Donetsk region and Luhansk regions. The project concept was developed with the participation of renowned Ukrainian and international museum experts.

After the start of the Russian invasion in February 2022, the Museum began documenting new civilian testimonies.

In 2024, the Museum expanded its activities and went offline, presenting the multimedia space of the Museum of Civilian Voices as part of the 'VOICES' exhibition. It was held at the Kyiv History Museum with an art installation by Gogolfest. Also, as part of the exhibition, the animated short film 'Mariupol: One Hundred Nights' was presented. Over 5,000 people visited the exhibition in three months. For its work and significant contribution to the preservation of Ukraine's national memory, the Museum of Civilian Voices received a certificate of gratitude from the Ministry of Culture and Strategic Communications. The ‘VOICES’ exhibition has also been recommended for display in Europe and the USA.

The documentary project 'War Diaries: Voices of Survivors and Those Who Did Not Survive' was presented in the space of the Museum of Civilian Voices in Kyiv in 2024. It is based on the diaries of Kateryna Savenko and Volodymyr Velychko from Mariupol, which were donated to the Museum.

By the end of 2025, the Museum had collected over 140,000 stories. This made it the world's largest archive of testimonies from people affected by war.

== International activities ==
The Museum of Civilian Voices is also actively working to popularize the stories of civilians who witnessed or were victims of war events through international platforms. The Museum organizes thematic events in European countries and Ukraine with the participation of world experts, conducts interviews with historians, artists, and specialists in the field of national memory preservation, collaborates with foreign universities in the fields of education and science, and supports documentary filmmakers. In particular, the diary of Kateryna Savenko, presented as part of the documentary project 'War Diaries: Voices of Survivors and Those Who Did Not Survive' has been translated into German and Spanish. All of this contributes to a better understanding of the experiences of Ukrainians who survived the horrors of war.

== Partners of the Museum ==
- USC Shoah Foundation (USA)- The Shoah Foundation Institute for Visual History and Education, founded by American director, producer, and screenwriter Steven Spielberg, is a non-profit organization dedicated to creating audiovisual interviews with survivors and witnesses of the Holocaust and other genocides.
- The Oral History Association (USA) is a professional association of oral historians and others interested in advancing the practice and use of oral history. Although it is based in the United States, it has an international membership.
- Taras Shevchenko National University of Kyiv (Ukraine) is a higher education institution located in Kyiv.
- Maria Curie-Skłodowska University in Lublin is the largest university in Eastern Poland.
- The Museum of the History of the City of Kyiv is the largest museum association in the capital, consisting of 9 branch museums. The museum presents historical, artistic, and educational projects and various aspects of the city's history, literature, science, art, and socio-political life.

== Projects of the Museum ==
- 'Civilian Voices. One day 2014' is a project, which has been launched as part of the Museum of Civilian Voices to preserve the witness accounts of the day the war broke out.
- Photobook 'Donbas and Civilians' is a unique publication that was presented in Kyiv in 2018. The photo book contains the stories of the heroes of the Museum of Civilian Voices. The heroes of this book are 11 civilians of the Donbas who found themselves in the epicenter of armed conflict. The book was presented in Kyiv and Brussels, Lviv, London, Frankfurt am Main, Strasbourg, Mariupol, and Zaporizhzhia. It was nominated as the Ukrainian Library Fund's Best Social Photo Book of the Year. The English-language version of the photo book is also available for free in major national libraries across European countries.
- 'Civilian Voices. Civilian Roses' is a project of the Museum of Civilian Voices, implemented in 2020. The Rinat Akhmetov Foundation was the first in Ukraine to initiate the laying of the Rose Avenue in cities that have become a "second home" for civilians in Donbas. Each Alley is laid down together with the internally displaced persons and becomes a place of power for them. One thousand rose bushes were planted in Zaporizhzhia and Mariupol. Also, the Rinat Akhmetov Foundation engaged the children participating in the project Peaceful Summer to plant the Rose Alley in Sviatohirsk. In 2021, new Rose Alleys will appear on the map of Ukraine, in Vinnytsia, and Kharkiv cities. The planted flowers symbolize the stories of civilians, whose lives the war divided into "before" and "after".
- 'Civilian Voices. Children' project was designed in 2021 for children and teenagers who are ready to share their stories with the Museum of Civilian Voices, while learning video blogging through informative master classes, taking part in interesting contests, and engaging in exciting activities.
- 'Civilian Voices. Trauma of war' is a project implemented within the framework of the Museum of Civilian Voices. It was created to bring together people in need of psychological help with qualified psychologists from the Rinat Akhmetov Foundation in order to overcome the consequences of war. Psychologists provide support to the war-affected civilians by conducting online consultations, individual and group counselling sessions. As far back as in 2014, the Rinat Akhmetov Foundation was the first to give a helping hand to Donbas residents. Two hundred fifty psychologists were trained by the Foundation in the War Trauma training programme. As a result, more than one million Ukrainians received psychological support by the beginning of 2025.
- 'Civilian Voices. Interview' is a series of candid and heartfelt video stories from the people of Donbas about how the military conflict in eastern Ukraine has changed their lives, both before and after. These are stories of how, despite the war, the loss of their homes, jobs, and loved ones, the heroes kept hope, did not lose faith in themselves, and were able to build a new life virtually from scratch.
- 'The Forum of Oral History of Ukraine' is an event initiated by the Museum of Civilian Voices. The event brought together Ukrainian and global documentary initiatives, creating an international professional community that continues to exchange ideas and experiences on documenting the events of the war.
- '1000 Days. Thousands of Stories' is a special project of the Museum of Civilian Voices, which reminds the world of the war in the center of Europe. This collection includes 20 significant milestones of the 1,000 days of full-scale war. The first day of the invasion, the invasion of the Kyiv region, millions of refugees, the Mariupol tragedy, the abduction of Ukrainian children, the Bakhmut fortress, the liberation of Kherson, and the destruction of the Kakhovka Dam — these and other events are shown through the fates of Ukrainians whose stories are presented in the Museum of Civilian Voices.
- The 'Essay Competition' is a national project initiated by the Museum of Civilian Voices, which gives young people's voices the opportunity to be heard throughout Ukraine and the world, telling about the war, love for the motherland, confidence in victory and firm belief in a peaceful future.

== Joint projects, implemented with partners ==
The theatre performance 'Faces of the Colour of War' is a story based on the memories of actors who managed to escape from the temporarily occupied Mariupol. The plot is based on the stories of the heroes of the Museum of Civilian Voices. The play will premiere on July 28, 2022, at the Theater on Podil in Kyiv. The main goal of the project is to remind the world of the Mariupol tragedy and to revive the work of its artists.

The documentary film 'Dram' was made by director and producer Yulian Ulybin in cooperation with the Museum of Civilian Voices. One of the film's protagonists, Liza, entrusted her story to the museum, which then passed it on to the film team. The film was presented at the 14th Odesa International Film Festival in 2023.

The short film 'Mariupol Survivors' won the Best International Film category at the annual Santa Fe Film Festival. The film includes fragments of three stories from the archives of the Museum of Civilian Voices, which tell the story of the tragedies experienced by the people of Mariupol.

The documentary '20 Days in Mariupol' was made by a Ukrainian team consisting of war correspondent, AP videographer, and director Mstyslav Chernov, photojournalist Yevhen Malolietka, and producer Vasilisa Stepanenko. In 2024, the film won an Oscar in the Best Documentary category. The film is based on the events in Mariupol in March 2022. The medics who saved lives during the blockade of the city entrusted their stories to the Museum of Civilian Voices.

== Awards ==
In 2022, the Museum of Civilian Voices won The Drum Awards for Social Purpose in the Best Response to Change category!

In 2023, the International Public Relations Association (IPRA) announced the winners of the IPRA Golden World Awards — a prestigious international award in the field of public relations. The Museum of Civilian Voices won in all three categories in which it became a finalist: • Community engagement; • Country, region and city; • NGO campaign.

Also, in 2023, the Museum of Civilian Voices by the Rinat Akhmetov Foundation became a member of the Oral History Association (OHA) — an international oral history association based in Waco, Texas, USA.
