= Iryna Zolotarevych =

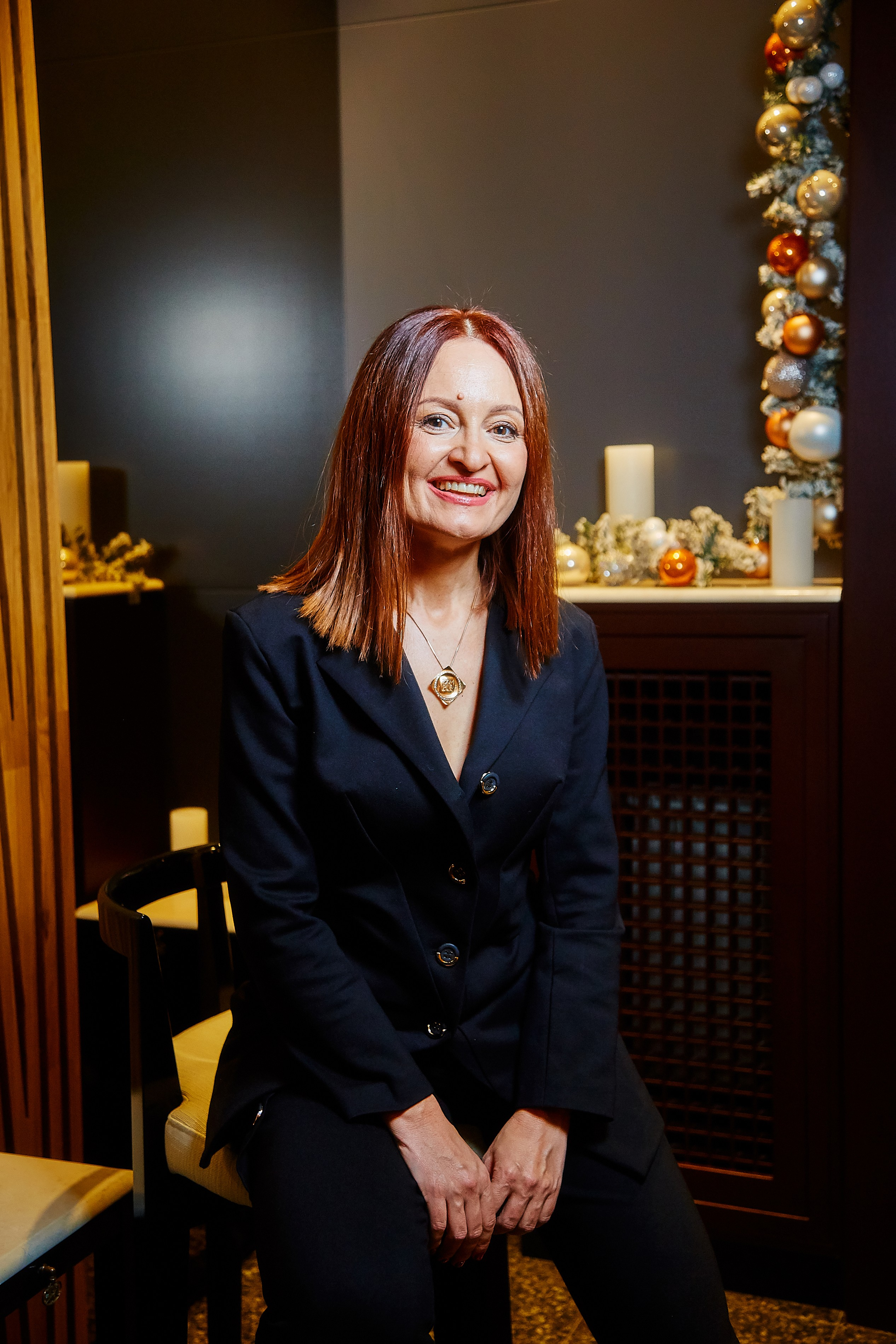
- Occupations: Communications expert, social activist, author
- Organization(s): PR&GR Services Director at AGAMA communications, Co-founder of World Communication Forum Davos Association

Iryna Zolotarevych is a Ukrainian communications expert and social activist.

== Biography ==
In 2007, Iryna Zolotarevych helped establish Detki-Monetki, an international project aimed at improving financial literacy among children. Zolotarevych has co-written four books on entrepreneurship, as well as a school textbook on financial literacy.

From 2011 to 2015, she was the director of the Pleon Talan Communications Agency. She and her team won the Effie Ukraine award for their work on the Babyn Yar digital communication project at the IPRA Golden World Awards.

In 2014, Zolotarevych co-founded the World Communications Forum Davos branch in Kyiv, and she remains a member of the World Communications Forum Association (WCFA) Executive Board.

In 2015, she launched a new agency in AGAMA Communications' portfolio called GROU, specializing in public affairs, public relations and reputation management. As a UAPR board member, Zolotarevych chaired the organizing committee of the Pravda Awards PR, contest and has supervised the 'UAPR for Students' program.

Zolotarevych has often been invited to discuss state strategy for information society development and IT support in Ukraine. She has authored and co-authored over 100 communications lectures and trainings and lectured at the Institute of International Relations in Prague.

== Publications ==
- Person in the Center of Attention: Column by I. Zolotarevych in the Forbes Ukraine.
- The Right Words—Lessons of WCFDavos Kyiv 2015 communications: Column by I. Zolotarevych in the Capital.
- Iryna Zolotarevych: The Employer Is Not Ready to Risk—І. Zolotarevych’s column at Dengi.UA.
