= Raiffeisen Bank (Ukraine) =

Ukrainian commercial bank

PAT 'Raiffeisen Bank' ПАТ "Райффайзен Банк"
- Type: Public Joint-Stock Company
- Industry: banking, investment
- Founded: 27 March 1992; 34 years ago
- Headquarters: Kyiv, Ukraine
- Number of locations: 503 bank branches
- Total assets: ▲ ₴72.108 billion (2018.01.01)
- Owner: Raiffeisen Bank International (68.3%); European Bank for Reconstruction and Development (30%)
- Number of employees: 12,000+
- Website: www.raiffeisen.ua/en/

The Public JSC Raiffeisen Bank (Ukrainian: ПАТ "Райффайзен Банк", formerly Raiffeisen Bank Aval) is a commercial bank in Ukraine and is a subsidiary of Austrian Raiffeisen Bank International. In early 2024, it was confirmed by the National Bank of Ukraine as one of the country's systemically important banks.

As of 2018, the bank's service network included 503 branches, 2525 ATMs and 414 payment terminals. The bank has issued 4.9 million payment cards, Raiffeisen Bank also owns one of the largest networks of trading POS terminals with more than 23,000 units.

== History ==
The bank was registered on 27 March 1992, and since 2006 has been a subsidiary of Austrian Raiffeisen Bank International. In 2015 the European Bank for Reconstruction and Development acquired a 30% stake in Raiffeisen Bank Aval, increasing its capital. Raiffeisen Bank International has a stake of 68.26% in the bank.

As of 2018 the fourth-largest bank in the country and the largest bank with foreign capital. Following a government bailout of the country's largest bank at the turn of 2016 and 2017, Raiffeisen Bank Aval was the only bank in the top 5 not owned by the government of Ukraine.

It was headed from 2005 until 2019 by Volodymyr Lavrenchuk.

As of 1 January 2018, the bank's net assets amounted to more than ₴72 billion, and in terms of their size. Raiffeisen ranks third in the retail banking market in Ukraine.

In June 2021 the bank changed its name from “Raiffeisen Bank Aval” officially to “Raiffeisen Bank”.

== Banking network ==
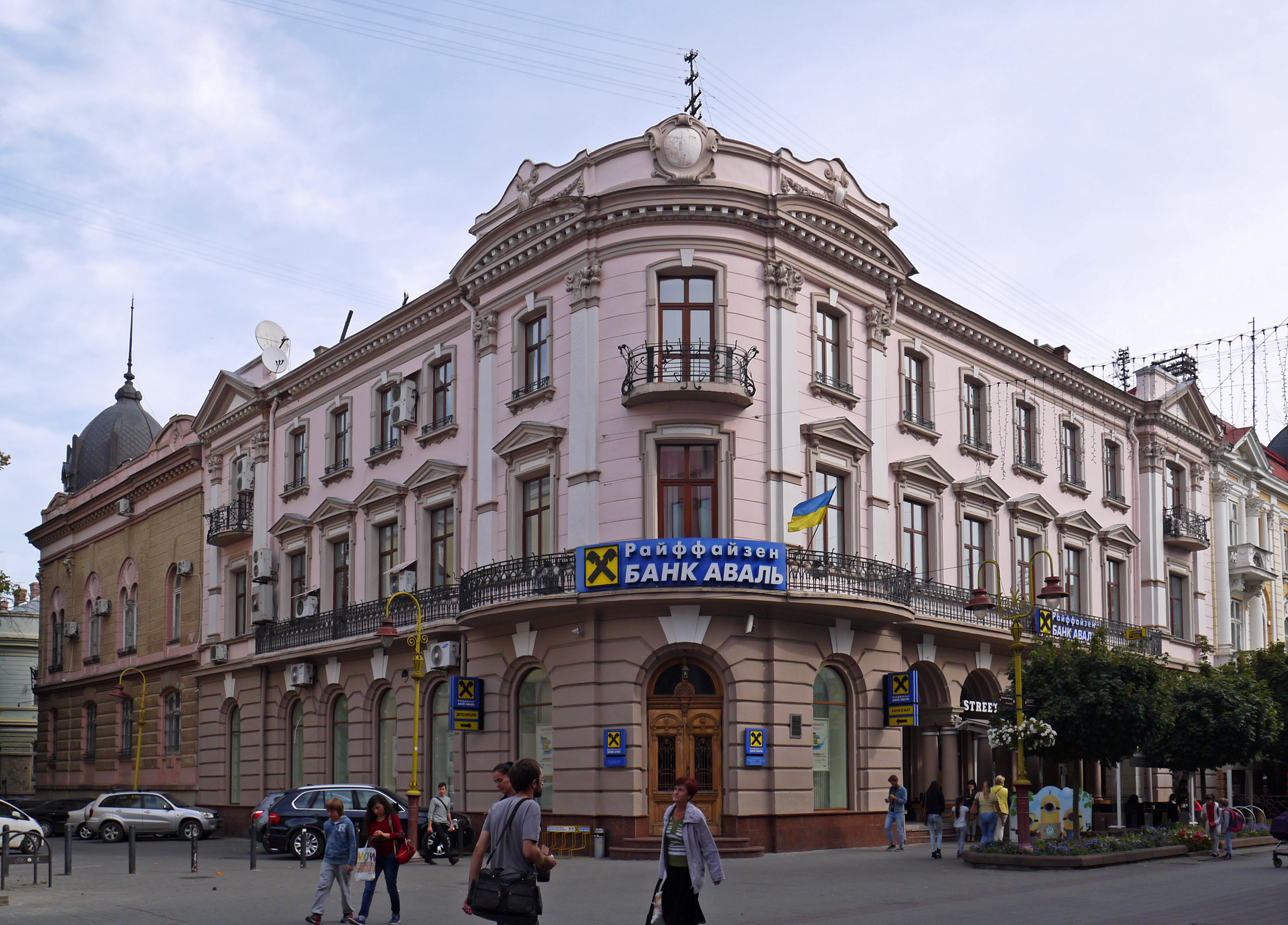
Raiffeisen Bank Aval branch in Ivano-Frankivsk

At the end of 2013, the national network included 798 operating units:

- 711 full-featured branches providing a full list of standard banking services to individuals and clients of microbusiness, small, medium and corporate businesses;
- 85 commission branches serving private clients, carrying out cash transactions;
- 2 branches serving VIP-clients.

The vast majority of Raiffeisen Bank Aval's branches were fully functional, i.e. they provide a full range of standard banking services to private and corporate clients, as well as small and micro businesses. In addition, the bank's network included commission branches on the territory of the State Customs Service of Ukraine and in representative offices / stores of MTS Ukraine, the bank's corporate client.

== See also ==
- List of banks in Ukraine
