= IPRA =

IPRA may refer to:

- Indigenous Peoples' Rights Act of 1997, a Philippine law
- International Peace Research Association, an academic organization promoting peace
- International Pragmatics Association, an academic organization
- International Professional Rodeo Association, a North American rodeo organization
- International Public Relations Association, the organization that confers the IPRA Golden World Awards
