= Caucasus Cable System =

- Owners: Caucasus Online
- Landing points: Balchik (Bulgaria); Poti (Georgia)
- Total length: 1,182km
- Topology: 2 × 2 fibers
- Design capacity: 1.92Tb/s
- Currently lit capacity: 12.6Tb/s
- Technology: repeatered DWDM
- Date of first use: 21 November 2008
- Website: http://www.blackseacable.com/

The Caucasus Cable System (unofficially also designated as the Bulgaria–Georgia communications cable) is a Georgian-owned submarine communications cable in the Black Sea linking Poti, Georgia to Balchik, Bulgaria over a distance of 1,182 km. Its landing station in Balchik is connected to Frankfurt, Germany and other European Internet hubs via terrestrial connection. As the only communications cable linking Georgia directly to Europe, the Caucasus Cable System is deemed of geostrategic importance and has been at the center of controversy due to alleged plans to sell it to a Russian-owned company. As of January 2017 the cable is still in sole ownership of Caucasus Online.

== Construction ==
Laying works were completed in July 2008 by the American cable ship CS Tyco Decisive, just a couple of weeks prior to the South Ossetia War. The submarine cable was manufactured and laid by TE Connectivity and consists of two fiber pairs each carrying 96 wavelengths with a bandwidth of 100 Gbit/s providing a total bandwidth of 12.8 Tbit/s (originally 64 × 10 Gbit/s and a total of 1.2 Tbit/s). In 2011 an upgrade implemented by TE Connectivity enabled the addition of further wavelengths.

The project was led by Georgia's largest Internet service provider, Caucasus Online. Costs of construction of the submarine cable amounted to $40 million of which $35 million were funded by loans acquired from the European Bank for Reconstruction and Development (EBRD). As part of the deal, the EBRD acquired a 5.0% equity stake in the company.

The project involved further investments for terrestrial fibre optic infrastructure from and to the landing stations worth $22 million. On the Bulgarian side a fibre optic link to Varna was built while on the Georgian end a fibre optic link to Georgian neighbour Azerbaijan was laid.

Completion of the project was delayed by around one month due to the 2008 Russo-Georgian diplomatic crisis.

== Russian sale scandal ==
In February 2016, the Georgian political party Free Democrats blew the whistle on what it claimed were secret negotiations between Caucasus Online and a subsidiary of the Russian company VimpelCom on the sale of Caucasus Cable System to the latter. Commentators expressed grave concern that the transfer of such a strategic communications channel to a Russian firm would jeopardize Georgia's national security and give increased cyber access to the Russian intelligence services. Caucasus Online admitted to partial sale negotiations with VimpelCom, but claimed the submarine cable was not part of the deal. In an apparent effort to downplay the Russian security threats, Caucasus Online director Giorgy Tkeshelashvili added that VimpelCom was an internationally traded company involving people of many different nationalities. Free Democrats maintained that secret negotiations on the fate of the cable were planned in Turkey between Caucasus Online and VimpelCom subsidiaries.

== Azerbaijan sale scandal ==
The sole owner of the cable is Caucasus Online. 49% of the company was sold in 2019 to Negsol Holding, owned by Azerbaijani businessman Nasib Hasanov, for $ 61 million. In March 2021, Nexol Holding acquired the remaining 51% of the Georgian Internet provider Caucasus Online and became a 100% owner. Although the material value of the contract is unknown, the agreement has been sharply criticized by the Georgian National Communications Commission. Kakha Bekauri, the head of the GNCC, said that the deal had not been approved in advance by the commission, so it was illegal and should be annulled.

== See also ==
- Baku–Tbilisi–Ceyhan pipeline
