= Church of Sts. Florus and Laurus, Pirogovo =

Church building in Pirogovo, Russia

The Church of Sts. Florus and Laurus
- Церковь Флора и Лавра
- Interactive map of the The Church of Sts. Florus and Laurus area

General information
- Location: Pirogovo
- Coordinates: 56°15′56″N 61°57′40″E
- Construction started: 1832

The Church of Sts. Florus and Laurus is an Orthodox church in Pirogovo village, Sverdlovsk Oblast.

The building was granted the status of regional significance on 28 December 2001 (the Sverdlovsk Oblast Government Decree № 859). The object number of cultural heritage of regional significance is 661710759330005.

== History ==
The construction works started in 1832. The southern side-altar was consecrated in the name of St. Basil the Great on 7 February 1835, and the main church was consecrated in the name of the martyrs Florus and Laurus on 7 September 1841. In 1869 the construction of the northern side-altar was started. The side-altar was consecrated on 25 January 1871 in the name of Saint Nicholas.

In 1937 the church was closed. It was returned to the Russian Orthodox Church only in 1991. The church has been undergoing restoration since 2003.

== Architecture ==
The three-dimensional composition of the building is centric, in the form of a stepped pyramid. In the center of the cross shape of the church there is a two-light temple quadrangle. It is covered by four slopes with a curvilinear roof with lucarnes on the sides and a light lantern at the top. The sides of the quadrilateral are joined by rectangular forms. They are organized as branches of the cross shape construction: the eastern branch of the cross is intended for the main altar; the northern and southern branches of the cross are side-altars. The dimensional form of the western branch of the cross is higher than the others. It serves as the porch and the base for the bell tower. The cylindrical dimension of the bell tower is cut by four arches. It has a square base (pedestal) and is covered by a dome with a spire.

The facade decoration of the church is simple. The walls of the altar and chapels are without decorative elements, only the tall windows and niches located above them are their surface. The planes of the temple quadrangle's facades are cut in the center by triple windows, at the corners they are fixed with pylons and completed vertically by a cornice plate on modillions. The forms of decorative details on the facades (modillions, archivolts) are simplified and distorted by handicraft execution. The type of the four-edged "cubed" roof by the lucarnes is borrowed from the architecture of temples of the Baroque period. The interior space of the temple is divided into separate rooms by triple arcades installed in the span of the girth arches. The cloistered vault in the center of the church and the cylindrical vaults in the neighboring rooms rest on the walls and Greek-cross plan form.

== Literature ==
- Свод памятников истории и культуры Свердловской области. Vol. 2. Екатеринбург: Сократ. 2008. p. 648. ISBN 978-5-88664-323-7 – via ред. В.Е.Звагельская.
- Бурлакова Н.Н. (2011). Забытые храмы Свердловской области. Екатеринбург: Сократ. pp. 128–129. ISBN 978-5-88664-395-4.
- Приходы и церкви Екатеринбургской епархии. Екатеринбург: Братство Св. Праведного Симеона Верхотурского Чудотворца. 1902. p. 647.
