= .ge =

Internet country-code top-level domain for Georgia

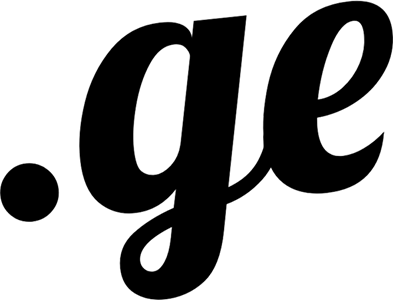
- Introduced: 2 December 1992
- TLD type: Country code top-level domain
- Status: Active
- Registry: Caucasus Online
- Sponsor: Caucasus Online
- Intended use: Entities connected with Georgia
- Actual use: Popular in Georgia
- Registration restrictions: Available to persons and companies located worldwide
- Structure: Registrations are available directly at second level as well as at third level beneath some second-level domains
- Documents: Rules and conditions
- Registry website: nic.ge

.გე
- Introduced: 20 January 2016 (open to the public on 20 July 2016)
- TLD type: Country code top-level domain
- Status: Active
- Intended use: Entities connected with Georgia, domain names preferably using the Georgian Mkhedruli script
- Registry website: xn--lodaehvb5cdik4g.xn--node

.ge is the country code top-level domain (ccTLD) for Georgia.

== Registration ==
.ge top-level domain names are available for direct registration for individuals and companies worldwide, without any restriction on citizenship or residence.

Second-level domain names are also available for registration for several specific types of registrants:

Domain	Intended purpose
.com.ge	Commercial organizations
.edu.ge	Educational institutions
.school.ge	Schools
.gov.ge	Governmental organizations
.org.ge	Non-governmental organizations
.mil.ge	Military of Georgia
.net.ge	Network provider
.pvt.ge	Individuals

== History ==
.ge was delegated to Georgian Internet service provider SaNet in 1992. In 2006 Caucasus Online has been formed after merger of 3 companies (including SaNet) and became sponsor of .ge.

Registration service was initially provided by non-profit organization Internet Development Group - Georgia, but after introduction of Caucasus Online it exclusively consolidated both administrative and registrar roles. .gov.ge was delegated to LEPL Smart Logic in 2014.

=== Registrar Companies ===
Since 16 April 2018, according to renewed regulations of Registration and administration of .GE domain, Caucasus Online administrates only the .GE country code top-level domain.

The registrar's functions and duties are exercised by registrars, accredited by Caucasus Online, who will register and manage .GE domain names; the .GE country code top level domain is registered by accredited companies.

=== Zone Statistics ===
According to official data as of October 2025, over 60,000 names are registered in the .GE domain zone. The number of active websites on .GE domains is approximately 30,000.

== .გე ==
In 2011, a new top-level domain name was registered for Georgia, intended for domain names in the local language.

The top-level domain is .გე (.xn--node), which are the Georgian letters gani and eni, representing G and E rather than an abbreviation of the nation's native name, Sakartvelo. It became active with active web sites in 2016.

Starting 20 January 2016, Georgia registered .გე top-level domains using Georgian Mkhedruli script.

At first, the process started for reservation of governmental and commercial TLDs but after 6 months from start date, registration of IDN ccTLDs became available to the general public.
