= Vitalii Malakhov =

Ukrainian theatre director (1954–2021)

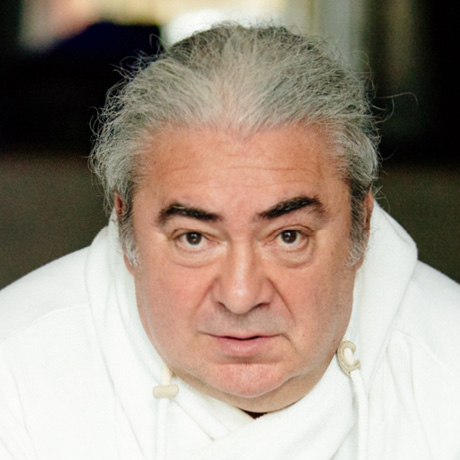
- Malakhov in 2020
- Born: 19 July 1954; Lviv, Ukrainian Soviet Socialist Republic
- Died: 4 November 2021 (aged 67); Kyiv, Ukraine
- Education: Kyiv National I. K. Karpenko-Kary Theatre, Cinema and Television University
- Occupations: Theater director, theater teacher
- Years active: 1977–2021
- Children: Daria Malakhovna

Vitalii Yukhymovych Malakhov (Ukrainian: Віта́лій Юхи́мович Мала́хов; 19 July 1954 – 4 November 2021) was a Ukrainian theatre director and artistic manager-director of the Kyiv Drama Theater on Podil. He was nominated as the People's Artist of Ukraine in 2008. He was also the laureate of the Shevchenko National Prize in the field of art in 2008.

== Biography ==
Malakhov was born on 19 July 1954 in Lviv, which was in the Ukrainian Soviet Socialist Republic. His creative career began in 1977 on Ukrainian television. He worked at the Lesya Ukrainka Russian Drama State Theatre of Kyiv from May 1978 to March 1979, which Tale of Monica was staged there by him. Since 1979, he has been the head of the Kyiv Variety State Theatre, where he staged plays I am Kyiv, Night of Miracles, The Dawn and the Death of Pablo Neruda, Unwitting Scammer and others.

From 1985 to 1987, he worked with his troupe based on the Youth Theatre of Kyiv, and in August 1987, the Kyiv Drama Theatre on Podil was created. From 1987 to 2021, he was the artistic manager and director of the Kyiv academic drama theatre on Podil, with more than 60 performances to his credit.

His troupe presented the theatre art of Ukraine in the United States, the United Kingdom, Italy, Mexico, Costa Rica, Finland, Germany, Greece, Turkey, and other countries. The Theatre on Podil, under the leadership of Malakhov, was granted academic status in 2006 for outstanding achievements in the development of Ukrainian dramatic art.

Malakhov died from sepsis and COVID-19 on 4 November 2021 in the Feofania Clinical Hospital. His farewell took place in the Theatre on Podil on 8 November.
