= Nobel Energy =

UK based oil corporation

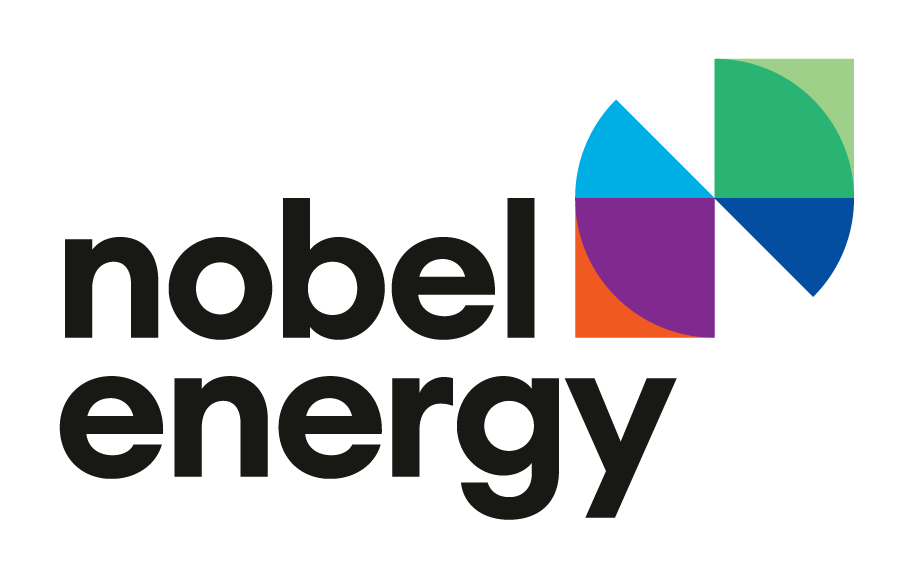

- Industry: Oil and gas, renewables
- Founded: Baku, Azerbaijan (2005)
- Headquarters: London, UK, Baku, Azerbaijan
- Number of locations: 3 – Baku, Azerbaijan; London, England; Houston, USA
- Area served: Azerbaijan, UK, USA, South America, Turkey, Georgia, Kazakhstan, UAE, India
- Key people: Nasib Hasanov (founder and owner)
- Services: Technical service provider for the oil and gas, and renewables industries
- Owner: Nasib Hasanov
- Website: www.nobelenergy.com

Nobel Energy (official name Nobel Energy Management LLC, formerly Nobel Oil Services Ltd) is a group of companies concentrated in the energy industry providing integrated engineering, construction, procurement and supply chain management, and drilling services. Nobel Energy is a part of NEQSOL Holding, an international group of companies, acting in energy, telecommunications, high-technology, and construction industries in the UK, the USA, Turkey, Azerbaijan, Ukraine, Georgia, Kazakhstan, and the UAE.

== History ==
Nobel Energy was established in 2005 by Nasib Hasanov an Azerbaijan-born businessman, as a technical service provider, offering services to the oil and gas industry in the Caspian region. These include wells’ work over, drilling, installation, construction, engineering, maintenance, repair, and operations services.

In 2007, Absheron Qazma (AQS), a subsidiary, established a joint venture with SOCAR, SOCAR AQŞ, to deliver integrated drilling and well management services.

In 2012, Nobel Energy established Global Energy Solutions (Glensol) and Prokon. Glensol’s key focus areas have been field operations and equipment maintenance services in Azerbaijan and regionally. Prokon has specialized in management of integrated infrastructure, industrial plants and facilities construction processes from design adaptation to procurement and construction.

In 2014, Nobel Energy reorganized its corporate structure to place its Azerbaijan-based businesses under a parent company headquartered in the UK and align its business processes with international standards.

In 2014, the company developed its exploration and production activities and established Llamrei DMCC, focused on procurement and trading, logistics and expediting services, as well as warehouse and materials management.

In 2015, Nobel Energy acquired 50% of Denholm Oilfield Services Limited’s fabrication business in Azerbaijan. The same year, Glensol established a JV with Denholm Valvecare Limited to provide valve maintenance services.

In 2017, Nobel Energy and its subsidiaries received “Transparent Tax Partner” status granted by the Ministry of Taxes for transparent financial performance.

In 2017, Glensol expanded its business to Kazakhstan.

In 2018, SOCAR AQS established a joint venture with KCA Deutag to provide well drilling and engineering services for the oil and gas industry.

In 2018, Nobel Energy established a joint venture with Wood for the provision of engineering, procurement and construction management services.

In 2019, Prokon and SOCAR AQS entered Turkish markets.

In 2019, Nobel Energy received a ISO 37001:2016 certification (Anti-Bribery Management System) by LRQA, Lloyds register's Business Assurance and Inspection Services division. Nobel Energy renewed the certification in 2022.

On 1 December 2021, the company announced a major rebrand, and set out a new strategy to transform the business from oil and gas services to an integrated energy production, development, and services company. The company name was changed from Nobel Oil Services to Nobel Energy.

== Operations ==
It specializes in project and construction management; fabrication and installation of structural steelwork, upgrades of offshore facilities, pipework systems including high-pressure flow lines, vessels, tanks, and related packages; field operations and equipment maintenance; integrated drilling and well services; enhanced oil recovery services; and integrated supply chain management.

=== Activities ===
- Integrated services – field operations, equipment maintenance (provided by Glensol), oil recovery services (provided by OGP)
- Engineering, Procurement and Construction (EPC, provided by Prokon) – project and construction management, engineering, procurement and construction management (EPCM), and fabrication
- EPCM – engineering, procurement and construction management domain
- Integrated Procurement and Supply Chain Management (PSCM) – procurement, trading, logistics, expediting services, warehouse management, and materials management services for the energy industry
- Drilling services (provided by SOCAR AQS and Turan Drilling & Engineering) – integrated drilling and well, engineering, and well management across the Caspian Region, and Turkey

=== Subsidiaries and affiliates ===
Nobel Energy has five subsidiaries and affiliates:

- Audubon is a US-based company providing engineering, procurement, construction (EPC), construction management (EPCM), fabrication (EPFC), consulting, and technical services for the energy, chemicals, renewables, power and utility, and industrial markets.
- Glensol (Global Energy Solutions) is specialized in an oilfield operations and equipment maintenance company.
- Prokon is specialized in the management of integrated infrastructure, industrial plants and facilities construction processes.
- Llamrei DMCC is specialized in integrated procurement and supply chain management (PSCM).
- OGP is a local company specialized in technologies, management and local expertise to the oil industry.

=== Joint ventures ===
- SOCAR AQS is an integrated drilling and well services management company, jointly established between State Oil Company of Azerbaijan Republic (SOCAR), Nobel Energy Limited and Absheron Qazma LLC (AQS).
- Turan Drilling and Engineering is established by KCA Deuteg and SOCAR AQS.
- Wood Group Azerbaijan is jointly established between Nobel Energy and Wood delivers integrated EPCM services in the Caspian region.
- SDL Nobel is jointly established between Nobel Energy and Denholm Energy Services.
- EnerMech OGP is established by EnerMech and Oil and Gas ProServ (OGP), a Nobel Energy affiliate.
- Umid Babek Operating Company (UBOC) is a joint operating company established in 2017 in partnership with SOCAR (80%) to explore and develop the Umid–Babek offshore hydrocarbon block, with Nobel Energy holding a 20% participating interest.

=== Clients ===
Among Nobel Energy's clients are SOCAR, BP, Siemens, Tüpraş, BOTAŞ, Wood, Karachaganak Petroleum Operating (KPO), Worley Parsons, Samsung Electronics, Saipem, Technip, and Biwater.
