= Rinat Akhmetov Humanitarian Center =

Ukrainian non-governmental organization

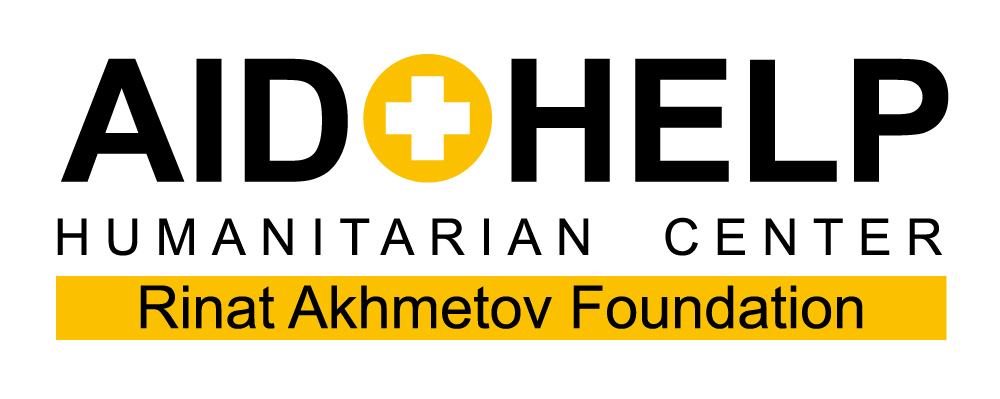
Logotype of the Humanitarian Center

The Rinat Akhmetov Humanitarian Center is the largest humanitarian mission in Ukraine, which operates in Donbas. The center was established on August 6, 2014, in order to provide assistance to the civilian population of Donetsk and Luhansk regions, affected by the war in Donbas. It united the resources of the Rinat Akhmetov Charitable Foundation, all SCM Group's business and Shakhtar Football Club.

The Humanitarian Center worked across both sides of the conflict region up until February 2017 when authorities of the Donetsk People's Republic prohibited the Humanitarian Center from operating on the territory under their control. The center continued to operate in government-controlled areas and in the "grey zone," but was forced to suspend operations in 2017 when rebels blocked access to the center's warehouses.

As of March 2018, the Humanitarian Center issued civilians more than 12 million food packages.

Till February 2017 the Humanitarian Center worked on both sides of the contact line. Since March 2017 the authorities of Donetsk People's Republic prohibited the operation of Humanitarian Center on the territory under their control. The Center continued its operation in government-controlled areas and in the "grey zone".

As of March 2018, the Humanitarian Center issued more than 12 million food packages to the peaceful inhabitants of Donbas and saved more than a million human lives.

== Foundation mission ==
In August 2014, the foundation started using the Shakhtar FC arena owned by Rinat Akhmetov. According to news reports published by the Shakhtar football club, the arena became known as the Arena of Mercy, and the center has helped save over 1 million people to date. Organisation's 2014 annual report of the Akhmetov Foundation showed that they had organised the evacuation of about 40,000 people from the conflict zone and distributed 1.35m food packages. The report also states that the Foundation espouses traditional humanitarian principles and values: ‘Our role is to fully comply with international humanitarian assistance principles that require efficiency, transparency, independence and strict neutrality’. In 2014, the Foundation's Rinat Akhmetov Humanitarian Center reported that it helped more than 710,000 people.

Since August 2014, more than 39,000 people have been evacuated from the scene of fighting by the efforts of the center, 11.7 million of adults and children have received food packages, more than 100,000 people - target medical assistance and psychological counseling. Alexander Vishnyakov, the director of the Rinat Akhmetov Humanitarian Center, on the press conference underlined that for 3 years of work, the Center saved more than 1 million civilians in the East of Ukraine from starvation disease and shelling and became the largest humanitarian mission in this territory.

== Major humanitarian programs ==
There are six main directions in the center's healthcare work: targeted medical assistance, medical kits, cardiac care, medicines for children, rehabilitation of injured children, birth kits. Psychological support is one more direction that continue working trying to help all the civilians of Donetsk and Luhansk region. 250 psychologists were trained in the "War Trauma" course at the initiative of Rinat Akhmetov Humanitarian Center. In 2014-2015 psychological support was provided to 49 000 children and 6 000 adults, the worked in specialized centers, kindergartens, schools, hospitals and public institutions.

=== Medical assistance ===
The Center provides assistance with urgent treatment and complex surgeries, rehabilitation of injured children and delivery of medications. This kind of assistance was provided to more than 30,000 people. Over time, the Foundation has focused more and more on children's health, pregnant women, retired people or orphans - they became the priority. Rinat Akhmetov Foundation offers life-saving surgeries and urgent treatments especially for children, like Healthy Hearts, to provide a quick and effective response to crucial medical needs, or like a hearing aid programme. The Center provides pharmaceuticals as insulin, anticonvulsants and asthma medications to all children under 18, living in non-government-controlled areas of Donbas, and internally displaced children who left for the peaceful territories of Donetsk and Luhansk regions.

In September 2019, 20 ambulances purchased by the Rinat Akhmetov Foundation were sent to the regions on the Day of Patient Safety at the initiative of President of Ukraine Volodymyr Zelenskyy. In general, the project, under which 200 ambulances, procured by the decision of Rinat Akhmetov, will be transferred to children's regional hospitals, ambulance stations and outpatient clinics of rural communities in all regions of Ukraine before the end of the year, was launched in June 2019.

== Humanitarian Center performance assessment ==
The Overseas Development Institute has released a new report “Humanitarian access and local organisations in Ukraine” describing the needs and response of the main humanitarian assistance actors in Donbas, Ukraine. As the most active national foundation in preventing humanitarian catastrophe in Ukraine, the Rinat Akhmetov Foundation was a major contributor to the humanitarian effort in the DPR until February 2017 when the de facto authorities closed down the foundation's network of distribution points. Local actors in Ukraine were mainly organised civilian groups, but these local actors can not match the scale and scope of international humanitarian help. The one exception to this is the Rinat Akhmetov Foundation. Created by billionaire Rinat Akhmetov, the richest man in Ukraine and one of Donbas' most prominent oligarchs, the Foundation has played a crucial role in providing aid for citizens, reacting early to the crisis and focusing on ‘hard’ activities such as the distribution of food and blankets.

After the ban of the Humanitarian Center's activities by the authorities of the Donetsk People's Republic in the territory under their control in March 2017, even Rinat Akhmetov's detractors acknowledged that his assistance was immense and indispensable, and the products from his Center actually helped the poorest inhabitants of Donetsk region to survive.

The Rinat Akhmetov Foundation's activity was highly appreciated not only in Ukraine, but also abroad. Alexander Hug, Deputy Head of the OSCE Mission in Ukraine said: "I want to express respect to those organizations that help civilians on both sides of the line of conflict. For example, the Rinat Akhmetov Foundation, whose support will ease the lives of those in need. I am glad that they continue to provide assistance".

Ivane Bochorishvili, Deputy Head of the UN Office for the Coordination of Humanitarian Affairs in Ukraine, also noted the great importance of the humanitarian activities of the Rinat Akhmetov Foundation in Donbas: "The charity foundation has been helping people from beginning of the conflict inDonbas for so many years. In addition, it exchanges information with other international organizations. It is in our interests, because we want people to get the help they really need. What the Foundation does for residents of Donbas is invaluable", Bochorishvili said.

From January 14 to 17, 2019, in the European Parliament in Strasbourg, the Rinat Akhmetov Foundation organized a unique exhibition about civilians in Donbas. The exhibition - black-and-white collages from the photo book "Donbas and Civilians", color photographs of destroyed houses and their residents, videos with the participation of children of war - attracted the attention of European deputies and representatives of the Ukrainian diplomatic community. In his greeting, Charles Tannock, the Conservative Party member of the European Parliament, noted that his parliamentary colleagues had a unique opportunity to learn about the conflict in Ukraine and how war affects the daily lives of civilians in its epicenter. Charles Tannock also called the outstanding humanitarian activities of the Rinat Akhmetov Foundation in Donbas.

In March 2019, the photobook "Donbas and Civilians" of the Rinat Akhmetov Foundation was presented at the London Book Fair as part of the Ukrainian stand.
