= Pirogovo, Belgorod Oblast =

Pirogovo Пирогово
- Selo
- Location within Belgorod Oblast Location within Russia
- Coordinates: 50°36′N 39°01′E
- Country: Russia
- Region: Belgorod Oblast
- District: Alexeyevsky District
- Time zone: UTC+3:00

Pirogovo (Russian: Пирогово) is a rural locality (a selo) in Alexeyevsky District, Belgorod Oblast, Russia. The population was 189 as of 2010. There are 4 streets.

== Geography ==
Pirogovo is located 27 km east of Alexeyevka (the district's administrative centre) by road. Vorobyovo is the nearest rural locality.
