= Pestovo, Vladimir Oblast =

Pestovo Пестово
- Village
- Location within Vladimir Oblast Location within Russia
- Coordinates: 56°12′N 41°14′E
- Country: Russia
- Region: Vladimir Oblast
- District: Kovrovsky District
- Time zone: UTC+3:00

Pestovo (Russian: Пестово) is a rural locality (a village) in Novoselskoye Rural Settlement, Kovrovsky District, Vladimir Oblast, Russia. The population was 38 as of 2010.

== Geography ==
Pestovo is located 63 km southwest of Kovrov (the district's administrative centre) by road. Anokhino is the nearest rural locality.
