= Pirogovo, Vologodsky District, Vologda Oblast =

Pirogovo Пирогово
- Village
- Location within Vologda Oblast Location within Russia
- Coordinates: 59°09′N 39°30′E
- Country: Russia
- Region: Vologda Oblast
- District: Vologodsky District
- Time zone: UTC+3:00

Pirogovo (Russian: Пирогово) is a rural locality (a village) in Sosnovskoye Rural Settlement, Vologodsky District, Vologda Oblast, Russia. The population was 7 as of 2002.

== Geography ==
Pirogovo is located 26 km southwest of Vologda (the district's administrative centre) by road. Prokhorovo is the nearest rural locality.
