= Pestovo, Tregubovsky Selsoviet, Velikoustyugsky District, Vologda Oblast =

Pestovo Пестово
- Village
- Location within Vologda Oblast Location within Russia
- Coordinates: 60°43′N 46°17′E
- Country: Russia
- Region: Vologda Oblast
- District: Velikoustyugsky District
- Time zone: UTC+3:00

Pestovo (Russian: Пестово) is a rural locality (a village) in Tregubovskoye Rural Settlement, Velikoustyugsky District, Vologda Oblast, Russia. The population was 37 as of 2002.

== Geography ==
The distance to Veliky Ustyug is 14.7 km, to Morozovitsa is 8.9 km. Morozovitsa is the nearest rural locality.
