= Pirogovo, Kadnikovsky Selsoviet, Sokolsky District, Vologda Oblast =

Pirogovo Пирогово
- Village
- Location within Vologda Oblast Location within Russia
- Coordinates: 59°38′N 40°48′E
- Country: Russia
- Region: Vologda Oblast
- District: Sokolsky District
- Time zone: UTC+3:00

Pirogovo (Russian: Пирогово) is a rural locality (a village) in Kadnikov, Sokolsky District, Vologda Oblast, Russia. The population was 4 as of 2002.

== Geography ==
Pirogovo is located 61 km northeast of Sokol (the district's administrative centre) by road. Korino is the nearest rural locality.
