= Pirogovo, Lukhsky District, Ivanovo Oblast =

Pirogovo Пирогово
- Village
- Location within Ivanovo Oblast Location within Russia
- Coordinates: 57°01′N 42°05′E
- Country: Russia
- Region: Ivanovo Oblast
- District: Lukhsky District
- Time zone: UTC+3:00

Pirogovo (Russian: Пирогово) is a rural locality (a village) in Lukhsky District, Ivanovo Oblast, Russia. Population: 10 (2010 census);

== Geography ==
This rural locality is located 10 kilometres (6.2 mi) from Lukh (the district's administrative centre), 69 kilometres (43 mi) from Ivanovo (capital of Ivanovo Oblast) and 306 kilometres (190 mi) from Moscow. Onoshkovo is the nearest rural locality.
