= Pirogovo, Vladimir Oblast =

Pirogovo Пирогово
- Village
- Location within Vladimir Oblast Location within Russia
- Coordinates: 56°13′N 40°59′E
- Country: Russia
- Region: Vladimir Oblast
- District: Kameshkovsky District
- Time zone: UTC+3:00

Pirogovo (Russian: Пирогово) is a rural locality (a village) in Penkinskoye Rural Settlement, Kameshkovsky District, Vladimir Oblast, Russia. The population was 16 as of 2010.

== Geography ==
Pirogovo is located 36 km south of Kameshkovo (the district's administrative centre) by road. Lubenkino is the nearest rural locality.
