= Vodafone Ukraine =

Ukrainian telecommunications company

PJSC VF Ukraine

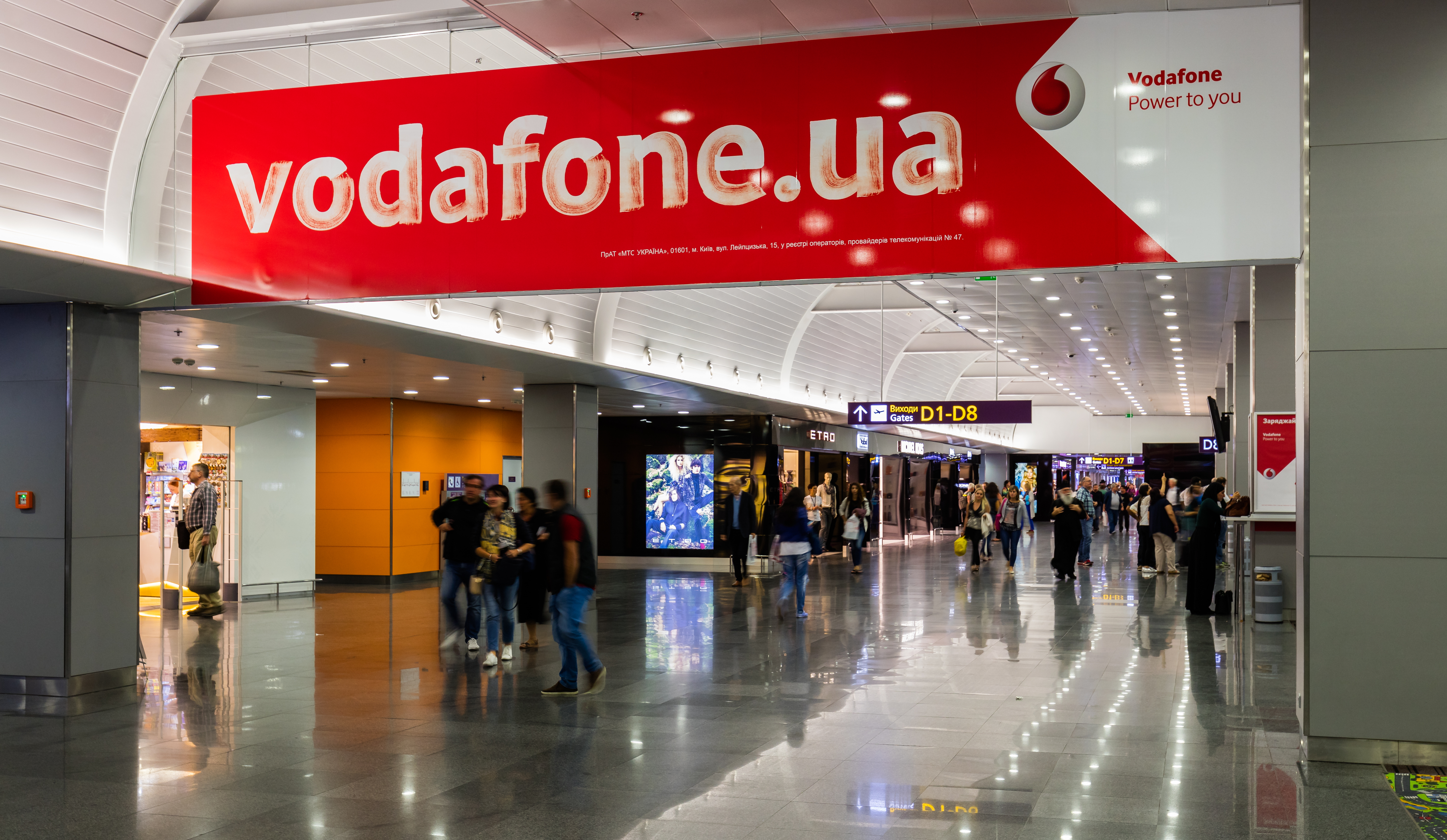
- Vodafone sign in Boryspil International Airport, Kyiv, Ukraine
- Formerly: CJSC Ukrainian Mobile Communications (1992–2003); PJSC MTS Ukraine (2003–2015)
- Type: Subsidiary
- Industry: Telecommunications
- Founded: 1992; 34 years ago
- Founder: Ukrtelekom; KPN; TDC A/S; Deutsche Telekom
- Headquarters: Kyiv, Ukraine
- Area served: Ukraine
- Key people: Olga Ustinova (CEO) Vasyl Latsanych (Chairman) Yusif Jabbarov (Deputy Chairman)
- Services: Telecommunications; Internet; IPTV
- Revenue: 18,142,000,000 hryvnia (2020)
- Operating income: 5,027,000,000 hryvnia (2020)
- Net income: 1,201,000,000 hryvnia (2020)
- Total assets: 37,790,000,000 hryvnia (2020)
- Owner: Bakcell (100%)
- Number of employees: 4,000 (2020)
- Parent: NEQSOL Holding
- Website: www.vodafone.ua

Vodafone Ukraine (originally UMC Ukraine, and later MTS Ukraine) is the second-largest mobile operator in Ukraine with 23.1 million users and thus a 38 percent market share (in September 2014). In November 2009 it had 17.74 million GSM subscribers. The company is fully owned by NEQSOL Holding. In October 2015 Mobile TeleSystems (MTS) and Vodafone expanded their 2008 strategic partnership; this resulted in the rebranding of MTS Ukraine to Vodafone Ukraine.

The company's main competitors are Kyivstar and Lifecell.

Vodafone's network codes in Ukraine are +380 50, +380 66, +380 95, and +380 99 (postpay and prepaid users mixed within the codes). The new +380 75 code was allocated in 2024.

== History ==
The company Ukrainian Mobile Communications (UMC) introduced mobile services in Ukraine, Sotel initially using the analog NMT standard, then using GSM-900 and 1800. In 1993 UMC Ukraine was Ukraine's SIM SIM major SIM SIM cellular operator. On July 1, 1993 the first call in the company's network was made, by the first president of Ukraine Leonid Kravchuk, who called the ambassador of Ukraine to Germany Ivan Piskov.

In 2003 Mobile TeleSystems (MTS) bought the company. In October 2006, MTS Ukraine terminated its NMT service with plans to use the spectrum for the CDMA-450 rollout. From late 2006, MTS Ukraine has developed its 3G mobile network with the CDMA-450 1xEV-DO standard. As of 2016 the Ukrainian MTS network supports various value-added services based on GPRS / EGPRS / EDGE and SMS / WAP / MMS / USSD. MTS is the only BlackBerry service provider in Ukraine; it also provides Wi-Fi hotspots, mainly in large cities and at airports.

Corporate social responsibility is one of the major strategic priorities of MTS Ukraine activity.

On March 15, 2007, MTS Ukraine became the first telecommunication company in Ukraine to receive the Certificate of European Foundation for Quality Management (EFQM) "Perfection Recognition", which confirms the high standards of communication-operator work.

MTS Ukraine logo (2007—2015)

In 2008, and MTS Ukraine's owner MTS and Vodafone signed a strategic partnership.

In 2011 MTS Ukraine openly declared its interest in acquiring Utel, a subsidiary of Ukrtelecom, Ukraine's monopolist telephone company, after Ukrtelecom announced plans to divest its mobile business. Vasyl Latsanych was appointed as company general director this year.

In October 2015 MTS and Vodafone expanded their strategic partnership; this resulted in the rebranding of MTS Ukraine as Vodafone Ukraine.

On 11 and 12 January 2018, the company operations in Ukraine's separatist entities on the occupied territories of Luhansk Oblast (on 11 January) and Donetsk Oblast (on 12 January) were discontinued after a fibre-optic line cut. This resulted in two million people losing mobile phone access. Until the Vodafone Ukraine line was repaired the remaining mobile phone carriers available in the region were the two operated by the separatist authorities. On 19 January the repair of the fibre optic line was completed and Vodafone Ukraine's services in territory controlled by the Luhansk People's Republic completely resumed. However, the territory controlled by the Donetsk People's Republic remained without a mobile connection; "the network does not work for reasons unknown to us" according to Vodafone Ukraine. On 23 March 2018, "Donetsk People's Republic" stated that Vodafone Ukraine could only resume operating in the territory controlled by it if it would start to pay taxes to the unrecognised state. Vodafone Ukraine refused.

In 2019 MTS sold its Ukraine operations to NEQSOL Holding, an Azerbaijani holding company founded in the 1990s and led by Chairman Yusif Jabbarov, who also serves as Deputy Chairman of Vodafone Ukraine.

== War in Ukraine ==
Since the beginning of the Russian invasion of Ukraine on February 24, 2022, Vodafone Ukraine has been committed to helping civilians victims of the security situation on the ground. The company has been providing free national roaming in order to allow soldiers as well as civilians to remain connected, even in damaged areas.
