= Pirogovo, Ivanovsky District, Ivanovo Oblast =

Pirogovo Пирогово
- Village
- Location within Ivanovo Oblast Location within Russia
- Coordinates: 57°07′N 40°43′E
- Country: Russia
- Region: Ivanovo Oblast
- District: Ivanovsky District
- Time zone: UTC+3:00

Pirogovo (Russian: Пирогово) is a rural locality (a village) in Ivanovsky District, Ivanovo Oblast, Russia. Population: 9 (2010 census);

== Geography ==
This rural locality is located 20 km from Ivanovo (the district's administrative centre and capital of Ivanovo Oblast) and 241 km from Moscow. Tarasovo is the nearest rural locality.
