= Pirogovsky =

Urban locality in Moscow Oblast, Russia

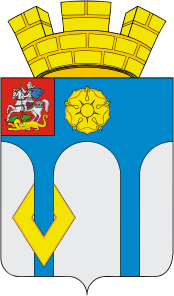
Coat of arms of Pirogovsky

Pirogovsky (Russian: Пироговский) was an urban locality (a work settlement) in Mytishchinsky District, Moscow Oblast, Russia. On 16 November 2015, it was merged into the city of Mytishchi. Population: 6,674 (2010 census); 6,260 (2002 census); 4,844 (1989 Soviet census).
