= Caucasus Online =

- Type: Limited liability company
- Industry: Telecommunications
- Founded: 2006
- Headquarters: Tbilisi, Georgia
- Key people: CEO George Shanidze
- Products: Internet, [ccTLD] Data Center
- Net income: ▲ (2014)
- Owner: NEQSOL Holding
- Number of employees: More than 100
- Website: www.co.ge

Caucasus Online (Georgian: კავკასუს ონლაინი) is one of the largest Georgian Internet service providers and controls a large part of the Georgian internet communications market. Caucasus Online was formed by the unification of several major Georgian ISPs: Caucasus Network, Georgia Online and SaNet. in 2006. In 2008 Telenet, the main provider of wireless and fiber-optic Internet in Georgia, merged with the Caucasus Online.

Since 2008, Caucasus Online has been the sole owner of a 1,200-kilometre (750 mi) submarine fiber-optic cable constructed by Tyco Electronics (today known as TE Subcom), through which it transits Internet traffic from Europe to the south Caucasus and Caspian region. The FOC was laid on the bottom of the Black Sea to provide a direct, high-quality fiber-optic Internet connection from Europe to the Caucasus region and Middle East. In September 2016, Caucasus Online sold its retail business to Magticom, and now Caucasus Online is a major wholesale operator in the region.

In 2019, Azerbaijan's Neqsol Holding acquired 49% of the Caucasus Online for $61 million. Neqsol acquired the remainder on 24 March 2021.
