= Bakcell =

Telecommunications company in Azerbaijan

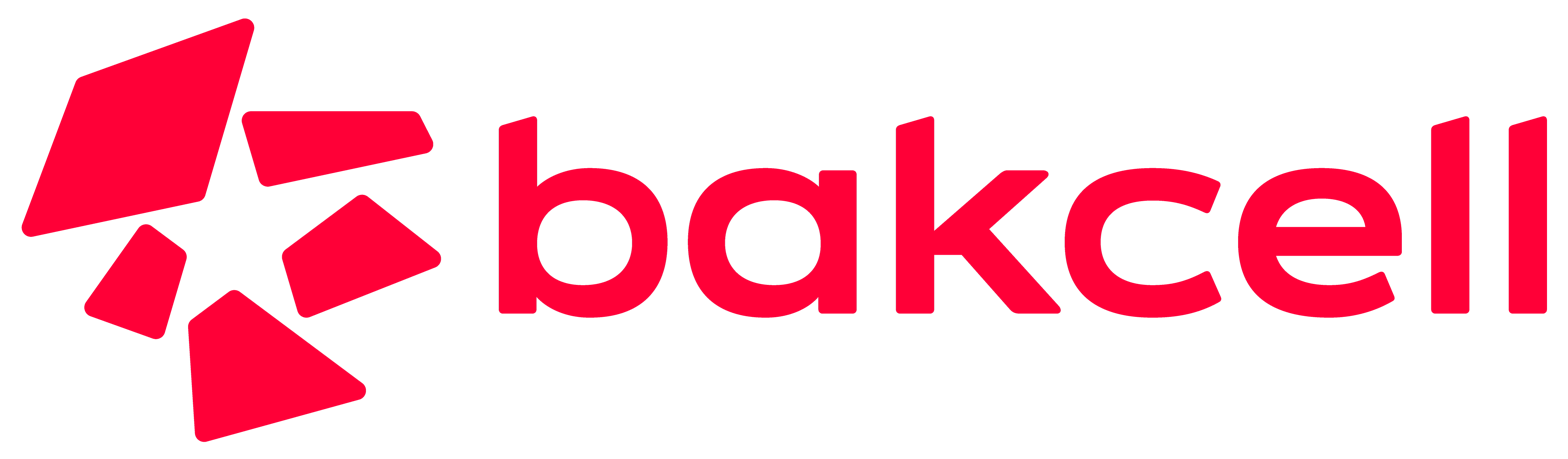
- Industry: Telecommunications
- Founded: 4 March 1994
- Area served: Azerbaijan
- Key people: Klaus Mueller (CEO) Vasyl Latsanych (Chairman) Yusif Jabbarov (Deputy Chairman)
- Services: Telecommunications; Internet service provider
- Website: bakcell.com

Bakcell is a telecommunications company in Azerbaijan.

With nearly 9,000 base stations, it covers 99.9% of Azerbaijan's population and 92.6% of the country's territory. Bakcell provides telecommunications services to over 3 million subscribers.

The fastest mobile internet in Azerbaijan is provided by Bakcell. It was awarded the title of "Azerbaijan's Fastest Mobile Network" by Ookla from 2018 to 2024.

The company is part of NEQSOL Holding, a diversified group of companies operating across various industries and countries. The group's main areas of activity include oil and gas, telecommunications, high technologies, and construction. The operations and services of its companies extend to countries such as the United Kingdom, the United States, Turkey, Azerbaijan, Ukraine, Georgia, Kazakhstan, and the United Arab Emirates.

== See also ==
- Ministry of Communications and Information Technologies (Azerbaijan)
