= NEQSOL Holding =

International group of companies

NEQSOL
- NEQSOL Holding
- Founder: Nasib Hasanov
- Type: Energy, Telecommunications, Construction, Mining
- Headquarters: Baku, Azerbaijan
- Chairman: Yusif Jabbarov
- CEO: Kirill Rubinski
- Subsidiaries: Vodafone Ukraine, Nobel Energy, Bakcell, UMCC
- Website: www.neqsolholding.com

NEQSOL Holding is an international group of companies active in energy, telecommunications, construction, and high-tech. It was founded in the early 1990s by Azerbaijani Nasib Hasanov. Initially focused on the oil and gas sector, the holding has expanded into other areas and now includes entities such as Vodafone Ukraine, Bakcell, Caucasus Online, Nobel Oil Group, Nobel Upstream, and Norm Cement.

The chairman is Yusif Jabbarov, who was appointed in July 2024, having been CEO since 2018. In 2023 Jabbarov was awarded the Taraggi Medal (Progress Medal), the state award of Azerbaijan, for his contributions to Azerbaijan's economic development and entrepreneurial sphere both personally and through NEQSOL Holding.

On 1 May, 2026 the company announced the appointment of Kirill Rubinski, an international investment banker and technology investor, as NEQSOL Holding's new CEO. According to the company, Rubinski was tasked to focus as CEO on four priorities: tighter integration across the group's business units, accelerated digital transformation, strengthened governance frameworks, and unlocking new opportunities in international markets.

== Industries ==
=== Oil and gas ===
NEQSOL Holding's oil and gas activity is concentrated within two companies registered in the UK: Nobel Oil E&P (known as Nobel Upstream) and Nobel Oil Services (now Nobel Energy).

The latter decided to change its name to Nobel Energy in the framework of a rebranding in December 2021. The Nobel Oil Group is a corporate group operating primarily in Azerbaijan, in the US, and in the UK. The company provides integrated operating services in the oil and gas sector. This group was founded by Nasib Hasanov in 2005, and later became Nobel Upstream and Nobel Oil Services in 2014.

=== Construction ===
The company owns Norm Cement, a construction-based company launched in 2006. Norm is the largest cement producer in the South Caucasus region.

=== Telecommunications ===
Bakcell

NEQSOL Holding acquired Bakcell in 2005. The company provides telecommunication (voice and mobile internet) services. It had around 2 million customers in 2010.

==== Vodafone Ukraine ====
Vodafone Ukraine (originally UMC Ukraine, and later MTS Ukraine) is one of the holding's main subsidiaries. It is the second-largest mobile operator in Ukraine with around 20 million users. In October 2015 Mobile TeleSystems (MTS) and Vodafone expanded their 2008 strategic partnership; this resulted in the rebranding of MTS Ukraine to Vodafone Ukraine. In 2019, NEQSOL Holding acquired 100% of Vodafone Ukraine.

This acquisition of Vodafone Ukraine was made through Backcell. It was previously owned by MTS belonging to Vladimir Yevtushenkov. Vodafone Ukraine keeps working under the British Vodafone brand.

In September 2021, NEQSOL appointed Vasyl Latsanych as its Head of Telecom Department and in 2023 as chairman of Vodafone Ukraine Board.

Since the beginning of the Russian invasion of Ukraine in February 2022, Vodafone Ukraine experienced a decrease in the net value of assets and significant costs related to the war.

Vodafone Ukraine declared that rebuilding all the telecommunications infrastructures damaged during the war will cost more than 50 million dollars to the company (as of May 2022), and a decrease in the number of its clients.

==== Caucasus Online ====
In 2019, Nasib Hasanov purchased 49% of the Caucasus Online. In 2021, NEQSOL Holding purchased the remaining 51% of the Caucasus Online from former owner Khvicha Makatsaria. The Georgian National Communication Commission (GNCC) tried to oppose the transaction, but the arbitration tribunal dismissed the Georgian authorities’ request and allowed the acquisition by NEQSOL Holding.

Caucasus Online was established in 2006 through the merging of three main Internet Service Providers (ISP): Caucasus Network, Georgia Online and Sanet. Telenet merged with the Caucasus Online in 2008. Caucasus Online owns 1.200 km of fiber cable across the Black Sea (the Caucasus Cable System).

==== United Mining and Chemical Company (UMCC) ====
In 2024, NEQSOL Holding, through its Ukrainian subsidiary Cemin Ukraine LLC, acquired United Mining and Chemical Company (UMCC) for approximately ₴3.94 billion (about US$96 million) in a government-run privatization auction. UMCC is Ukraine’s largest titanium-ore producer, operating the Vilnohirsk Mining and Metallurgical Plant in Dnipropetrovsk Oblast and the Irshansk Mining and Processing Plant in Zhytomyr Oblast. The acquisition occurred under the leadership of Yusif Jabbarov, who became Chairman of NEQSOL Holding in 2024, and reflected the company’s strategy of expanding beyond energy and telecommunications into the mining industry.

== Digital Silk Way ==
The Digital Silk Way is a project aiming at connecting Europe and Asia through a telecommunications corridor. It was initiated in 2018 and is being implemented by AzerTelecom, one of the holding's subsidiaries.

In 2020, the Digital Silk Way project was selected as one of Asia's top five infrastructure projects by the Global Strategic Infrastructure Leadership Forum held in the US.

The digital infrastructure project was presented at the Dubai Expo organized in the UAE in 2022 at the Azerbaijan Pavillon.

In 2023, in the framework of the Digital Silk Way project, AzerTelecom and Kazakhtelecom signed an agreement to link both sides of the Caspian Sea through a subsea cable from Azerbaijan to Kazakhstan.

== Humanitarian commitments ==
=== COVID-19 crisis in 2020 ===
NEQSOL Holding has donated 1 million dollars in 2020 to fight against the spread of COVID-19 pandemic in Ukraine. The funds allocated were used to purchase medical equipment and systems needed by hospitals.

=== War in Donbas in 2020 ===
In 2020, Vodafone Ukraine and the UNHCR provided free access to mobile communications to the most vulnerable populations in Eastern Ukraine: provided a connection to 2,489 conflict-affected persons.

=== War in Ukraine in 2022 ===
Together with 2 other mobile operators (Kyivstar of Veon and Lifecell of Turkcell), Vodafone Ukraine provided for free national roaming. In addition, Vodafone Ukraine kept soldiers and civilians connected despite damages on the telecommunications infrastructures.

At the beginning of the war, NEQSOL Holding and subsidiaries Norm and Bakcell participated in the help for repatriating Azerbaijani citizens from Ukraine. They provided Azerbaijani citizens free flights from Ukraine, and helped to organize train evacuation.

=== Turkey-Syria Earthquake in 2023 ===
Bakcell, one of NEQSOL Holding's subsidiaries, has sent equipment to Turkish civilians after the earthquake to help them stay in contact with their families despite the destruction caused by the natural catastrophe. The help includes 13 special installations (cost of 500.000 manats) dedicated to the most damaged areas.

Azerconnect, one of NEQSOL Holding's subsidiaries, has donated 5 million Turkish Liras to the Agency for Natural Disasters and Emergency Situations (AFAD) of the Ministry of Internal Affairs of Turkey to support civilians, and victims of the earthquake in Turkey.
