= Theater on Podil =

- Театр на Подолі
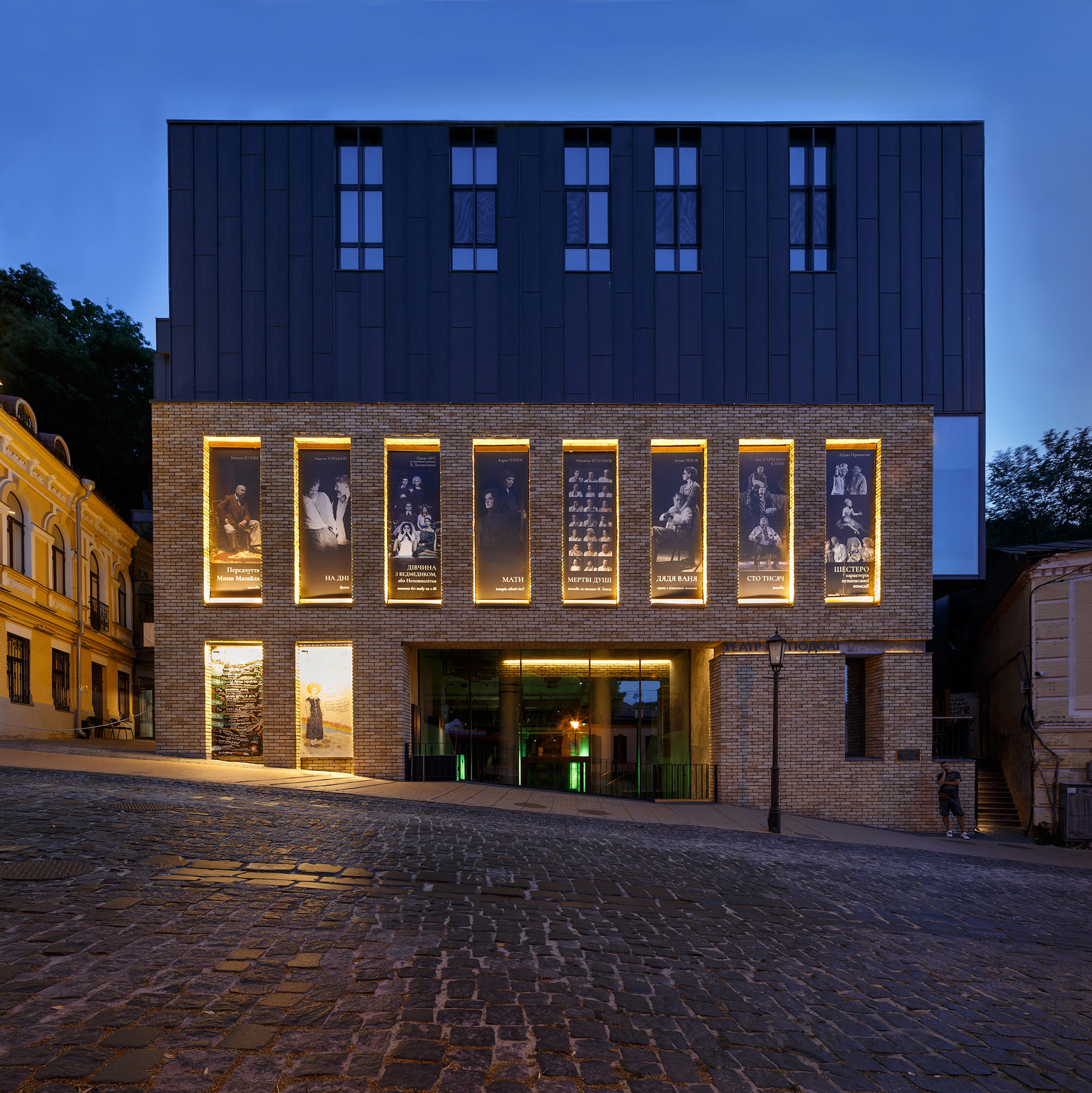
- Interactive map of Theater on Podil
- Location: Kyiv, Ukraine
- Coordinates: 50.46028°N 30.514412°E

Website
- Official website

Theater on Podil (officially: Kyiv Academic Drama Theater on Podil) is an academic drama theater in Kyiv, established in 1987 in historical Podil and directed by Ukrainian theater director Vitaliy Malakhov.

== History ==
In 1987, a theater was established in the Podil area of Kyiv. In 2006, it was granted the title of "Academic Drama Theater".

In 2017, the theater underwent a complete renovation and was reopened. However, the modernist architecture of the newly reconstructed building stirred much discussion and criticism. Many citizens expressed their dissatisfaction with the modern design, particularly because the theater is situated in the historical part of Kyiv. These sentiments led to outrage and protests.

Simultaneously, there were also many supporters of the new theater building who believed that the Podil area needed modern architecture. They questioned why the residents of Kyiv were resistant to accepting contemporary art.

In 2018, the reconstruction project of the Podil Theater received the Grand Prix at the Ukrainian Urban Awards architectural competition and won first prize in the Architecture of Cultural and Social Objects category.

In 2019, the restored building of the Theater in Podil was nominated for the European Architectural Award Mies van der Rohe Award 2019.
