= IPRA Golden World Awards =

Public relations awards

Golden World Awards for Excellence in PR
- Description: Annual global awards ceremony recognizing outstanding public relations achievements worldwide
- Country: International
- Presented by: International Public Relations Association

The Golden World Awards for Excellence in PR is an annual global awards ceremony organised by the International Public Relations Association to recognise public relations achievements around the world . Established in 1990, the Golden World Awards (the "Oscars of PR") has 49 categories of In-house and Agency entries judged separately, and honours the overall highest standards of each year with the IPRA Grand Prix for Excellence. There is also a special Global Contribution Award for an entry meeting one of the UN's 17 Sustainable Development Goals.

== Entry criteria ==
In Round 1 the jury considers programme summaries. There is an overall limit of 1800 words, and separate limits for each of the 6 Criteria. Entries must be in English.

All entries are submitted online to the IPRA secretariat and must include a short Overview of the programme. Under separate headlines, each entry then addresses five Criteria:

1. Statement of Problem/Opportunity
2. Research
3. Planning
4. Execution
5. Outcomes

Finalists from Round 1 are then invited to upload supporting media to assist the judges in the selection of category winners.

== Award categories ==
=== PR disciplines ===
1. Artificial Intelligence for content AICONTENT - For the use of AI in the content of a PR campaign.
2. Artificial Intelligence for crisis management AICRISIS - For excellence in deploying AI tools to respond to a crisis in real time.
3. Artificial Intelligence for measurement AIMEASURE - For innovative use of AI data analytics to measure effectiveness.
4. Climate change and literacy CLIMATE - For a PR campaign on climate change issues or education.
5. Community relations COMREL - For a PR campaign that helped engage a community in some specific way.
6. Corporate communications CORPCOM - For excellence in enhancing a company’s reputation through communications.
7. Corporate responsibility CORPRES - For a PR campaign demonstrating excellence in corporate social responsibility.
8. Crisis and issues management CRISIS - For excellent communications management during a crisis or similar issue.
9. Digital and social media creativity DIGITAL - For a purely digital PR campaign showing creativity in its use of social media.
10. Environmental ENV - For a PR campaign on an environmental or ecological issue.
11. Environmental, social, and governance ESG - For a campaign using an ESG framework to understand sustainability.
12. Influencer relations INFLUENCE - For a PR campaign where the result was largely determined by social media influencers.
13. Integration of traditional and new media INTEG - For the creative integration of traditional and social media in a PR campaign.
14. Internal communications INTERNAL - For a creative internal communications campaign that engaged personnel.
15. International campaign INTL - For a coordinated PR campaign in more than one country.
16. Media relations MEDIA - For a PR campaign which showed impressive media reach.
17. Podcasts and video POD - For a PR campaign that primarily used podcasts or short video.
18. PR on a low budget PRLOW - For a creative PR campaign on a low budget.
19. Public affairs PUBLICAF - For lobbying that influenced or changed public policy.
20. Reputation and brand management REPUTE - For the creative positioning of a company image or brand.
21. Sustainability communications SUST - For a PR campaign promoting sustainability.

=== PR sectors ===
1. Agriculture AGRI - For a PR campaign in the agricultural or farming sector.
2. Arts and entertainment ARTS - For a PR campaign in arts or entertainment.
3. Business-to-business B2B - For a business-to-business PR campaign.
4. Construction CONSTRUCT - For a PR campaign about construction, real estate or architecture.
5. Consumer product launch CONSUMPRODL - For creative PR activities around the launch of a consumer product.
6. Consumer product PR CONSUMPRODX - For creative PR activities around an existing consumer product.
7. Consumer service launch CONSUMSERVL - For creative PR activities around the launch of a consumer service.
8. Consumer service PR CONSUMSERVX - For creative PR activities around an existing consumer service.
9. Country, region and city COUNTRY - For a PR campaign to promote a country, a region or a city.
10. Courage in communication COURAGE - For a PR campaign addressing political upheaval, conflict or natural disaster.
11. Energy and utilities ENERGY - For a PR campaign in the energy, oil, or utilities sector.
12. Event management and live communication EVENT - For the planning and delivery of a successful event with a PR dimension.
13. Fake news FAKE - For a PR campaign countering misinformation or disinformation.
14. Financial services and investor relations FINANCE - For use of PR for a financial product or service or in investor relations.
15. Food and beverage FOOD - For a PR campaign to promote a new or existing food or beverage.
16. Gaming and virtual reality GAME - For a PR campaign that launched a development in the gaming or VR industry.
17. Healthcare HEALTH - For a PR campaign in the pharmaceutical or healthcare industry.
18. Industrials INDUSTRY - For a PR campaign in materials, mining, chemicals, steel and other heavy industry.
19. NGO campaign NGO - For a PR campaign by a charity or non-governmental organisation.
20. Public sector PUBLICSEC - For creative use of PR by a public sector body.
21. Publications PUBLT - For a creative PR publication in print or electronic format.
22. Retail and fashion RETAIL - For a PR campaign in the retail or fashion sector.
23. Small and medium enterprises SME - For a PR campaign by an SME (as defined by the EU).
24. Sponsorship SPONSOR - For a PR campaign that promoted awareness of sponsorship of an event or activity.
25. Sport SPORT - For a PR campaign to promote sport or exercise for itself or to a community.
26. Technology TECH - For a creative PR campaign in the technology or IT sector.
27. Transport TRANSPORT - For a PR campaign in the automotive or other transport sector.
28. Travel and tourism TRAVEL - For a PR campaign in the travel, hotel or tourism sector.

== Grand Prix for Excellence Winners ==
- 2026 - AI for Crisis Communication: From Study to Strategy, Nigeria, Image Merchants
- 2025 - Data is a Value - Protect It, Latvia, Olsen+Partners
- 2024 - Pots that Develop, Peru, Alicorp
- 2023 - Call Russia, Lithuania, Not Perfect Vilnius
- 2022 - Tencent Weixin Pay, China, One for All Love Meal Program
- 2021 - Te Taura Whiri i te Reo Māori, New Zealand, Te Wā Tuku Reo Māori - The Māori Language Moment
- 2020 - LLYC, Spain, The last older person to die in loneliness
- 2019 - Dentsu Public Relations Inc, Japan, Kobayashi City Department of SimCity BuildIt
- 2018 - FleishmanHillardVanguard and Orta, Russia, Aeroflot's Sulimov dogs
- 2017 - Weber Shandwick, UK, The alphabet of illiteracy
- 2016 - FleishmanHillard / Royal Philips, Ireland, Philips breathless choir
- 2015 - Atmosphere Communications, South Africa, Sanlam one rand man
- 2014 - Nanyang Technological University, Singapore, a global university on the rise
- 2013 - Turkcell, Turkey, Women Empowerment in Economy
- 2012 - Blumen Group, Serbia
- 2011 - Absa, South Africa, Absa rings the bell
